= Bob Lido =

American musician

Robert Lido
- Welk show singer and violinist Bob Lido

Background information
- Born: September 21, 1914
- Died: August 9, 2000 (aged 85)
- Occupation(s): Musician and singer
- Instrument: Violin

Robert Lido (September 21, 1914 – August 9, 2000) was an American musician and singer who was a regular member of television's The Lawrence Welk Show. His instrument was the violin.

== Life and career ==
Born in Jersey City, New Jersey, he began playing the violin as a child and later took vocal lessons. His talents led him to stints as a featured performer with Carmen Cavallaro's band and later with Perry Como's supper club. He joined Welk in 1952 and until the maestro's retirement in 1982, Bob was their featured violinist, and an accomplished vocalist both with tender ballads, jazz favorites and also country music. He was one of the show's comics as well, featured in many humorous novelty songs with fellow Welk stars such as Aladdin, Larry Hooper and Charlie Parlato.

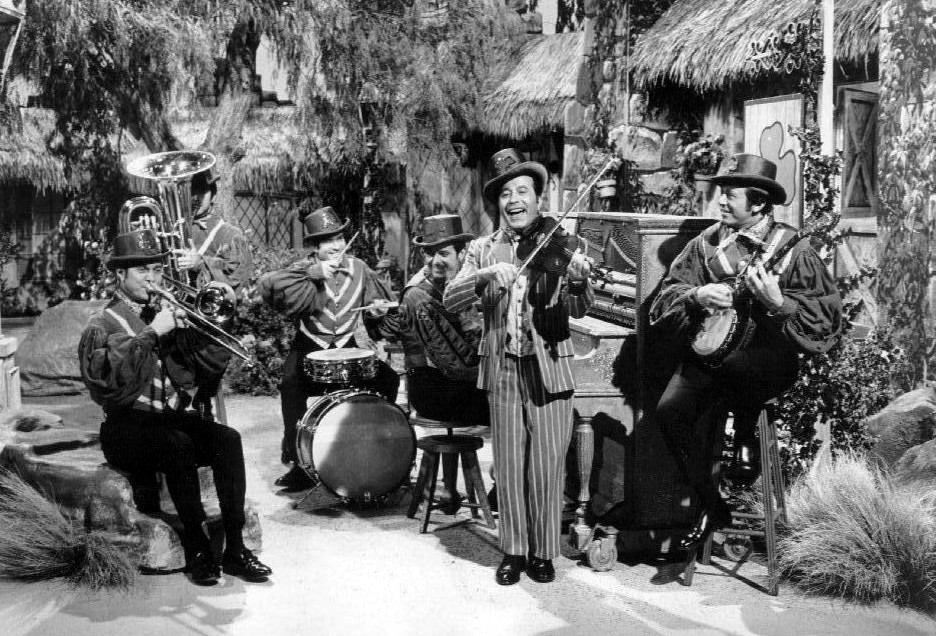
Lido and the Hotsy Totsy Boys on the Welk St. Patrick's Day show in 1970.

He also led a revival of the Hotsy Totsy Boys, one of Lawrence's early bands, which were popular features on the show during the early 1970s. They featured Lido as lead vocalist and fiddler, Parlato on trumpet, Russ Klein on saxophone, Richard Maloof on tuba, Bob Havens on trombone, Neil LeVang on ukulele and banjo, Bob Ralston on piano and Jack Imel playing the drums and spoons.

== Death ==
Lido died in 2000 in San Diego, California from complications of a stroke.
