= Big Tiny Little =

American jazz musician

- Born: Dudley Little, Jr. August 31, 1930; Worthington, Minnesota, United States
- Died: March 3, 2010 (aged 79) Carson City, Nevada, United States
- Genres: Honky-tonk, ragtime
- Occupation: Musician
- Instrument: Piano
- Labels: Brunswick; Coral
- Formerly of: The Lawrence Welk Show band

Dudley "Big Tiny" Little, Jr. (August 31, 1930 – March 3, 2010) was an American musician who appeared on The Lawrence Welk Show from 1955 to 1959. His primary instrument was the piano.

== Biography ==
Born in Worthington, Minnesota, United States, and the son of Tiny Little, Sr., a prominent musician and bandleader, Big Tiny Little, Jr., first took up playing piano at the age of five, becoming both a honky-tonk, ragtime pianist and playing other instruments such as the organ, bass horn and bass fiddle. After playing in his father's band for a while, he joined the United States Air Force and did a tour in the Far East. He became a member of Lawrence Welk's famous "champagne music makers" just one month after Welk's national TV debut in 1955. A regular feature of Welk's popular show, Tiny's outstanding keyboard artistry won him millions of fans from coast to coast. He was featured in solo performances of old Tin Pan Alley tunes, but he also worked quietly as a member of the Welk ensemble, at the rear of the bandstand, playing background piano alongside singer-pianist Larry Hooper.

After his tenure on the show (he was replaced by Jo Ann Castle), Little went solo again; recording more than 45 albums and making guest appearances on several television programs over the years. More recently, he played with Mary Lou Metzger, Jack Imel, Ralna English, Ava Barber and Dick Dale in the touring Live Lawrence Welk Show. Little also performed at President Ronald Reagan's inaugural balls in 1985 and returned to television in the PBS special; Lawrence Welk: Milestones and Memories, which featured a reunion of stars from the Welk show.

The Dinah Shore Chevy Show of January 20, 1963, was devoted entirely to masters of the piano, featuring Dinah Shore's four guests, Liberace, Peter Nero, Ray Charles and Big Tiny Little.

He lived in Carson City, Nevada, and died there on March 3, 2010, aged 79.

== Discography ==
- Make Room for Tiny (Brunswick Records BL-54030) (1957)
- Honky Tonk Piano (Brunswick Records BL-54049) (1959)
- Big Tiny Little's Music of the 20s (Brunswick Records BL-757057) (1959)
- Big Tiny's Little Black Book (Coral Records CRL 757356) (1960)
- "Big" Tiny Little's Singing Honky-Tonk (Coral Records CRL 757335) (1960)
- Big Tiny Little In Person (Coral Records CRL 757390) (1961)
- Christmas With Big Tiny Little (Coral Records CRL 757391) (1961; reissued by MCA Records in 1995 as Ragtime Christmas)
- Little Land (Coral Records-CRL-757386) (1961)
- Big Tiny Little Movin' On (Coral Records CRL 57425) (1963)
- Tiny Little's Forties (Coral Records CRL 757445) (1964)
- Mr. Piano Personality (Coral Records CRL57461) (1964)
- Honky Tonk Hootenanny (Coral Records-CRL-57448) (1964)
- Play Me A Country Song (Coral Records-CRL-757481) (1965)
- Golden Piano Hits (GNP Crescendo Records GNPD 2113) (1978)
- Honky Tonk Piano (with Mickey Finn) (GNP Crescendo GNPD 2127) (1979)
- Music of the 30s" (Coral Records, CRL 57366)

== In popular culture ==
"Big Tiny" Little's Brunswick recording of "Twelfth Street Rag", from the album Honky Tonk Piano (Side 1, track 4), was the theme for Joe Franklin's long-running TV show on New York City station WOR-TV (now WWOR-TV). Little's version served as the opening and closing theme until the mid-1990s.
