= Jim Turner (singer) =

American singer-songwriter (born 1946)

- Born: James Louis Turner; September 6, 1946 (age 79); Knoxville, Tennessee, U.S.
- Genres: Traditional pop; country; Christian; blues; folk
- Occupations: Singer-songwriter
- Instruments: Vocals
- Years active: 1979-present

James Louis Turner (born September 6, 1946) is an American singer-songwriter, who has national credits from Broadway, television, and radio. Well-known from The Lawrence Welk Show as the country/pop bass baritone from 1979 until its eponymous host retired in 1982, he was earlier cast on Broadway for the original Jesus Christ Superstar, while he was in New York City on a Nashville folk rock tour. He was nominated in 2008 for a Dove Award as a country and gospel singer for his first radio release in the Christian music genre. He is the founder of The Sounds of Purpose and remains on the board of directors of this music-charged charity.

== Life and career ==
Born and reared in Knoxville, Tennessee, Turner got his early experience in a local band performing on the southeastern college concert and club circuit. He toured Europe as a youth soloist and classical guitarist for the University of Tennessee choir.

After graduating with honors, majoring in Engineering Management and working summers in Music, he moved to the capital city of Nashville and launched a career in the lounges of country music, "jamming" with Doug Kershaw, Johnny Cash, and Kris Kristofferson. He found immediate success as a songwriter, session musician and recording artist. Booked on a trip to New York performing with a variety show, Turner auditioned on Broadway for Jesus Christ Superstar, singing the only ballad from Pilate (not with the rehearsal pianist, but his classically played acoustic guitar).

Turner was the only lead role cast at that time. He went on to play the bass part of Caiphas, plus the screaming tenor of Pilate. After the Los Angeles run of Superstar, Turner decided to stay on the West Coast but returned to his country music roots while adding folk and rock to his acoustic guitar and vocals. He was entertaining on the Los Angeles club circuit (the Palomino, the Pasadena Ice House, the Troubadour), plus colleges, fairs and clubs throughout the country. Turner was signed to the GRC record label, and was produced by both Neil Wilburn and Larry Cox.

In 1979, he was discovered at a "gig" by Welk reedman, Russ Klein, who suggested he audition for his boss, Lawrence Welk. Turner sang the Broadway ballad, "My Cup Runneth Over", with a classical arrangement he had worked out on his guitar while still in college. Turner became the show's featured country/pop singer for its final three years on syndicated television. Episodes in which he appeared are sometimes seen in weekly reruns in most states on PBS. On the show, and on its concert tours, he also performed duets with Ava Barber and sang with The Aldridge Sisters and with Gail Farrell in addition to his solo numbers.

During the 1982 World's Fair, Turner starred in the Broadway pre-run of Drumwright, a project of two-time Tony Award winner, John Cullum. This original musical was booked for the next season at the Performing Arts Center. Instead of playing a "character" again, Turner returned to Los Angeles to sing, where he went on to headline in his own shows at Knott's Berry Farm, the former Opryland USA, plus long-term commitments on the General Jackson Showboat and at the Louise Mandrell Sunday Morning Show in the Grand Ole Opry.

He was next cast as "Jud" in Oklahoma in Nashville. He also completed several tours all across the United States, on cruise ships, and in symphonic concerts, plus more recently, his Christian country concerts.

Turner is also an ordained minister from the Church of Jesus of Nazareth, a non-denominational church in nearby Madison, Tennessee. He also obtained his doctorate in Contemporary Music from Oxford, England in 1993 upon submission of his body of work and thesis. His Master's work was accomplished at the Dick Grove School of Music in Hollywood, with a Major in Harmony.

He is married to the former Terri Lynn Fraser. When he first met her in 1980, she was an audio engineer at ABC. They live near Nashville. He permits his label, High Anchor Records, to be used by new talent.

Turner continues releasing songs to radio in five genres. His album, Sunday Best, was released in 2012. Turner's first radio song released on FrostByte Records received a Dove Award nomination for best singer.
