= Tanya Falan Welk-Roberts =

American singer (born 1948)

Tanya Falan Welk (born May 4, 1948) is an American singer who appeared on The Lawrence Welk Show from 1968 to 1977.

Born and raised in Glendale, California, Tanya began singing at age four at her uncle's Los Angeles restaurant. As a teenager, she worked at Disneyland where she had her own band known as Tanya and the Thunderbirds. While in high school, she developed her skills with other instruments such as the drums, cello, bass and xylophone in addition to singing.

Tanya made her Welk show debut on New Year's Eve 1967, and shortly afterwards was made a regular member of the cast. A few months later in the summer of 1968, she also became a member of Lawrence Welk's own family when she married his son Larry, Jr. The couple had two sons, Lawrence Welk, III (born 1970) and Kevin (born 1971).

During her tenure on the show, she sang solo numbers and in many group numbers, pairing with Anacani as a duo and often as a trio with fellow Italian-American music makers Bob Lido and Charlie Parlato.

Tanya also branched out in other areas of television, making guest appearances on Jerry Lewis' Labor Day Telethon and in 1971, guest starred on the soap opera General Hospital.

In 1969, she recorded the album Let It Be Me which was released by Ranwood Records.

She left the show in 1977, and two years later (1979) her marriage to Larry Welk ended. In 1980 she married former world champion motorcycle racer and racing team owner, Kenny Roberts.
