= Natalie Nevins =

American singer (1925 - 2010)

- Born: May 15, 1925; Philadelphia, Pennsylvania, United States
- Died: August 23, 2010 (aged 85); Langhorne, Pennsylvania, United States
- Genres: Inspirational
- Occupation: Singer
- Instrument(s): Vocals, Flute
- Years active: 1950–1969
- Labels: Ranwood

Natalie Nevins (May 15, 1925 – August 23, 2010) was an American singer who appeared on television's The Lawrence Welk Show from 1965 to 1969.

== Early life ==
Born and raised in Philadelphia, Pennsylvania, Nevins began singing when she was five and later took flute and piano lessons. She graduated from Little Flower Catholic High School for Girls in Hunting Park and later attended Chestnut Hill College and the University of Pennsylvania.

== Singing career ==
In 1950, she had her own television program on WCAU titled Notes From Natalie. Two years later, she was asked by Ed Sullivan to appear on his show after meeting him at a benefit in Philadelphia.

In 1965, she was hired by Lawrence Welk as a vocalist on his weekly television program, where her pitch perfect singing voice earned Natalie nationwide fans and admirers. Nevins was hired after she sang to him over the phone after the suggestion of her doctor, of which Welk was among the patients. In addition to solo numbers, she sang in duets with Jimmy Roberts and Joe Feeney and recorded a solo album titled Natalie Nevins Sings I Believe & Other Inspirational Songs which was released by Ranwood Records in 1968.

Nevins left the Lawrence Welk show in 1969 and was mostly out of the public spotlight after that.

Nevins briefly was an assistant on NBC's The Tonight Show Starring Johnny Carson and later moved back to Philadelphia to care for her mother and to be near her brother, Reverend John Nevins, a Roman Catholic priest.

== Death ==
Natalie Nevins died on August 23, 2010, from complications from hip surgery at St. Mary's Medical Center in Langhorne, Pennsylvania.
