= Anacani =

Mexican singer (born 1955)

- Born: "Anacani" María Consuelo Castillo-López y Cantor-Montoya; April 10, 1954 (age 72); Sinaloa, Mexico
- Occupation: Singer
- Years active: 1954–present

"Anacani" María Consuelo Castillo-López y Cantor-Montoya (born April 10, 1954) is a Mexican singer best known as a featured performer on The Lawrence Welk Show television program.

== Early life ==
She was born in Sinaloa, Mexico, as the sixth of seven children of Spanish and French parents. The family moved to the United States when she was a child. During that time she began to sing thanks to her family's musical background. In middle school, during a family trip to Mexico, her singing talents were discovered by a television producer, which led to appearances on the variety show Las Estrellas y Usted (The Stars and You) followed by appearances on Latin American television and concert tours.

== Career ==
After completing high school, Anacani and her family went to the Lawrence Welk Resort in Escondido, California, where she was discovered by bandleader Lawrence Welk. She became the resort's singing hostess and debuted on the Lawrence Welk Show in January 1973. After more guest appearances, she was hired as a regular performer.

During the show's run and afterward, she was popular as a soloist with songs like "Vaya Con Dios", "Luna", "Eres tu", and "It's Impossible". She did duets with Welk star Tanya Falan, toured with ensemble and released an album called Lawrence Welk presents Anacani through Ranwood Records. She served as the Latino spokesman for Yuban Coffee. She had a bit part in the 1981 feature film Zoot Suit.

== Personal life ==
Anacani lives in Escondido with her husband Rudy Echeverria and her daughter Priscila. She is an accomplished clothing designer and seamstress. She performs with other Welk alumnae. She is a guest soloist with many symphony orchestras; and since the early 1980s has worked the telethon for the West Texas Rehabilitation Center in Abilene, Texas.
