= Michael Redman (singer) =

American singer (born 1945)

Michael M. Redman (born April 15, 1945) is an American singer who was a member of television's The Lawrence Welk Show from 1980 to 1982 as part of the trio Gail, Ron and Michael, with Ron Anderson and Anderson's wife, Gail Farrell.

Redman was born in Portland, Oregon, and graduated from the University of Southern California with a degree in performing arts and literature. He did voice work for famous cartoons including The Flintstones and Yogi Bear. Later he appeared on television shows such as The Smothers Brothers Comedy Hour, Happy Days, Sonny and Cher and Donny and Marie. He also appeared as a singer on Johnny Mann's Stand Up and Cheer show. As a vocalist, he performed and recorded with Barbra Streisand, Frank Sinatra, Henry Mancini, Barry Manilow and the Ray Conniff Singers.

It was Tom Netherton who recommended Redman for Gail and Ron's trio on the Welk show in 1980. Today, Redman still performs with the trio. His recent projects include a new album titled Michael Redman — Yesterday and Today and vocal work for the 1991 Walt Disney Harmony.
