= Barbara Boylan =

American dancer and former television personality

Barbara Boylan (born August 12, 1941 (age 84) in Long Beach, California) is an American dancer and former television personality who was featured on The Lawrence Welk Show from 1961 to 1967, and briefly for a few months in 1979.

She was the first of Bobby Burgess's three dancing partners on the show. The two have known each other since childhood; both attended the same dance school where they were first paired together. Boylan and Burgess made their Welk debut in the spring of 1961 when they won the Calcutta dance contest at the Aragon Ballroom in Santa Monica sponsored by the Maestro. After six months of guest appearances, they were hired as regulars.

Boylan remained on the show until the summer of 1967, when she married Welk castmate Greg Dixon and retired from show business. (She briefly returned for a few months in 1978 after her replacement, Cissy King, left the show.) She and Dixon celebrated 50 years of marriage in 2017, and are the parents of two children, David and Dee Dee, and numerous grandchildren. They make their home in the suburbs of Denver, Colorado, where she ran a dance studio for 23 years.
