= Myron Floren =

American accordionist (1919–2005)

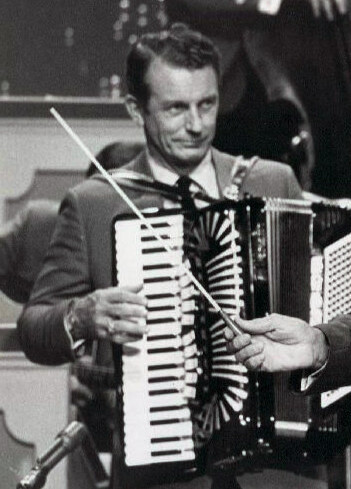
- Floren on The Lawrence Welk Show in 1969

Background information
- Born: November 5, 1919; Roslyn, South Dakota, U.S.
- Died: July 23, 2005 (aged 85) Rolling Hills Estates, California, U.S.
- Occupations: Accordionist, bandleader
- Formerly of: Buckeye Four, The Lawrence Welk Show, Myron Floren Orchestra

Myron Floren (November 5, 1919 – July 23, 2005) was an American musician best known as the accordionist on The Lawrence Welk Show between 1950 and 1982. Floren came to prominence primarily from his regular appearances on the weekly television series in which Lawrence Welk dubbed him as "the happy Norwegian," which was also attributed to Peter Friello.

Floren was highly regarded by Lawrence Welk, who was an accomplished accordion player in his own right. Floren functioned as Welk's principal assistant and second-in-command. In Floren's autobiography Accordion Man, written with his daughter Randee Floren, he recalled handling road manager duties when the band traveled, including hotel arrangements and other logistics. Prior to his death, he hosted some of the repeats of The Lawrence Welk Show on PBS.

== Early years ==
Floren was born to Norwegian immigrant parents Ole and Tillie Floren. A first-generation American of Norwegian immigrant parentage, he grew up on a farm near Roslyn in Day County, South Dakota with two brothers, Arlie and Duane (a.k.a. Dewey), and four sisters, Valborg, Genevieve, Virginia, and Gloria. Before Myron played the accordion he had piano lessons from Dorothy Swenson, his music teacher, who identified with Myron because she also had had rheumatic fever. He took up playing the accordion at the age of six when his father bought him a $10 mail-order squeezebox. He taught himself how to play the instrument. He often spent several hours a day using his own methods of study. Soon he was performing solo around the community, often at fairs and social events.

After suffering from rheumatic fever as a child, his accordion playing saved his life, as the exertion strengthened his heart back to pre-fever performance. At a 1980 performance at Norsk Høstfest in Minot, North Dakota, Floren mentioned that he had a heart valve replacement (from a pig's heart) two years earlier.

He worked his way through Augustana College in Sioux Falls, South Dakota, by working at radio station KSOO as "The Melody Man" and teaching accordion in the area. He tried to enlist in the Army when the United States entered World War II, but was turned down for active duty because of heart damage caused by the rheumatic fever he had suffered as a child.

However, he insisted on serving his country by joining the USO, performing in Europe from 1944-1945 with notable stars such as Lily Pons and Marlene Dietrich. After the war, he returned home to South Dakota, where he married Berdyne Koerner in 1945. The couple eventually had five daughters and gained three sons-in-law and seven grandchildren. Bobby Burgess from the Welk show was one of his sons-in-law.

== Years with Lawrence Welk ==
In 1950, Floren, who was performing with a music group known as "The Buckeye Four", went to a dance at the Casa Loma Ballroom in St. Louis, Missouri at which the Lawrence Welk Orchestra was then playing. When the maestro recognized the accordion virtuoso in the audience, he invited him to play a number with his band. The number turned out to be "Lady of Spain", and from the overwhelming positive response from the audience, Lawrence hired Myron to be a permanent member of his band. "Lady of Spain" also became Floren's trademark song and he played it countless times on the Welk show.

Although Floren's musical technique made him a much better accordion player than Welk, the two men developed a close working relationship, and Welk never hesitated to allow Floren to display his virtuosity; occasionally the two would even play duets.

Over the next thirty-two years, Floren became one of the most popular members of the band and the organization itself. It began with the band's migration to California, along with concert dates on the road, and exposure to television, first on local broadcasts from the Aragon Ballroom in Santa Monica, California and later on the ABC network in 1955. During the time The Lawrence Welk Show was on television, Floren was a featured solo performer and an assistant conductor. He also took over some of the maestro's announcing duties.

== Later years ==
In 1977, he released a disco music album titled Disco Polka. It featured congas, accordion, and synthesizer covers of such songs as "Clarinet Polka", "How High the Moon", "L'amour est bleu", "Beer Barrel Polka", and "I Want a Girl (Just Like the Girl That Married Dear Old Dad)".

After the show went off the air in the early 1980s, Floren continued to perform on the road, as many as 200 days a year, either as a solo artist, with his orchestra, or with other members of the Welk Show cast. He is also shown playing in the 1986 music video "Can't Cry Anymore" by American rock band Kansas.

Among the annual events which he headlined were the German Fest in Milwaukee, Wisconsin; the Norsk Høstfest in Minot, North Dakota; the Strawberry Festival in Plant City, Florida; the Wurstfest and his birthday in New Braunfels, Texas; and the PolkaFest at the Welk Resort in Branson, Missouri.

He died of cancer in California on July 23, 2005, at age 85.

== Recognition ==
Floren was among the first class of inductees into the Scandinavian-American Hall of Fame in 1984 and inducted into the International Polka Music Hall of Fame in 1990. In 1992 at a General Assembly in Trossingen, Germany, the Confédération internationale des accordéonistes awarded Myron Floren their Merit Award in recognition of his outstanding contributions to the international accordion movement. In July 1996, the American Accordionists' Association honored Floren for his achievements.

In 2022, the Myron Floren Archive and Accordion Collection was donated to the US National Music Museum.

== Selected compositions ==
- Skating Waltz in Swing
- Swingin' in Vienna
- Kavallo's Kapers
- Windy River
- Dakota Polka
- Long Long Ago in Swing
- Minute Waltz in Swing
- Accordion Man Polka
