= The Otwell Twins =

American musical duo

- Born: August 2, 1956 (age 69) Tulia, Texas
- Occupation: Singers
- Instrument: Guitar
- Members: Roger Otwell; David Otwell

The Otwell Twins are an American singing duo made up of twin brothers Roger and David, born August 2, 1956, in Tulia, Texas. They are best known as members of The Lawrence Welk Show from 1977 to 1982.

Singing and playing the guitar since their days in junior high and in high school, the brothers joined the Welk organization in October 1977, after attending Lubbock Christian College and West Texas State University teaming up with fellow sibling act The Aldridge Sisters as the popular quartet of The Aldridge Sisters and the Otwell Twins, which was popular with viewers for the remainder of the Welk show's run .

Since then, the Otwells have performed in concerts, churches, special events as well as for wraparound segments for Welk show reruns on public television. Today, the brothers reside in Amarillo with their families. They are engaged in the petroleum and water filtration businesses.
