= Kathie Sullivan =

American-born singer (born 1953)

- Born: May 31, 1953 (age 72); Oshkosh, Wisconsin, U.S.
- Genres: Gospel, standards
- Occupation: Singer
- Years active: 1976–present

Kathie Sullivan (born May 31, 1953) is an American-born singer who appeared on television's The Lawrence Welk Show from 1976 to 1982.

== Biography ==
=== Early years ===
Born in Oshkosh, Wisconsin, Sullivan began singing in church and later at George Nelson Tremper High School in Kenosha, Wisconsin where she sang in the choir and also played cello in the orchestra.

=== Musical career ===
She was discovered by Lawrence Welk while attending the University of Wisconsin–Madison, where she was the local Miss Champagne Lady in a show that went on the road. She was hired by Welk in 1976 just 9 credits short of finishing her Bachelor’s Degree, which she ultimately completed as an adult while raising her family. On the Welk Show she sang numerous solos, and often was paired with Dick Dale in various numbers.

As a Christian music artist, she released several Gospel music albums and has performed for charitable originations as World Vision. Kathie also performed in a one-woman show as Jane Long around her home in Dallas, Texas.

Today, she continues to perform, mostly at retirement communities for seniors, and has hosted wraparounds for Welk repeats aired on PBS.

=== Personal life ===
Once believed to be romantically involved with Andy Kaufman, with whom she appeared on a 1981 episode of Fridays (the incident was a hoax), she married her high school boyfriend Hugh Tollack in 1986 and is the mother of two daughters.
