= Oh Happy Day (1952 song) =

1952 surprise hit song

Single by Don Howard Koplow
- B-side: "You Went Away"
- Published: 1952
- Released: November 1952
- Recorded: 1952
- Genre: Traditional pop
- Label: Triple A
- Songwriters: Don Howard Koplow, Nancy Binns Reed

"Oh Happy Day" was a 1952 surprise hit song, one of the first whose initial popularity was driven by teenagers rather than support from the music industry.

The song was originally recorded and copyrighted by Don Howard Koplow, a high school student who had learned the song secondhand and recorded it under the name "Don Howard"; the song's originator, Nancy Binns Reed, heard the record and within weeks of its release sued to claim songwriter credit. Reed and Koplow eventually settled, with each receiving co-writer credits. Concurrently with Howard's original acoustic pop recording, concurrent cover versions by two established acts, the Lawrence Welk Orchestra (whose version featured a now-famous basso profondo lead vocal by Larry Hooper) and the Four Knights, were also released; for a time in 1953, all three versions were top-10 hits.

== Structure ==
The song is set in a basic four-chord progression, either I-vi-ii-V7 or I-vi-IV-V7 depending on the musical arrangement. The song has four verses of eight bars each, with no refrain or chorus, sung and performed in a slow swing rhythm.

While different covers of "Oh Happy Day" phrased the lyrics somewhat differently, the official sheet music for the initial hit version by Don Howard has the following lyrics:

The sun is shining, Oh Happy Day, No more troubles and no skies of gray, Ever since you said those words to me, You said you loved me, I know it's true. My life's complete, dear, for now I have you. Oh Happy Day, Oh lucky me.

Howard originally performed it in the key of E♭ major. Rhythmic errors in Howard's playing, audible especially in the first verse, were left in the finished product.

== Origins ==
"Oh Happy Day" was one of the first pop hits whose momentum was driven by the high-school teen set. Don Howard Koplow sang it accompanied by his guitar before his classmates at Cleveland Heights High School, in Cleveland, Ohio. At a Saturday high-school dance, the boys and girls called 13 times for "Oh Happy Day". This convinced Koplow to put the song on wax. Once it was played on the air, teenage fans besieged the disc jockey, Phil McLean of radio station WERE with requests that kept him spinning the song all week. Calls began coming in from nearby cities, and it was decided the record should go to market. A contract was signed in early November 1952 and "Oh Happy Day" went on sale. Upon release by a brand new record company (Triple A), 21,000 copies quickly sold around Cleveland. Then the record was leased to another label (Essex) for national distribution. By February 1953, it was pushing the half-million mark. The disc credited Koplow as the composer, who sang under the professional name "Don Howard." His simple solo rendition, with no orchestra or backup singers, became known as a "garage hit."

Time Magazine reported in 1953 that "Oh Happy Day" had a "folklike origin: Donnie heard it sung by an Ohio State girlfriend, who had picked it up on the campus. Donnie worked it out on his guitar, changed it a bit, wrote some lyrics, sang it at parties and prudently got it copyrighted." Six weeks later, while "Oh Happy Day" was still on the pop charts, the Washington Post reported that Nancy Binns Reed, a 28-year-old housewife, had filed a lawsuit to prove that she wrote the song. Represented by Lee Eastman (father of Linda McCartney), a New York copyright and show business attorney, Mrs. Reed obtained affidavits from persons who had heard her singing the song when serving as a counselor at various camps and when she attended the University of California in the 1940s. She stated that many campers and high-school and college friends had learned the song. The lawsuit resulted in an out-of-court cash settlement along with an agreement that Mrs. Reed and Mr. Koplow share equal credit for the song's words and music. Music Views magazine reported in its June 1953 edition that Koplow's girlfriend had graduated from a girl's camp, where Ms. Reed had served as a counselor.

== Chart performance ==
"Oh Happy Day" (not to be confused with the gospel hit of the same name) was known as the "people's hit" since it became a national United States hit song as well as an international hit without any initial support from the music industry. Because the song was credited to an amateur, it flew under the radar of professionals in the music business. Bandleader Lawrence Welk agreed to record it as a vehicle for his bass-voiced singer, Larry Hooper. Hooper recalled, "We got ahold of a tune to record that nobody else wanted, and we gambled with it."

The song reached US number 3 in Cashbox and number 4 and 3 in Billboard′s two national charts, respectively) and Australia singles charts at number 1. Time Magazine called it the "Mystery Hit" and described it as the "rarest kind of hit, unplanned and unplugged." It was first released on record by Don Howard in early November 1952. Within two months, Don Howard's "Oh Happy Day" was still going up the charts, when two other versions of the same song by Lawrence Welk and by the Four Knights also went up the US hit charts, Lawrence Welk's version reaching number 5 (Billboard US national charts) and the Four Knights' version reaching number 8 (Billboard US national charts).

"Oh Happy Day" by Don Howard reached number 4 on the Billboard Chart. The Billboard confusion arises from the fact that Billboard printed two charts. One ranking for individual artist recordings of a song and one for combined sales of a song by all of the recorded versions. The number 3 ranking for "Oh Happy Day" in Billboard came from the Billboard "Honor Roll of Hits" listing. That ranking included all versions of "Oh Happy Day," not just the Don Howard version. The number 4 ranking in Billboard came from the chart listing "The Best Sellers in Stores" and only included sales of the Don Howard version. It did reach number 3 on the Cashbox Chart, which like the "Honor Roll of Hits" included all recordings of the same song.

In reaching number 1 in Australia, this feat was achieved the week of July 18, 1953, several months after Oh Happy Day charted in the United States. The versions of Oh Happy Day performed by Lawrence Welk and by the Four Knights were cited together as the versions which made Oh Happy Day the number 1 hit in Australia. See Wikipedia article "List of number-one singles in Australia during the 1950s."

== Other versions ==
Other performers released recorded versions of "Oh Happy Day" following the initial success by Don Howard. The January 10, 1953, edition of Billboard cited Lawrence Welk's version (Coral) as a likely upcoming hit, and noted in its January 17, 1953 edition that the versions by Four Knights (Capitol) and Dick Todd (Decca) were also likely upcoming hits. Other versions released by January 1953 in the US were those by J. Johnson (V), Mickey Baker (Savoy) and Ken Griffin (Columbia). In the Billboard Territorial Best Sellers (Popular) charts for the 15 top markets in the US, Don Howard's version had the greatest success, a number 1 ranking in Chicago, Philadelphia and New Orleans and number 2 rankings in Pittsburgh and St. Louis. The Four Knights achieved a number 1 ranking in Seattle and a number 2 ranking in Atlanta. Lawrence Welk, in turn, achieved a number 2 ranking in the Los Angeles and Denver markets. Finally, during the same time period that various versions of "Oh Happy Day" were on the national US hit chart, Dick Todd's version charted at number 3 in New Orleans.

"Oh Happy Day" is the only song that charted three different versions of the song in the top ten at the same time during calendar year 1953. This unprecedented achievement was otherwise unmatched for other years as well. One million records are estimated to have been sold of "Oh Happy Day" by June 1953.

== Legacy and influence ==
In terms of legacy and influence, "Oh Happy Day" has been performed by numerous artists of various persuasions and interests. Folk versions (accompaniment by acoustic guitar only) were performed by Don Howard, Mickey Baker, Dolph Dixon, and Elvis Presley. Don Howard's version has been released on a recent CD compilation entitled Songs That Inspired the King in reference to Elvis Presley. Elvis is known to have performed "Oh Happy Day" during the dress rehearsal for his 1968 Comeback Show and at an August 5, 1976, concert at the Sahara in Las Vegas. He described the chord arrangement on "Oh Happy Day" as representative of early rock and roll, stating "Oh Happy Day" was similar to the songs "Blue Moon" and "Young Love" in this regard. See Elvis's voice over on the CD From Burbank to Vegas, recorded at the Burbank Studios, Hollywood, where the 1968 dress rehearsal for the 1968 Comeback Show took place. The arrangement of Lawrence Welk's "Oh Happy Day" has also been described as early rock and roll. A more traditional big band 1940s sound is heard in the rendition by Geraldo and His Orchestra (UK). Other versions demonstrate a jazz orientation or influence including those by Jimmy Giuffre, Dick Erickson and Ron Levin and Milt Levitt Orchestra. Other international versions were performed by the Johnston Brothers (number 4 in the UK); Pilgrim With Rhythm Quartette (UK), Don Cameron (UK), Dave Carey (UK), Leo Heppe u.d. Continentals & Lutz Alberecht u.s. Orchester (Germany and sung in German); Mieke Telkamp (Germany) and Dick Todd (Canada). The Four Knights rendition has been described as early doo-wop rock and roll and several more explicitly doo-wop versions followed in the 1950s and 1960s by the Singing Belles, the Skylites, Dion, Rick Martell & the Angels, the Five Satins, and Stephanie & the Gothics. Dion's "Oh Happy Day", recorded in 1963, has been described as a stand-out doo-wop recording on his "Bronx Blues: The Columbia Recordings” album. Other artists that have recorded "Oh Happy Day" include Tab Hunter, the Four Lads, Homer & Jethro, Kamahl, Bill Buchanan, the Honey Dreamers and Don McPherson and the Hy-powers. Homer & Jethro's "Unhappy Day", a parody of "Oh Happy Day", stays faithful to the melody and brings forth a chuckle.

Not only did the teenagers set a pervasive influence in making "Oh Happy Day" a national and international hit, the song was heavily performed by local artists throughout the US. In 1953 it was performed at minstrel shows, various high-school assemblies, homecoming festivities, music programs in farming communities, and at talent shows.

The Welk arrangement of the song would become a regular feature on Welk's Dodge Dancing Party and its succeeding television shows, becoming Larry Hooper's signature song.
