= Jerry Burke =

American musician (1911–1965)

- Born: July 26, 1911 Marshalltown, Iowa
- Died: February 13, 1965 (aged 53)
- Occupation: Musician
- Instrument(s): Organ, piano
- Years active: 1934–1965
- Formerly of: Lawrence Welk orchestra

Jerry Burke (July 26, 1911 – February 13, 1965) was a musician who played the organ and piano for the Lawrence Welk orchestra from 1934 to 1965.

== Biography ==
Born in Marshalltown, Iowa; he spent most of his youth in South Dakota; first in Aberdeen, where he took up the pipe organ and taught piano. After playing with several other local bands, he joined Lawrence Welk's band in 1934 when the band consisted of only six people and was headquartered in Yankton.

Jerry's career with the band spanned more than thirty years, from the one-nighters throughout the Midwest, at radio station WNAX, later in Chicago at the Aragon Ballroom and in Southern California on television, first locally and later nationwide on the Lawrence Welk Show on the ABC network, from 1934 to 1965, where he played Hammond organ, accordion, celeste and piano. His talents with the keyboard instruments, such as the Novachord were a perfect fit to Welk's champagne music. He also recorded several solo albums of his work as well.

In his later years, Jerry was absent from the show for nearly a year (1963–1964) due to ill health and would die in 1965 from cancer. Burke's replacement, Bob Ralston, would remain with the show for the remainder of its run.
