= Clay Hart =

American singer and guitarist

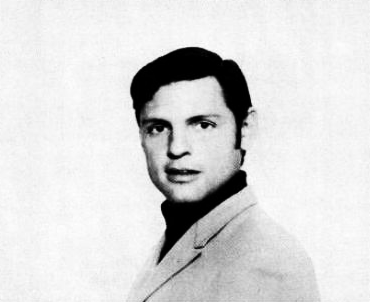
- Clay Hart in 1969

Background information
- Born: Henry Clay Hart III; July 1, 1936; Providence, Rhode Island, U.S.
- Died: July 28, 2022 (aged 86) Cocoa, Florida, U.S.
- Genres: Country
- Occupation: Singer
- Years active: 1969–1975
- Labels: Metromedia

Henry Clay Hart III (July 1, 1936 – July 28, 2022) was an American country music singer and guitarist who was a member of The Lawrence Welk Show television program from 1969 to 1975.

== Biography ==
Born Henry Clay Hart, III, and reared in Providence, Rhode Island; he attended Amherst College in Amherst, Massachusetts, as a theater arts major. Although his passion was in music, he worked as a salesman in a record shop in New York City after graduation and later as a foreign credit analyst on Wall Street but those jobs were brief, for he proceeded to pursue a music career, often performing in small clubs.

While performing in West Virginia, Hart was discovered by Lawrence Welk who was there for a luncheon on behalf of the Cancer Crusade. Impressed with his talent, the maestro signed him as a member of the Champagne Music Makers, where he made his first network television appearance in July 1969.

Hart replaced Lynn Anderson as the show's resident country singer and remained on the show in that capacity until 1975. During Hart's time on the show, he was nominated for the Grammy Award for Best Male Country Vocal Performance for his 1969 single "Spring", but lost to Johnny Cash.

He released a solo album, Clay Hart: Most Requested Country Favorites from the Ranwood Records label. For several years Hart focused on concert tours and was not recording, but in 1973 he worked with Tommy Alsop to release a new recording from Ranwood.

Hart married Sally Flynn, on December 6, 1974. Flynn had been a vocalist on the Welk show until 1972. The two later became a country singing duo that has opened for stars such as Mel Tillis, Red Skelton, and Juliet Prowse. The couple later taped wraparound segments for reruns of the Welk Show on PBS and have toured the US with their fellow Welk stars in the Forever Blowing Bubbles concert series.

Hart had two children, Elizabeth and Hank, from a previous marriage. Since the show, he had appeared on The Nashville Network, and had operated a tote bag business with Flynn. They made their home in Cocoa Beach, Florida, until his death in 2022.

== Discography ==
=== Albums ===
Year	Album	US Country	Label
1969	Spring	38	Metromedia
	Most Requested Country		Ranwood
	Travelin' Minstrel Man		Ranwood
	Smile of Joy		Ragamuffin

=== Singles ===
Year	Single	Chart positions		Album
Year	Single	US Country	CAN Country	Album
1969	"Spring"	30	—	Spring
1969	"Another Day, Another Mile, Another Highway"	25	2	singles only
1970	"Face of a Dear Friend"	73	—	singles only
1970	"If I'd Only Come and Gone"	62	13	singles only
