= The Lawrence Welk Show =

American weekly TV variety series (1951–1982)

- Opening of The Lawrence Welk Show
- Presented by: Lawrence Welk
- Starring: Myron Floren; Bobby Burgess; Norma Zimmer; Dick Dale; The Lennon Sisters; Arthur Duncan; Ken Delo; Joe Feeney; Jack Imel; Dave Edwards; Sandi Griffiths; Tanya Falan; Ava Barber; Ralna English; Guy Hovis; Gail Farrell; Mary Lou Metzger; Natalie Nevins; Anacani; Bob Ralston; Jo Ann Castle; Frank Scott; Bob Lido; Nick Addante; Steve Smith; Henry Cuesta
- Opening theme: Bubbles in the Wine (1951–1956); Champagne Time (1956–1976); Fanfare (1976–1982)
- Ending theme: Bubbles in the Wine (1951–1971); Adios, Au Revoir, Auf Wiedersehen (1971–1982)
- Country of origin: United States
- No. of episodes: 1,065 (black-and-white, 1951 to September 1965; in color from September 1965 onwards to 1982)

Production
- Running time: 44 minutes
- Production companies: KTLA (1951–1955); Teleklew Productions (1955–1982); American Broadcasting Company (1955–1971)

Original release
- Network: KTLA (1951–1955); ABC (1955–1971); Syndicated (1971–1982)
- Release: May 11, 1951 – April 17, 1982

The Lawrence Welk Show is an American televised musical variety show hosted by big band leader Lawrence Welk. The series aired locally in Los Angeles for four years, from 1951 to 1955, then nationally for another 16 years on ABC from 1955 to 1971, followed by 11 years in first-run syndication from 1971 to 1982. Repeat episodes are broadcast in the United States by PBS stations. These airings incorporate an original program—usually, a color broadcast from 1965 to 1982—in its entirety. In place of the commercials, newer performance and interview clips from the original stars and/or a family member of the performers are included; these clips are occasionally updated.

== Broadcast history ==
=== KTLA ===
On May 11, 1951, The Lawrence Welk Show began as a local program on KTLA in Los Angeles, the flagship station of the Paramount Television Network. The original show was broadcast from the since-demolished Aragon Ballroom at Venice Beach. In 1954, Paramount announced plans to distribute the show nationwide, plans that never materialized due to Paramount's feuds with DuMont Television Network that led to the collapse of both.

=== ABC ===
The show made its national television debut on the American Broadcasting Company on July 2, 1955, and was initially produced at the Hollywood Palladium, moving to stage 5 at the ABC Television Center at Prospect Avenue and Talmadge Street in Hollywood shortly afterwards. The show was filmed there for 23 of its 27 years on national television.

When the show debuted nationwide, The Lawrence Welk Show was billed as the Dodge Dancing Party in 1955 and 1956. From 1956 to 1959, Lawrence Welk was broadcast two nights per week. The second show's title was Lawrence Welk Presents Top Tunes and New Talent (1956–58) and then Lawrence Welk's Plymouth Show (1958–59). The Plymouth show was the first American television program to air in stereophonic sound. Because stereophonic television had not yet been invented (it would be 25 more years before it would become standard), ABC simulcast the show on its radio network, with the TV side airing one audio channel and the radio side airing the other; viewers would tune in both the TV and the radio to achieve the stereophonic effect. Starting with the 1959–60 season the two shows were merged into The Lawrence Welk Show, reverting to monophonic broadcasts. During this early period, Chrysler also provided the show's announcers: Lou Crosby represented the Dodge shows, while James Narz represented Plymouth. (When it became known that Chrysler's rival Ford employed Narz's older brother Jack, they changed James's name to Tom Kennedy to avoid confusion between the two; Kennedy was moved to Date with the Angels in 1957. Bob Warren handled announcing duties.

By 1956, Welk also collaborated with Ben Selvin at RCA Thesaurus to release electrical transcriptions of "The New Lawrence Welk Show" for broadcast on local radio stations which were affiliated with leading national radio networks.

The 1965–66 season was taped at the Hollywood Palace as it was, at the time, ABC's only West Coast TV studio equipped for color production; Welk had insisted on transitioning the show to color in 1965, convinced that broadcasting in color was essential to maintaining the program's success. The first color episode of the show, which aired in September 1965, was taped at Welk's resort in Escondido. The show returned to the ABC Television Center in 1966 after some of its studios were converted to color. The show returned to filming at the Hollywood Palace for the 1976–77 season, moved to CBS's Television City studios from 1977 to 1979, and then returned to the ABC Television Center in 1979, where it remained for the rest of its run.

The primary sponsor of The Lawrence Welk Show was initially Dodge. In 1960, Geritol took over sponsorship; Sominex, Aqua Velva, Serutan, Universal Appliances, Polident, Ocean Spray and Sinclair Oil were some of the other companies or brands which served as associate sponsors for a short time. (During later years, a number of Welk cast members appeared in commercials for many of the show's sponsors, filmed specifically to air during Welk broadcasts.)

The Lawrence Welk Show was canceled by ABC in 1971 amidst the rural purge and implementation of the Prime Time Access Rule.

=== Move to syndication and public television ===
In response to the show's cancellation, Welk started his own production company and continued producing the show for syndication. Some independent stations put it in its old Saturday timeslot, and in many cases, it drew higher ratings than the network shows scheduled at that time. In many markets, the syndicated Lawrence Welk Show aired before the start of network prime-time on Saturday nights (7 p.m. Eastern Time), often competing against another show that was canceled during the rural purge and resurrected in syndication, also in 1971—Hee Haw. The success of Lawrence Welk and Hee Haw in syndication, and the network decisions that led to their respective cancellations, were the inspiration for a novelty song called "The Lawrence Welk-Hee Haw Counter-Revolution Polka", performed by Roy Clark, one of the co-stars of Hee Haw. These programs were among a group of syndicated niche programs, including Soul Train, that flourished during this era.

Lawrence Welk retired and production of the weekly television program ended in 1982. At the time of his retirement, Welk was 79 years old, matching The Gay Nineties Revue host Joe Howard to become the oldest host of a regularly scheduled US entertainment television series (a feat later surpassed by Bob Barker in 2003 and later by Betty White in 2012). Reruns—largely episodes first aired from 1967 to 1982—were repackaged with new footage (either Welk or the show's cast introducing segments) for syndication as Memories with Lawrence Welk. In 1985, The Lawrence Welk Christmas Reunion was produced. It was the last show in which Welk appeared with the Musical Family.

In March 1987, the Oklahoma Educational Television Authority produced and released a documentary film, Lawrence Welk: Television's Music Man, hosted by Kathy Lennon of The Lennon Sisters. The film was a retrospective on Welk's life and career, featuring interviews with surviving members of Welk's Musical Family, and scenes from the show; it was part of a new approach to pledge drive programming that aimed to lure donors with popular music and nostalgia, an approach that later became standard at other public television stations. The film was so successful that the OETA acquired rerun rights to the program and began offering them to stations nationwide that October. Welk's segments from Memories with Lawrence Welk were used until his death, after which members of the Musical Family took over as hosts. Reruns, with updated interviews from cast members, continue to air to this day (in many markets airing on Saturday nights at 7 pm, the same time the show aired during the latter years of its original run). The shows are occasionally "recut" and interspersed with segments from other episodes.

Most episodes rerun on PBS stations originally aired between the show's color conversion in 1965 to 1982, the majority being from the syndicated run.

=== Nielsen ratings ===
The show was most highly rated during the mid to late 1960s and was a top 30 hit for five seasons, according to ClassicTVHits.com's ratings database.

- 1964–65: No. 30 (22.00 rating)
- 1965–66: No. 19 (22.40 rating)
- 1966–67: No. 12 (22.79 rating)
- 1967–68: No. 17 (21.90 rating)
- 1968–69: No. 29 (20.50 rating)

== Format ==
The show would often open by showing bubbles floating around and was accompanied by a sound effect of a bottle of champagne opening, followed by the opening theme (originally "Bubbles in the Wine", composed by Welk and Frank Loesser, later replaced with a derivative theme, "Champagne Time", adding a fanfare composed by George Cates). Welk frequently demonstrated on camera how the champagne bottle sound was created. He would place a finger in his mouth, release it to produce a popping sound, and then make a soft hissing noise to mimic bubbles escaping the bottle. One such demonstration is included in the opening sequence of the public television reruns.

Each week, Welk would present the show's theme, which was followed by either an orchestral performance or a group number featuring the entire cast of singers from the Musical Family. Welk introduced most of the acts throughout the episode, delivering his monologues in a distinctive German accent. The accent became a hallmark of his persona and was frequently parodied in popular culture, including by Welk himself (two books he authored, his autobiography Wunnerful, Wunnerful! and Ah-One, Ah-Two! were so titled because they were his catchphrases). Welk's accent sometimes led to notable mispronunciations of scripted lines from cue cards. In Wunnerful, Wunnerful!, Welk bemoaned his accent, and in some of his pronunciations of "wonderful" in the show he can be heard forcing the D.

For certain songs, particularly instrumentals performed by the orchestra, couples in the audience were invited to dance in the studio. Welk himself often joined in, dancing with members of the audience. Many of the show's songs were performed as part of a skit, especially during the show's later years.

The Musical Family performed a wide range of music, including adult standards and big band numbers, as well as renditions of pop, country, Christian, and patriotic songs. Welk had a particular admiration for composers contemporary with him, such as Hoagy Carmichael, Henry Mancini, Johnny Mercer, Cole Porter, and Harry Warren. Welk stated in 1956 that his Musical Family could perform any song "as long as it's done in the champagne style".

In one of the show's most infamous incidents, singers Gail Farrell and Dick Dale performed "One Toke Over the Line" (a mock gospel song riddled with drug references) as a modern spiritual in a 1971 episode, apparently oblivious to the meaning of the word "toke." Songwriter Mike Brewer responded that although it was "absurd", his Brewer & Shipley duo "got more publicity than we could pay for" from the out-of-place performance. Welk blamed ABC for pressuring him into including the song, among others he felt did not fit the show's format.

Nearly all the music on the show was performed in-house by the Musical Family, with guest appearances being a rarity. Notable exceptions included performances by artists such as Henry Mancini, Eddie Peabody, the Osmond Brothers, The Chantays, Stan Boreson, Charley Pride, Jack Benny, and Barbara Mandrell.

The closing theme during the syndicated years, with lyrics often performed by the "Musical Family", was "Adios, Au Revoir, Auf Wiedersehen" (composed by George Cates). A recording of the song has been edited over the updated credits on PBS reruns.

=== The Musical Family ===
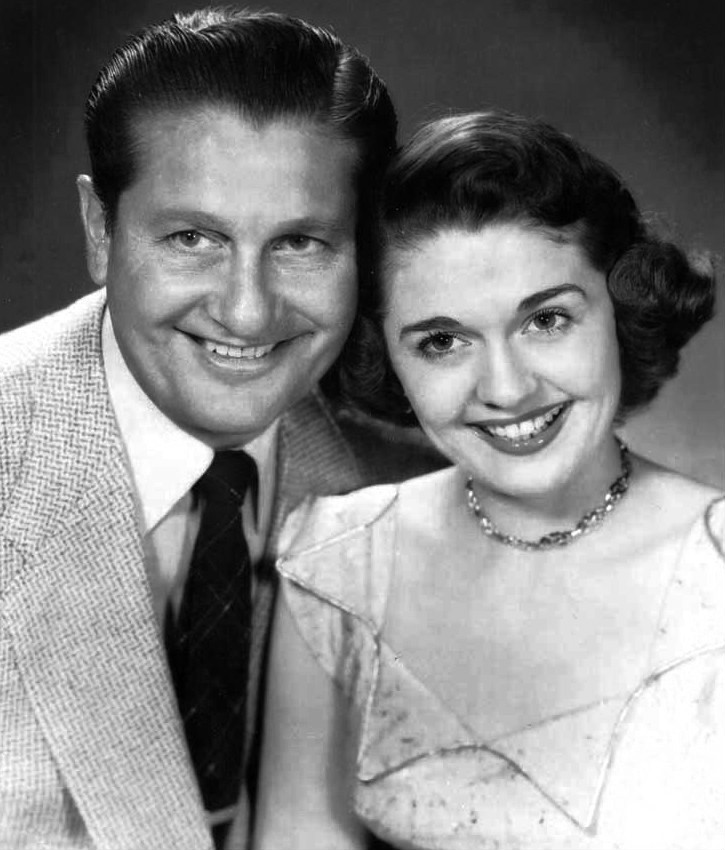
Alice Lon and Lawrence Welk.

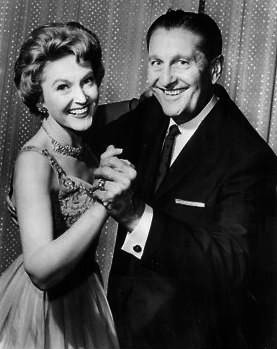
Norma Zimmer and Welk.

Welk's performers were known as his Musical Family. Most members of the Musical Family had specific, well-defined roles within the context of the show, generally specializing in one type of performance. One of the most prominent positions in the Musical Family was the "Champagne Lady", who always sang a down-tempo solo number in every episode. Norma Zimmer was the longest running Champagne Lady, appearing on the show from 1960 to 1982.

The Musical Family followed an unofficial code of conservative artistic and personal morals set by Welk. Welk closely monitored fan letters to gauge performers' popularity, giving more prominent roles to those who received positive feedback. Performers who failed to resonate with the audience often saw their solo opportunities decrease and were sometimes ultimately fired. In 1959, Welk fired Champagne Lady Alice Lon, prompting thousands of viewers to write to Welk demanding an apology and her reinstatement. Although Welk attempted to rehire her, Lon declined.

Welk's conservative artistic standards put him at odds with clarinetist Pete Fountain, who reportedly left the show after Welk took issue with his attempt to perform a jazz version "Silver Bells" during the show's 1958 Christmas special. In an interview, Fountain stated he left The Lawrence Welk Show because "Champagne and bourbon don't mix."

Among the performers that were popular with audiences during the ABC era were The Lennon Sisters, Joe Feeney, Steve Smith, Larry Hooper, Jo Ann Castle and Buddy Merrill. Lynn Anderson, Clay Hart, and Ava Barber used the show as a springboard to launch careers as country music solo artists. At the height of the show's popularity, members of the Musical Family were featured in several celebrity tabloid magazines alongside other mainstream television and movie stars.

Tap dancer Arthur Duncan became the second African-American to appear regularly on a sponsored television variety program, and the first since 1951, when he was hired as a permanent music maker by Welk in 1964.

== Producers and directors ==
James Hobson (also known as Jim Hobson) served longest as producer (1962–1982) and director of The Lawrence Welk Show. Hobson died on April 26, 2013, in Santa Monica Hospital, California.

== Episode status ==
The surviving episodes from the first 10 seasons on ABC exist today as black and white kinescopes or videotape, as the show was broadcast live through the 1964–1965 season. Beginning with the 1965–1966 season, the episodes were recorded in color. It is assumed the color episodes exist intact.

=== DVD status and Welk specials aired on public television ===
Neither the Welk Organization nor the Oklahoma Educational Television Authority have released any episodes of The Lawrence Welk Show on home video, nor are there any plans to do so. Welk Musical Family specials, however, are available on DVD, and can be obtained with a donation during reairs on local PBS stations.

- 1991: "A Champagne Toast to the Big Bands"
- 1992: "The Lennon Sisters: Easy to Remember"
- 1993: "From the Heart: A Tribute to Lawrence Welk and the American Dream"
- 1994: "The Lawrence Welk Holiday Special: Great Moments & Memories"
- 1995: "Lawrence Welk: Then & Now"
- 1995: "A Lawrence Welk Family Christmas"
- 1997: "From Lawrence Welk: To America With Love"
- 1998: "Lawrence Welk’s Favorite Holidays"
- 1999: "Lawrence Welk’s Songs of Faith"
- 2000: "Lawrence Welk Milestones & Memories"
- 2003: "Lawrence Welk: God Bless America"
- 2005: "Lawrence Welk Precious Memories"
- 2007: "Lawrence Welk's TV Treasures"
- 2009: "Welk Stars Through The Years"
- 2011: "Lawrence Welk's Big Band Splash"
- 2025: "Lawrence Welk: A North Dakota Farm Boy" (produced by Prairie Public)

== In popular culture ==
=== In music ===
- Accordion pop/rock band Those Darn Accordions recorded "The Story of Lawrence Welk" on their 1994 album Squeeze This!, a comic retelling of Welk's life story which references his television series, incorporating musical bits from "Bubbles in the Wine" and name-dropping series regulars Alice Lon, The Lennon Sisters and the show's sponsorships from Dodge and Geritol.
- Stan Freberg created a parody of the show in a song called "Wun'erful Wun'erful (Sides uh-one and uh-two)", which became a Top 30 hit in 1957. Originally performed on Freberg's CBS Radio series, the single spoofed the musicianship among some of Welk's musicians (including Welk himself). The record was arranged by Billy May, who handled the music on Freberg sessions and was known to despise Welk's style of music. Working with May and Freberg, who portrayed Welk, were Hollywood studio musicians who held Welk's music in equal contempt. Welk was not pleased by the record, built around satirical out-of-tune performances and an out-of-control "bubble machine" that sent the entire Aragon Ballroom out to sea.
- Dickie Goodman also used Welk as a source for inspiration and a target of satire on his 1959 novelty single, "Stagger Lawrence", which featured an episode of the show being repeatedly interrupted by Lloyd Price's version of the blues piece "Stagger Lee."
- The show is one of two that serve as the main subjects of the 1972 song "The Lawrence Welk-Hee Haw Counter-Revolution Polka," the other being Hee Haw (Hee Haw host Roy Clark sang the song). Both programs had been canceled by their respective networks in 1971, only to continue in first-run syndication (and be enormously popular) for several years thereafter.

=== In television ===
- On October 4, 2008, Saturday Night Live parodied the show with Fred Armisen portraying Welk. The sketch features the four singing Maharelle sisters (a parody of the Lennon Sisters) "all the way from the Finger Lakes". The sketch—and Kristen Wiig's character Dooneese Maharelle (a particularly awkward sister) proved so popular with audiences that the Welk parody became a recurring sketch over the next few seasons.
- In "The Ride", episode 6.09 of The Sopranos, Paulie Walnuts watch a December 1975 episode of The Lawrence Welk Show with his aunt, Marianucci Gualtieri, who refers to it as The Lawrence Welk's Program. They have very little dialogue and the show is prominently featured in the scene. The music from the show leads into the credits.
- The 1970s sitcom Welcome Back, Kotter used the Welk show as a source of comedic material. One episode involved a scene when Arnold Horshack, upon noticing a kitchen sink overflowing with bubbles, yelled "Help! We're being invaded by Lawrence Welk!"
- A September 1961 episode of The Flintstones titled "The Hit Song Writers" featured a sendup of The Lawrence Welk Show in which Daws Butler voiced a Stone-Age Welk.

== Singers and performers ==
All of these singers and performers were part of the Musical Family, with Welk on the lead.

- The Aldridge Sisters, singers (1977–1982)
- Anacani, singer, dancer (1973–1982)
- Lynn Anderson, singer (1967–1968)
- Ron Anderson, singer (1980–1982), Gail, Ron & Michael
- Ava Barber, singer (1974–1982)
- The Blenders, singers (1965–1967)
- Barbara Boylan, dancer (1961–1967, 1979)
- Bob Ballard, conductor (1976–1982)
- Bobby Burgess, dancer (1961–1982)
- Jo Ann Castle, honky-tonk pianist (1959–1969)
- Joey Schmidt, accordionist (1977–1982)
- Jamie Corey, singer (1976–1977)
- Dick Dale, saxophonist/singer (1955–1982)
- Larry Dean, singer (1956–1962)
- Ken Delo, singer (1969–1982)
- Arthur Duncan, tap dancer (1964–1982)
- Ralna English, singer (1969–1982), Guy & Ralna
- Tanya Falan, singer (1967–1977)
- Gail Farrell, singer (1969–1982), Gail, Sandi & Mary Lou and Gail, Ron & Michael
- Joe Feeney, singer (1957–1982)
- Myron Floren, accordionist (1955–1982), assistant conductor (1955–1973)
- Sally Flynn, singer (1968–1972), Sandi & Sally
- Sandi Griffiths, singer (1968–1980), Sandi & Sally and Gail, Sandi & Mary Lou
- Clay Hart, guitarist/singer (1969–1975)
- Larry Hooper, singer/piano (1951–1969, 1973–1980)
- Guy Hovis, singer (1970–1982), Guy & Ralna
- Jack Imel, percussionist/tap dancer (1957–1982)
- Cissy King, dancer (1967–1978)
- The Lennon Sisters, singers (1955–1968)
- Alice Lon, singer/Champagne Lady (1955–1959)
- Mary Lou Metzger, singer/tap dancer (1970–1982), Gail, Sandi & Mary Lou
- Tom Netherton, singer (1973–1982)
- Natalie Nevins, singer (1965–1969)
- Cubby O'Brien, drummer/singer (1958–1959)
- Elaine Niverson, dancer (1979–1982)
- The Otwell Twins, singers (1977–1982)
- Maurice Pearson, singer (1957–1960)
- Bob Ralston, piano/organ soloist, musical arranger, dancer, singer (1963–1982)
- Curt Ramsey, musical arranger, trumpet player, singer, and librarian (1955–1982), Curt Ramsey Quintet
- Michael Redman, singer (1980–1982), Gail, Ron & Michael
- Jimmy Roberts, singer (1955–1982)
- The Semonski Sisters, singers (1975–1977)
- Bob Smale, pianist (1969–1982)
- Steve Smith, singer (1965–1969), The Blenders from 1965 to 1967
- Kathie Sullivan, singer (1976–1982)
- Jim Turner, guitarist/singer (1979–1982)
- Andra Willis, singer (1967–1969)
- Norma Zimmer, singer/Champagne Lady (1960–1982)

=== The band ===
- Orie Amodeo, saxophone/reeds (1955–1970)
- George Aubry, saxophone/reeds (1951–1957)
- Norman Bailey, trumpet (1955–1973)
- Big Tiny Little, ragtime piano (1955–1959)
- Don Bonnee, saxophone/reeds (1959–1962)
- Bobby Bruce, violin (1964–1967)
- Jerry Burke, piano/organ (1951–1965)
- George Cates, music supervisor (1955–1982), conductor (1973–1982)
- Dick Cathcart, trumpet (1962–1968)
- Buddy Clark, bass/tuba (1966–1967)
- Mahlon Clark, saxophone/reeds (1962–1968)
- Henry Cuesta, saxophone/clarinet (1972–1982)
- Bob Davis, saxophone/reeds (1965–1982)
- Art Depew, trumpet (1957–1965)
- Kurt Dieterle, violin (1959–1961)
- Jack Dumont, saxophone/reeds (1959–1962)
- Dave Edwards, saxophone/reeds (1968–1979)
- Ernie Ehrhardt, cellist (1978–1982)
- Pete Fountain, saxophonist/clarinet (1957–1959)
- Jimmy Getzhoff, violin (1960–1962)
- Woody Guidry, trumpet (1955–1956)
- Charlotte Harris, cellist (1961–1978)
- Stanley Harris, violist (1959–1960)
- Bob Havens, trombone (1960–1982)
- Buddy Hayes, bass/tuba (1955–1966)
- Jimmy Henderson, trombone (1957–1959)
- Skeets Herfurt, saxophone/reeds (1979–1982)
- Laroon Holt, trumpet (1973–1982)
- Peanuts Hucko, saxophone/clarinet (1970–1972)
- Paul Humphrey, drummer (1976–1982)
- Harry Hyams, viola (1961–1982)
- Dick Kesner, violin (1955–1960)
- Johnny Klein, drummer (1955–1976)
- Russ Klein, saxophone/reeds (1957–1982)
- Neil LeVang, guitarist (1959–1982)
- Barney Liddell, trombone (1955–1982)
- Bob Lido, violin/performer (1955–1982)
- Ray Linn, trumpet (1968–1969)
- Joe Livoti, violin (1962–1982)
- Pete Lofthouse, trombone (1955–1965)
- Warren Luening, trumpet (1959–1960)
- Richard Maloof, bass/tuba (1967–1982)
- Freddie Mandock, saxophone (1969–1977)
- Sam McCadden, saxophone/performer (1955–1980)
- Mickey McMahan, trumpet (1967–1982)
- Jack Martin, saxophone/reeds (1955–1959)
- Buddy Merrill, guitarist (1955–1974)
- Bill Page, saxophone/reeds (1955–1965)
- Aladdin Pallante, violin/performer (1955–1967)
- Charlie Parlato, trumpet (1962–1982)
- Jim Porter, trumpet (1965)
- David Pratt, cellist (1959–1961)
- Bob Ralston, piano/organ (1963–1982)
- Rocky Rockwell, trumpet (1955–1962)
- Mischa Russell, violin (1962–1964)
- Ambrose Russo, violin (1962–1964)
- Frank Scott, piano/harpsichord (1955–1969)
- Bob Smale, piano (1969–1982)
- Don Staples, trombone (1965–1982)
- Rick Sweet, steel guitar (1958–1961)
- George Thow, trumpet/production staff (1956–1982)
- Kenny Trimble, trombone (1957–1982)
- Billy Wright, violin (1957–1959)
- Rubin Zarchy, trumpet (1968)
- Johnny Zell, trumpet (1968–1982)

Rose Weiss was the long-term Welk costume designer and manager.

== Announcers ==
- James Narz (1956–1957)
- Lou Crosby (1955–1960)
- Bob Warren (1960–1982)
