= Welk Music Group =

American record company

Welk Music Group is an American record company comprising Ranwood Records. It was founded by Lawrence Welk and is still owned by the Welk Family. The company evolved from when Welk's Teleklew Productions acquired Harry Von Tilzer Music in 1957.

Welk Music sold its music publishing business to PolyGram International Music Publishing in 1988. This included T. B. Harms, Hall-Clement, and Harry Von Tilzer Music.

On April 1, 2015, Concord Records acquired both Vanguard Records and Sugar Hill Records from Welk Music Group.

== See also ==
- List of record labels
- Ranwood Records
