= Gail Farrell =

American singer and songwriter

- Born: October 6, 1947 (age 78); Salinas, California
- Education: University of Tulsa; Juilliard School of Music
- Known for: The Lawrence Welk Show
- Spouse: Ron Anderson (m. 1979; died 2024)
- Children: 2

Gail Farrell (born October 6, 1947) is an American singer and songwriter, best known for her work on the variety program The Lawrence Welk Show.

== Early life ==
Born in Salinas, California, Farrell grew up in Durant, Oklahoma. Her father was a cattle rancher and her mother was a plumber. She learned music from her mother who taught her piano lessons while her father taught her to ride horses. She began to perform publicly at age six at rodeos and talent shows, in church, and on pickup beds on the back of trucks stumping for local political candidates. She also learned how to sing gospel music from her grandmother. While attending the University of Tulsa, majoring in piano performance, she took part in the Miss Oklahoma Pageant and won in talent and swimsuit competitions. She also attended the Juilliard School of Music in New York during the summer to further hone her talents as a piano player.

== Career ==
After graduating magna cum laude in 1969, Farrell flew out to Los Angeles, California to become a pre-school music teacher, but decided to audition for Lawrence Welk since he and his band performed every Saturday night at the Hollywood Palladium. She got the maestro's attention in a tag dance, tapping him on the shoulder and asking if she can sing for him. She sang "Cotton Fields" in front of 3,000 people at the Palladium. Welk asked her to appear on the opening broadcast the following September. She officially joined the Musical Family three shows into the 1969–70 season and over the course of the next twelve years, she sang solos, played piano, sang in duets with Dick Dale (famously singing Brewer & Shipley's "One Toke Over the Line") and in trios; first with Sandi Griffiths, and Mary Lou Metzger and later for "Gail, Ron & Michael" a mixed trio that featured her husband Ron Anderson and Michael Redman. In addition, she also developed as a songwriter, writing vocal arrangements for both trio groups. Her exposure on The Lawrence Welk Show opened doors in her career, making notable television appearances on Match Game, Dinah!, and The Mike Douglas Show.

The Welk show ended in 1982. In October 1982, Farrell sang in Eureka Springs, Arkansas. The Lieutenant Governor of Oklahoma christened Gail Farrell Drive in her honor in her hometown of Durant. Since then, Farrell has continued to pursue singing/songwriting, as her arrangements have been covered by artists such as Barbara Mandrell and featured on the soap opera Knots Landing. Part of Gail Farrell Drive was re-zoned in July 1994. She sang with numerous recording artists and her vocals have appeared in numerous commercials and television/film soundtracks. Most recently, she appeared on several Welk-related television specials for PBS such as Milestones & Memories and Lawrence Welk, Precious Memories. She reunited with fellow Welk castmates Ava Barber, Ralna English and Mary Lou Metzger for the four-woman revue, Four Wunnerful Women. She also had a voice role in the animated Disney feature The Little Mermaid.

== Personal life ==
Farrell married Ron Anderson on December 7, 1979; they lived in Hendersonville, Tennessee, and had twin daughters, Erin and Lauren (born in September 1982). She was previously married to Rick Mallory and Bob Lawson.

Ron Anderson died on January 26, 2024, at the age of 78.
