= Arthur Duncan =

American tap dancer (1925–2023)

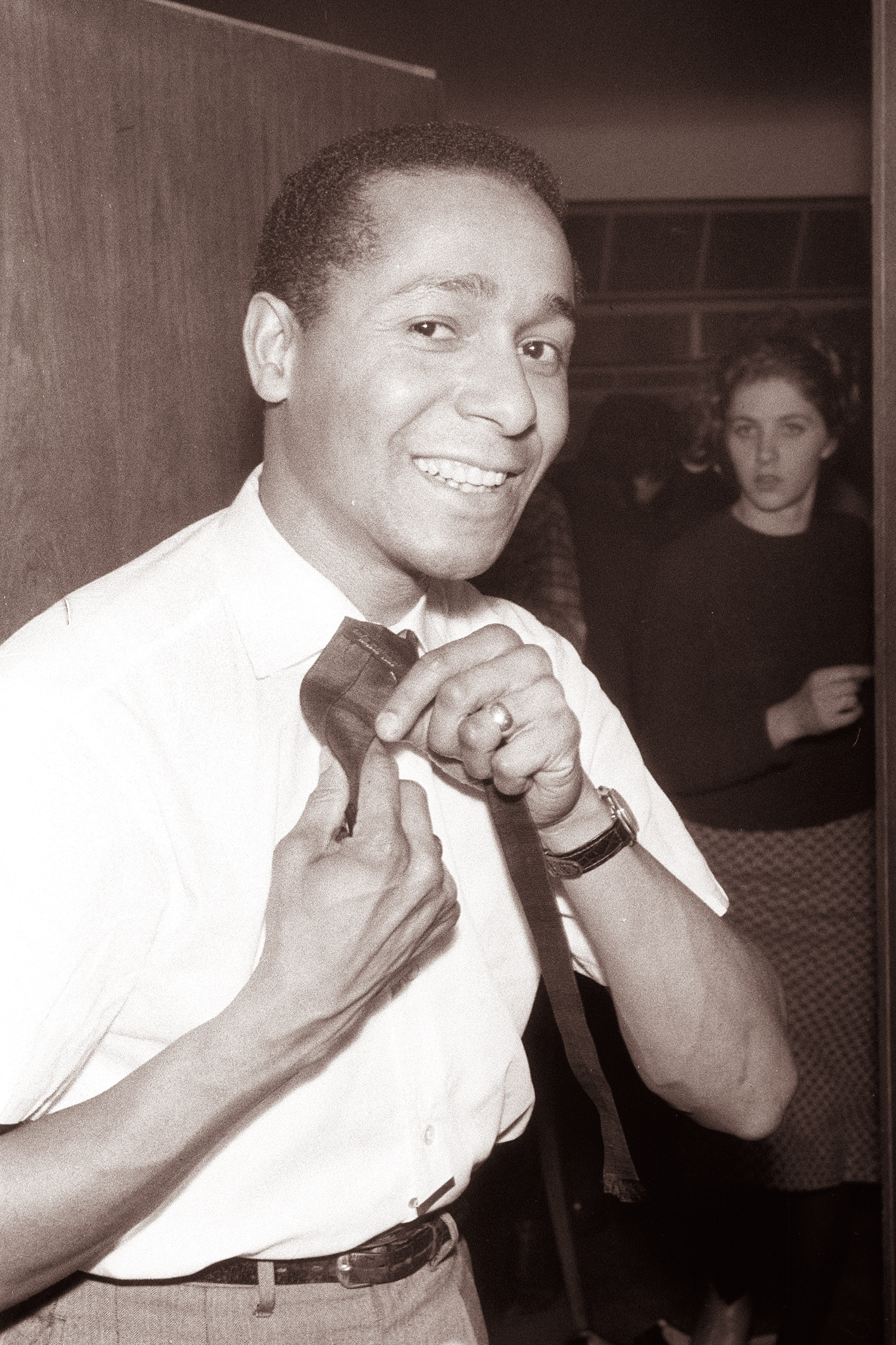
- Duncan in 1962
- Born: September 25, 1925; Pasadena, California, U.S.
- Died: January 4, 2023 (aged 97); Moreno Valley, California, U.S.
- Occupations: Tap dancer, entertainer
- Years active: 1946–2022

Arthur Chester Duncan (September 25, 1925 – January 4, 2023) was an American tap dancer, also called an "Entertainer's Entertainer," known for his stint as a performer on The Lawrence Welk Show from 1964 to 1982. This, along with his earlier inclusion (despite objections) on The Betty White Show in 1954 and with the help of White herself, made him the first African-American regular on a variety television program. He performed all over the world, and notably at Lincoln Center and Carnegie Hall.

== Early life ==
Born in Pasadena, California, one of thirteen children, Duncan entered show business at age thirteen, when he was a member of a dance quartet that performed at McKinley Junior High School in Pasadena. He later entered Pasadena City College to study pharmacy.

== Career ==
Arthur Duncan took dance lessons with Willie Covan and Nick Castle. Duncan claimed that Castle had a bigger influence on him and his musicality. While Duncan could be counted on for a consistent solid rhythm and big finish, he rarely repeated himself and "was not a relaxed dancer." In fact, "his forearms tended to swing stiffly from the elbow."

In terms of expression, he aimed to "please old-timers." The stress of doing so caused the look on his face to be strained, "wavering between smarmy and scared, the smile of a man concerned about the pistol sticking into his back."

In 1954, Duncan first appeared on The Betty White Show and quickly became a regular performer. However, when Betty White's show reached a national audience, television stations in the Jim Crow South threatened a boycott if Duncan remained on the show. In a 2018 interview, White said that she refused to fire Duncan and gave him more airtime, recounting "I said, 'I'm sorry, but, you know, he stays. Live with it'."

In 2018, Duncan had the opportunity to reunite with White on Steve Harvey’s show Little Big Shots: Forever Young where he revealed he was not aware of the controversy at the time of its occurrence. There, he credited White to his success and starting his career.

In 1957, Duncan joined Bob Hope's troupe touring U.S. military bases as a part of the United Service Organization (USO), making him the first African American to be part of that 100-member group. The tour entertained U.S. troops during the Cold War and Vietnam War, providing a moment of relief for those on the battlefront. The tap dancer said it was "the best thing I could have done to help my country."

After his time on The Betty White Show and with USO, Duncan was discovered by Lawrence Welk's personal manager Sam Lutz. He first appeared on the show as a guest in 1964.

Several years after joining The Lawrence Welk Show, Duncan sang and danced a blend of old and new routines at the International Frolics in Los Angeles in 1967. This event took place in the Creole Lounge of the Hacienda International Hotel.

Duncan also kicked off the opening of the new Richmond office of Home Savings and Loan Association on May 3, 1979, in California. Duncan appeared alongside seven others of "TV’s greatest entertainers" in a "salute to the 'golden days of television.'" The seven others consisted of Dennis Day, Alan Hale Jr., David Nelson, Peggy Lennon, and Barbara Hale and her husband, Bill Williams.

In the 1980s, Duncan danced at multiple venues alongside other famous tap dancers. On May 13, 1982, he appeared with the Hoofers Club on the show "Two on the Town." In 1988, he was featured in "An Evening of Tap" at Lincoln Center’s Avery Fisher Hall. Declared a "tap dancer's summit," the event's jazz tap performance included Steve Condos, Howard Sandman Sims, Savion Glover, Bunny Briggs, Jimmy Slyde, and Gregory Hines. Arthur Duncan danced with Gregory Hines a second time that year on September 18 at Carnegie Hall.

Duncan even starred in a musical on top of his many performances. In 1988, around March 10 through 13, he played Mr. Magix in the Long Beach Civic Light Opera's "My One and Only" a musical parody that first opened on Broadway in 1983 and won three Tony Awards. A year later, Duncan performed at San Francisco's Kimball's East, alongside Robert L. Reed. The event also featured Brenda Bufalino, Fred Moritel, Rusty Frank, and Savion Glover.

Duncan's career was not diminished in the turn of the century. In 2004, he danced at the second annual Los Angeles Tap Festival. He continued to dance in the festival every year until 2008.

== The Lawrence Welk Show (1964–1982) ==
Duncan is most famously known for his time on The Lawrence Welk Show, on which he appeared as a regular from 1964 until 1982. Introduced by Welk, the dancer was said to be "a credit to his race and to the entertainment profession."

His time on The Lawrence Welk Show gave the art of tap "its most regular exposure in that era", which was a time in which tap was mostly dormant. It especially helped that he was featured weekly as a regular. Though he tapped alone for the most part, he danced with both Bobby Burgess and Jack Imel on the show.

== Later years ==
The 1989 film Tap featured Duncan in a cameo appearance with other famous tap dancers. He made more TV guest appearances on Diagnosis Murder with Dick Van Dyke, Columbo with Peter Falk, and The Phil Donahue Show.

In 2004 Duncan was honored at the annual "Tap Extravaganza" in New York City.

In 2006, Duncan was honored for his contributions to tap dance at the 15th Annual St. Louis Tap Festival.

In 2017, Duncan appeared on the series premiere episode of the reality talent series Little Big Shots: Forever Young, where he performed a dance and reunited with actress Betty White.

In 2018, Duncan made an appearance on The Talk as part of a surprise for co-host Sheryl Underwood, who performed a tap dance routine with Savion Glover as part of the show's New Year's Evolution. Underwood said Duncan was her inspiration for tap dancing. Duncan gave Underwood flowers to celebrate her return to tap dancing.

== Personal life and death ==
Little is known about Duncan's personal life, but at one point in his life, Duncan served in the U.S. Army as a private, while one of his brothers, Wilbur, was in the U.S. Navy. The two seemed close to their father James Duncan and one of their sisters, Savaletta D. Gordon.

Duncan died of a stroke and pneumonia in Moreno Valley, California, on January 4, 2023, at the age of 97. Upon his death, it was revealed that Duncan was in fact born in 1925. Most biographies during his lifetime had used the birth year of 1933, a mistake which he never corrected, since "he never wanted to discuss anything personal," according to his wife.

== Awards ==
Due to his long-lasting tap dancing career, Duncan has earned many awards and recognition. In 2003, Duncan was featured on the Jerry Lewis Muscular Dystrophy Association Telethon, where he represented "the eldest of three generations of tap". The number danced was choreographed by Jason Samuels Smith and received an Emmy Award.

A year later, in 2004, he won the Flo-Bert Lifetime Achievement Award at the New York City Tap Extravaganza. He then received the Living Treasure in American Dance Award in 2005 from Oklahoma City University. In 2006, he was honored at the 15th Annual St. Louis Tap Festival for his "lifetime contribution to the art of tap dance", earning a tribute.

In 2008, he was presented with an honorary Doctor of Performing Arts in American Dance degree also from Oklahoma City University. Some years later, the Chicago National Association of Dance Masters awarded him the Lifetime Achievement Award in 2011. Lastly, he was inducted in the International Tap Dance Hall of Fame in 2020.
