= Cissy King =

American singer and dancer

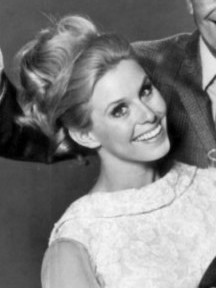
- King in 1969
- Born: January 3, 1946; Trinidad, Colorado
- Occupations: Singer; Dancer

Cissy King is an American-born dancer and choreographer best known as a featured performer on The Lawrence Welk Show television program. Her dance team partner on the series was Bobby Burgess.

== Early life ==
King was born in Trinidad, Colorado. Her father was a geologist employed by an oil company. The family relocated to Albuquerque, New Mexico when Cissy was three.

== Dance career ==
An accomplished dancer since she was a toddler, King — along with her brother John — won first place at the National Ballroom Dancing Championships in San Francisco, California, when she was 14. They captured first place two more times and were also named U.S Ballroom Couple of the Year.

Later, when attending the University of New Mexico, she majored in recreation and physical education and was a cheerleader, gymnast, and was on the synchronized swimming team. She continued to dance in various ballroom competitions and on stage, such as the Six Flags Over Texas campus revue.

=== The Lawrence Welk Show ===
In 1967, King became Bobby Burgess's dance partner on The Lawrence Welk Show when his first partner, Barbara Boylan, left to get married. For the next dozen years, she became one of the most popular performers on the show. In 1974, she was honored with the Dance Masters of America award for outstanding contributions to the field of dance.

== Later career ==
After leaving the show in late 1978, she continued to perform. She appeared for several years with her own solo act "Two Fellows"; and acted in the Broadway touring production of Always Patsy.

Today, King lives in Albuquerque, where she continues to dance and is actively involved in creating new shows for major venues across her home state.
