= Ron Anderson (singer) =

American singer (1945–2024)

Ronald David Anderson (October 18, 1945 – January 26, 2024) was an American singer who appeared on The Lawrence Welk Show for the last two years of its run as a member of the singing trio of Gail, Ron and Michael.

Born in San Francisco, California, after college Anderson served as a choir director before moving to Hollywood to work as a musician. He started out in a gospel brass quartet and later as a stand-in actor for game show hosts during rehearsal. Later, he secured bit acting parts that led to other acting jobs and appearances on The Mary Tyler Moore Show, The Young and the Restless, and The Tonight Show.

He first met Welk star Gail Farrell at an actors' workshop in 1977, and they were married two years later. He joined Gail on the Welk show in 1980, along with Michael Redman, as part of the new singing trio Gail, Ron and Michael.

From a prior marriage, Anderson is the father of two sons: Grant, a television producer, and Jonathan. He has two daughters, Lauren and Erin, with his wife Gail. They live in Northern California and have also lived in Hendersonville, Tennessee. Anderson died on January 26, 2024, at the age of 78.
