= Barney Liddell =

American trombonist (1921–2003)

Barney Liddell (August 13, 1921 – May 5, 2003) was an American big band musician from television's The Lawrence Welk Show, his instrument was the trombone.

Trombonist Barney Liddell

== Early life ==
Born and raised in Gary, Indiana, Liddell was the oldest of eleven children.

=== Education ===
When he entered Horace Mann High School, he was eager to study music and play the saxophone for the school band but they were out of saxes. His second choice was the trumpet, they too were out, so eventually he settled on the trombone and began to practice hard on that instrument, like his idol Tommy Dorsey.

After graduating from high school in 1939, he attended the University of Notre Dame and spent three semesters at the University of Chicago studying engineering.

=== Military ===
Liddell entered the army where for the next two years he was a bugler and a radio operator. Liddell was discharged from the army in 1945.

== Career ==
After being discharged from the United States Army, Liddell went to New York City to get his musician's union card and spent the next few years playing in various bands for bandleaders such as Buddy Williams, Les Elgart, Red Allen, Glen Gray and his Casa Loma Orchestra and finally Elliot Lawrence before eventually joining Lawrence Welk in 1948.

From 1948 until 1982, Barney was an integral part of the Lawrence Welk Orchestra not only as first trombonist, but was also in charge of the band's luggage when the Music Makers went out on concert tours. He first joined the band back when they played regularly at the Aragon Ballroom in Chicago, and made the move to Southern California in 1951 when Welk moved his organization out there on a permanent basis. That same year the Music Makers made their television debut on KTLA in Los Angeles and later made the transition to a nationwide audience on the ABC network in 1955 followed by syndication in 1971.

Even after the show ended in 1982, Barney continued to work for the next twenty plus years, free-lanced on many incarnations of the Welk band, performed with many members of the Musical Family and regularly contracted bands for his own engagements and others. He was also a member of the Big Band Alumni Association for several years.

== Post career ==
Barney Liddell died on May 5, 2003, in the Los Angeles suburb of Westlake Village from kidney and liver failure. He is survived by his wife, Elaine Liddell of Livonia, Michigan.
