= Bob Havens =

American big band and jazz musician (born 1930)

- Born: Robert Havens; May 3, 1930 (age 95); Quincy, Illinois, U.S.
- Genres: Jazz, big band
- Instruments: Trombone

Robert Havens (born May 3, 1930) is an American big band and jazz musician who appeared on The Lawrence Welk Show from 1960 to 1982. His instrument is the trombone.

== Early life ==
Born to a musical family in Quincy, Illinois, he began studying violin and trombone at age seven and played both instruments throughout his school years. He landed his first professional job with a local dance band at age 12. He attended a summer program at the Interlochen Center for the Arts in Interlochen, Michigan. He held the first trombone chair in the school's 250-piece concert band. He later held the first trombone chair in the Quincy Symphony while also playing in many popular dance groups in Illinois.

== Career ==
After serving in the Illinois National Guard as a bandsman during the Korean War, he left Quincy in 1955 to tour with the Ralph Flanagan Orchestra. In 1956, he joined George Girard's Dixieland Band at the Famous Door in New Orleans. There, he met his idol, Jack Teagarden.

In 1957, Havens joined Al Hirt at Dan's Pier 600 on Bourbon Street when Hirt formed his first band. The front line consisted of Hirt, Havens and Pete Fountain. During the time in New Orleans, he recorded albums for Good Times Jazz and Vic labels with the Girard band, and on Verve and Audio Fidelity with Hirt. He also recorded about a dozen albums for the Southland label with many other New Orleans musicians.

He stayed with this group until 1960, when he was persuaded to move to the West Coast and join the Lawrence Welk Orchestra, as a featured soloist on their weekly TV series. His tenure with this show lasted for 23 years until the show ended in 1982.

Following that, he continued as a freelance professional, working often with the Bob Crosby Bob Cats, and the Benny Goodman Orchestra (led by clarinetist Peanuts Hucko). From 1985 to 1995, Havens played with the Great Pacific Jazz Band along with Bob Ringwald (lead vocals/piano), Don Nelson (saxophone), and Zeke Zarchy (trumpet).

In 2005, he performed with the North Carolina Pops Orchestra at Campbell University, with fellow Welk star Ava Barber, in a benefit concert raising money for victims of Hurricane Katrina.

== Personal life ==
Havens lives in Quincy, Illinois. He continues to record and appear at jazz festivals and concerts throughout the world.
