= Steve Smith (American singer) =

American singer best known from The Lawrence Welk Show (born 1945)

Steve Smith (born May 30, 1945) is an American singer best known from television's The Lawrence Welk Show.

== Biography ==
Born and reared in San Francisco, California; he graduated from San Lorenzo High School and attended the Christian Westmont College in Santa Barbara, California, where he met fellow Westmont students Bob Duncan, Greg Dixon, and Johnny Johnson. The foursome sang all over campus as a quartet, which in 1965 drew the attention of bandleader Lawrence Welk. They were at the Hollywood Palladium watching Welk's music makers perform when they got the chance to audition for Welk.

The Blenders, with Smith singing lead, joined the show later that year and were a popular fixture of the Musical Family until they broke up in 1967.

Smith stayed on as a featured vocalist and, in addition to solo numbers, sang both as a part of a barber shop quartet and as lead vocals in the Curt Ramsey Quintet. Smith also did multiple duets with the Lennon Sisters primarily with Kathy Lennon on the show. On October 8, 1966, in a Welk musical tour of Italy, Smith sang "Three Coins in the Fountain".

He left the show in 1969 to pursue a solo career of his own, which included stints on The Carol Burnett Show and as part of 1950s-style group The Diamonds.

In 1979, Smith was one of the six backup singers on Ethel Merman's cult classic The Ethel Merman Disco Album.

Today, Smith and his wife Hope live in the Lake Tahoe valley of California and Nevada, where they operate a ski resort while he still pursues singing.
