= Aladdin (performer) =

Actor and musician (1912–1970)

Aladdin Abdullah Achmed Anthony Pallante (September 12, 1912 – June 9, 1970) was an actor and musician better known to fans as Aladdin who appeared on The Lawrence Welk Show from 1955 to 1967.

Born and raised in New York, Aladdin first began his professional career as a dancer at age three, but a serious fall, which left him temporarily paralyzed, forced him to turn his talents in an instrumental and vocal direction, which led him to learning to play the violin.

Prior to joining Welk's Champagne Music Makers, he appeared with Ray Noble on the Edgar Bergen Show and has appeared in several Hollywood movies both as an actor and musician. Among his film roles were, The Girl in the Red Velvet Swing, Easy to Love, Deep in the Heart of Texas, and Gentlemen Prefer Blondes. He was also a featured violinist for Rudy Vallee, Xavier Cugat, and Carmen Cavallaro.

He joined the Welk orchestra in 1953. Known informally among the band members as Tony Pallante, he took the stage name Aladdin. In addition to his talents as an expressive violinist, he displayed a flair for comedy and appeared in the show's novelty numbers, sometimes using dialects and often duetting with another singer-violinist, Bob Lido. He was also well received by audiences for his dramatic readings, most of them submitted by Helen Steiner Rice of Cincinnati, Ohio.

Aladdin was known to speak several different languages, which included Spanish, French, Russian, Yiddish and Hebrew. He recorded the song "Darktown Strutters Ball" for Welk in Italian on the Coral record label with Bob Lido singing in English.

As the honorary mayor of Van Nuys, he was one of 21 honorary mayors to serve in the Honorary Mayors Association of Los Angeles when it formed in 1965.

He left the show after suffering a heart attack in the fall of 1967, and died a few years afterward in 1970.
