= The Lawrence Welk–Hee Haw Counter-Revolution Polka =

Single by Roy Clark

from the album Roy Clark Live!
- B-side: "When the Wind Blows in Chicago"
- Released: July 1972
- Recorded: April 1972
- Genre: Country
- Length: 2:39
- Label: Dot Records
- Songwriter: Vaughn Horton
- Producer: Joe Allison

Roy Clark singles chronology
"Ode to a Critter" (1972)	"The Lawrence Welk–Hee Haw Counter-Revolution Polka" (1972)	"Come Live with Me" (1973)

"The Lawrence Welk–Hee Haw Counter-Revolution Polka" is a song made famous by country music singer Roy Clark. Written by Vaughn Horton, the song was released in 1972 as a single to the album Roy Clark Live!. The song was a top 10 hit on the Billboard magazine Hot Country Singles chart that October.

== Context ==
The song is a satirical response to television's rural purge, which saw a series of cancellations of still-popular television shows in the early 1970s (particularly the 1970–71 season), most of which either had or were perceived to have had demographically skewed audiences, in favor of shows that were thought to pull in the more desirable younger demographics, and because a new federal mandate required the networks to surrender much of their prime time to affiliates. The two shows mentioned in the title and throughout the song—Hee Haw, a CBS series on which Clark was a co-host; and The Lawrence Welk Show, which aired on ABC—were among those shows canceled by their networks in 1971 as part of the rural purge; demographics (a rural audience for Hee Haw, an elderly-leaning audience for Lawrence Welk) was the most cited reason. Both Hee Haw and Lawrence Welk were revived that fall through syndication to local stations, and were immediate successes in syndication, both going on to last over a decade longer (Welk retired in 1982, and Hee Haw continued to produce new shows until 1992).

The song suggests that people would rather hear "a-one, a-two, a-three" (Welk's common way of introducing his songs) and/or believe that "Hee Haw's good enough for me" than either accept the new television offerings and/or the reason behind the cancellations.

The phrasing of the revival of the two programs as a "counter-revolution" may be a nod to "The Revolution Will Not Be Televised", a 1970 spoken-word piece that speaks negatively of many of the shows that were canceled (although neither Hee Haw nor The Lawrence Welk Show were expressly mentioned) and speaks of a revolution that will make said shows "no longer be so damned relevant," presaging the eventual rural purge.

== Chart performance ==
Chart (1972)	Peak position
U.S. Billboard Hot Country Singles	9
Canadian RPM Country Tracks	4
