= Jimmy Roberts (singer) =

Background information
- Born: James Robert Heltsley; April 6, 1923; Madisonville, Kentucky, U.S.
- Died: February 6, 1999 (aged 75) Clearwater, Florida, U.S.
- Occupation: Singer
- Instrument: Vocals
- Website: Jimmy Roberts

Jimmy Roberts (April 6, 1923 – February 6, 1999) was an American tenor singer. He was a featured performer on the TV variety program The Lawrence Welk Show during its entire broadcast run from 1955 to 1982.

Born in Madisonville, Kentucky, he was serving in the United States Army after World War II when he was hit with the "show business" bug. He first sang in public during a military play while the sets were being changed and, upon his discharge from the Army, set out for Hollywood to learn his craft at the Herbert Wall Music School. In 1954, he was hired by Lawrence Welk as a soloist when Welk's orchestra performed on local television station KTLA and at the Aragon Ballroom in Santa Monica, California. A year later, when the Lawrence Welk orchestra made the move to national television on ABC, Roberts' natural singing talents made him nationally famous.

During his tenure on the show, his signature numbers such as "I Left My Heart in San Francisco" and "My Old Kentucky Home" made him an audience favorite, especially among the show's female fans. He also sang duets with the show's Champagne Lady Norma Zimmer.

Although he receded from the national spotlight by the late 1970s, Roberts continued to perform and tour until the early 1990s. From 1983 to 1987, he worked with a talent outfit entitled "Young American Stars of Tomorrow." His piano accompanist was well-known recording artist and educator Steve Whipkey (who was in his teens). Promoter/percussionist Jay Van Hall was the host of the program, and the outfit achieved modest financial and commercial success in the Tampa Bay area, where Roberts lived.

Roberts was the father of two sons, Gary and Steven, from his first marriage with Jane. He and his second wife, Vi, were married from 1985 until his death in Clearwater, Florida from bone cancer in 1999, just two months before his 76th birthday.
