= Bobby Burgess =

American dancer and singer (born 1941)

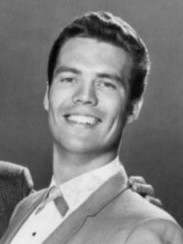
- Burgess in 1969
- Born: Robert Wilkie Burgess; May 19, 1941 (age 85); Long Beach, California, U.S.
- Occupations: Singer, dancer
- Spouse: Kristie Floren (m. 1971)
- Children: 4

Robert Wilkie Burgess (born May 19, 1941) is an American dancer and singer. He was one of the original Mouseketeers. Later, he was a regular on The Lawrence Welk Show.

== Early life ==
Growing up in Southern California, Burgess started performing at age five, which included dancing, singing and playing the accordion. At the age of 13, in 1955, he was selected as one of the original Mouseketeers by Walt Disney to appear on his new ABC television series, The Mickey Mouse Club, giving young Burgess his first taste of celebrity. He also guest starred on The Donna Reed Show as a suitor of Mary Stone (Shelley Fabares). Burgess attended Southern California Military Academy in Long Beach for his elementary and junior high school. By the time Burgess turned 11, he had appeared in at least 75 television programs.

== After Disney ==
When the series ended in 1959, Burgess returned to a normal teenager's life, and graduated from Long Beach Polytechnic High School. He then began attending Long Beach State University where he became a member of Sigma Pi fraternity. While there, he and his childhood friend (and dancing partner) Barbara Boylan entered a Calcutta dance contest held by Lawrence Welk and his orchestra based on the hit song of the same name. They won the contest and first prize was an appearance on The Lawrence Welk Show, which appeared on ABC.

After their initial appearance, Burgess and Boylan continued to guest on Welk's show for the next few weeks, either dancing to Calcutta or to the orchestra's next hit song Yellow Bird. The positive fan response led to Welk hiring the dance couple as permanent members of the show, which was described by the bandleader as having created a job for themselves. Over the course of the show's run, first on ABC and later in syndication; Burgess had three dance partners: Barbara Boylan from 1961 to 1967, who was also a temporary fill-in for a few shows in 1979, Cissy King (1967–78), and Elaine Balden (1979–82). He did song-and-dance numbers with Arthur Duncan and Jack Imel and co-hosted, with Mary Lou Metzger, wraparound segments on The Lawrence Welk Show's PBS reruns in 2010.

== Later life ==
Burgess still dances when he is touring with Elaine Balden, and at his own dance studio, where he instructs young students.

== Personal life ==
Burgess married Kristie Floren, the daughter of Welk accordionist Myron Floren, on Valentine's Day (February 14, 1971). The couple live in Hollywood Hills and are parents to four children.
