= Rural purge =

1970s mass sitcom cancellations

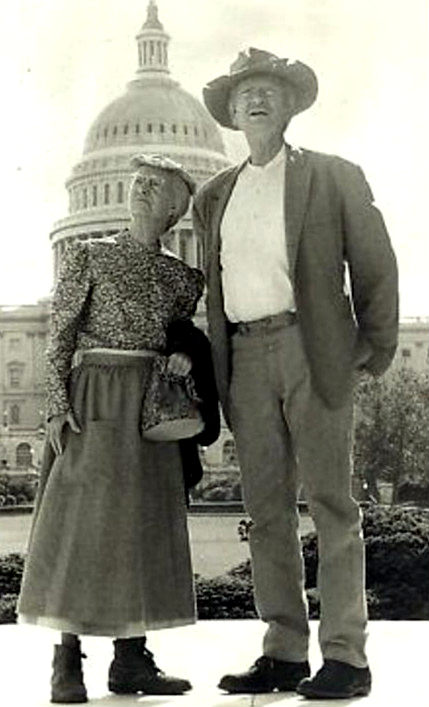
Irene Ryan and Buddy Ebsen as Granny and Jed Clampett in the last season of The Beverly Hillbillies

The rural purge was the mass cancellation of rural-themed television programs by American networks, in particular CBS, that occurred in the early 1970s. The term was coined within the entertainment industry, although its exact source is unclear.

The majority of these cancellations occurred at the end of the 1970–71 television season. In addition to rural-themed shows such as Mayberry R.F.D., The Beverly Hillbillies, Petticoat Junction, Green Acres, and Hee Haw, the cancellations ended several highly rated variety shows that had been on CBS since the beginning of television broadcasting. CBS saw a dramatic change in direction with the shift, moving away from shows with rural themes and toward more appeal to urban and suburban audiences.

== Background ==
=== Early television and anti-communist campaigns ===
Programming in American television during the late 1940s and early 1950s was "as culturally diverse ... as [had] ever existed", according to the media historian Sara K. Eskridge. Numerous programs about ethnic minorities and topical subjects achieved success; some had already been successful as radio programs. This programming was partially attributable to network infrastructure, Federal Communications Commission (FCC) regulations of the period, and the expense of purchasing a television set. As a result, the early dissemination of television was primarily an urban phenomenon; most televisions in 1950 had been purchased within a 75-mile radius of New York City, Los Angeles, Boston, and other large cities.

This trend in programming ended because of the increased public mistrust of the entertainment industry that followed the Second Red Scare. Negative perceptions of the industry worsened with the 1950 publication of Red Channels, which listed 151 people accused of subversive activities. Among those listed was the actress Jean Muir, one of the stars of the sitcom The Aldrich Family. NBC and General Foods, the show's sponsor, were successfully prevailed upon by viewers to fire Muir in August. Anti-communist boycotts and threats from the FCC profoundly changed the television industry within a year of the publication of Red Channels; programming shifts away from featuring ethnic minorities and discussions of topical subjects were further encouraged by the National Association of Radio and Television Broadcasters in 1956. By the late 1950s, television networks effectively censored their own content without need of external organizations or public pressure and were producing programming that was markedly different from what they had produced at the beginning of the decade.

=== Rise of the rural sitcom ===
The most widely viewed genres of programming on television during the late 1950s were Westerns, mysteries, game shows, and variety shows. They appealed to a broad viewership for various reasons, while their lack of potential controversy made these genres attractive to networks. The revelation that the outcomes on the show Twenty-One were scripted led to the era's quiz show scandals. The success in 1955 of Davy Crockett on ABC made Westerns increasingly appealing over other genres to networks. They also were widely enjoyed by the rapidly expanding viewership in rural areas and the American South; urban-themed programming, as a result, diminished in general favor. The Western was the dominant genre in television in 1959 and the early 1960s. Interest in country music and rural-themed programming increased in urban markets as well.

ABC, which typically ranked third in ratings, was motivated to experiment with its programming; it sought to create a rural-themed sitcom that would be acceptable to families. This eventually resulted in The Real McCoys, starring Walter Brennan, which was broadcast from 1957 to 1962. Throughout its run on ABC the show was ranked among the top ten most-watched, according to ratings compiled by Nielsen Media Research.

CBS and NBC consequently began to develop their own sitcoms with rural and Southern themes. The popularity of such programs led Groucho Marx (whose own show You Bet Your Life was among the casualties of this shift in programming) to remark that "the air is now completely filled with cowboys, fertilizer, and inanity". Each subsequent new rural-themed sitcom from the major networks increasingly turned away from Western motifs and, instead, incorporated Southern ones. In late 1960, CBS aired The Andy Griffith Show, which was the most successful rural-themed sitcom to date. Eskridge observed that with its popular reception, CBS "not only took the lead in creating pure rural comedy, it also perfected the art of marketing such series":

In rural comedy, [CBS] discovered a form of programming that provided pure escapism, that neither cast aspersions upon the network's patriotism, nor subjected it to scandal, yet still appealed to large numbers of people.

In 1962, CBS debuted The Beverly Hillbillies, which Eskridge described as "arguably the most popular television program of all time". Its creator, Paul Henning, used his childhood experiences in Missouri to explore the social dynamics between urban and rural dwellers. Critics excoriated the show. One critic in The Saturday Evening Post, who referred to the "Vast Wasteland speech" by FCC chairman Newton N. Minow, said that The Beverly Hillbillies proved that the "wasteland was really a cornfield." Nevertheless, the show's popularity continued despite poor reviews, a phenomenon that became a widely discussed subject in the press. CBS, which led the ratings for much of the 1960s, also ignored critics. It commissioned spin-offs of both The Andy Griffith Show and The Beverly Hillbillies. These, too, repeated the dichotomous receptions of viewers and critics.

=== Decline ===
By 1966, industry executives were lamenting the lack of diversity in American television offerings and the dominance of rural-oriented programming on the Big Three television networks of the era, noting that "ratings indicate that the American public prefer hillbillies, cowboys, and spies".

CBS vice president Michael Dann personally hated the rural-oriented programming that he was airing (as did most television executives), but he kept the shows on the air in acknowledgement of their strong overall ratings, which he considered the most important measure of a program's success. Dann's superior, CBS president James T. Aubrey, likewise believed rural sitcoms were a crucial part of the network's formula for success, noting that, at the time, advertisers wanted the audience that watched rural sitcoms.

A preliminary wave of cuts occurred in 1967, motivated by viewer demographics, when CBS ordered cancellation of its remaining game shows, Password, What's My Line?, I've Got a Secret, and To Tell the Truth (though the last continued in daytime for another year). These programs were still extremely profitable, mainly because of their low budgets, and would all be revived within a few years, but failed to attract audiences in target demographics, young adult and urban. The network attempted to incorporate more urban programming, including the innovative sitcom He & She in the 1967 season, but a clash with that show's lead-in (Green Acres) led to its cancellation. The Smothers Brothers Comedy Hour, likewise an innovative and far more successful program that appealed to a younger audience, also debuted in 1967.

== Instigation ==
As summarized for the Museum of Broadcast Communications:

By the late 1960s, … many viewers, especially young ones, were rejecting [rural-themed] shows as irrelevant to modern times. Mayberry's total isolation from contemporary problems was part of its appeal, but more than a decade of media coverage of the civil rights movement had brought about a change in the popular image of the small Southern town. Gomer Pyle, U.S.M.C., was set on a U.S. Marine base between 1964 and 1969, but neither Gomer nor any of his fellow Marines ever mentioned the war in Vietnam. CBS executives, afraid of losing the lucrative youth demographic, purged their schedule of hit shows that were drawing huge but older-skewing audiences.

The wave of cancellations was instigated by CBS executive Robert Wood, the incoming president of CBS, who pressured longtime CBS programming head Michael Dann to cancel the rural programs. Dann responded: "Just because the people who buy refrigerators are between 26 and 35 and live in Scarsdale, you should not beam your programming only at them." Dann was replaced with Fred Silverman, following research highlighting the commercial value of the young adult urban viewer for advertisers. Much of CBS's existing lineup drew audiences that were too old and rural, or children, who lacked purchasing power. Wood's successor James Rosenfield would continue the same strategy..

CBS canceled everything with a tree in it—including Lassie.

— Pat Buttram, "Mr. Haney" from Green Acres

== Popularity of canceled shows ==
Gomer Pyle, U.S.M.C. was the first of the rural-based shows to leave the air, not due to its theme but because of Jim Nabors' desire to "reach for another rung on the ladder, either up or down". He was given a new show, The Jim Nabors Hour, as a replacement for the next season.

Mayberry R.F.D., a direct continuation of The Andy Griffith Show, finished fourth for 1969 and was renewed for two more seasons, but it slipped in the ratings to fifteenth by its final season.

The first of the cancellations was The Red Skelton Show, which had finished the 1969–70 season as the number seven show. It had however fallen out of the top 30 by 1971 after its move to NBC.

The success of The Mary Tyler Moore Show, All in the Family, and newer, more urban variety shows such as The Carol Burnett Show in 1967 and The Flip Wilson Show in 1970 (on arch-rival NBC), allowed cancellations of most of the "undesired shows" at the end of 1971, despite their high ratings and popularity. Both Green Acres and The Beverly Hillbillies had dropped from the Nielsen top 30 by the 1970–71 season, yet both shows continued to win their respective time slots and had loyal followings, warranting renewal for another season. Other shows that were still pulling in even higher ratings when they were canceled included Mayberry R.F.D., which finished the season at number 15, Hee Haw at number 16, and The Jim Nabors Hour at number 29.

== Replacement shows ==
Much of the programming canceled by the networks continued as first-run syndicated programming by network affiliate stations. The Prime Time Access Rule had forced the networks to surrender the 7:30 p.m. Eastern fringe time slot back to their affiliates, another impetus for the rural purge. Lassie and Hee Haw almost immediately went into syndication during the fringe time slot, mainly at CBS affiliates. Several other network cast-offs such as ABC's The Lawrence Welk Show and NBC's Wild Kingdom, earned similar extensions through syndication.

For the network time slots, CBS head Fred Silverman replaced much of the canceled programming in 1971 and 1972 with "relevant" fare. Following the spectacular success of All in the Family, its creator Norman Lear produced its many spinoffs including Maude (debuting 1972) and The Jeffersons (1975). The success of The Mary Tyler Moore Show led MTM Productions to develop the popular The Bob Newhart Show. The sardonic, sophisticated comedy M*A*S*H was added to the network in 1972, placing in the top 10 shows for its final seven of eleven seasons: it eventually aired the most watched single episode of any series in U.S. television history during its 1983 series finale.

A side effect of the rural purge was the reduction of the laugh track. Most of the rural-oriented programs were filmed in the single-camera setup without a studio audience, but with canned laughter added by laugh-track proprietor Charley Douglass. The newer shows of the early 1970s were multiple-camera setups with live studio audiences, which became the norm throughout the 1970s and continues today, with the laugh track mostly limited to sweetening. This was not possible for M*A*S*H, which was filmed on location, but due to the occasionally serious nature of the material, producers of the military hospital dramedy did not want a laugh track. CBS compromised by excluding the laugh track in certain scenes, including the operating room.

Under Silverman's watch, game shows returned to the network's daytime schedule. (CBS, unlike NBC or ABC, had not carried a daytime game show since To Tell the Truth ended in 1968, instead opting for reruns of 1960s prime-time sitcoms such as The Lucy Show and Gomer Pyle, U.S.M.C., both of which had left the air by that point.) The first of these shows was The Amateur's Guide to Love, which ran for three months in the spring and summer of 1972. Shortly afterward, on September 4, the network debuted three new game shows: The New Price Is Right, Gambit, and The Joker's Wild. Gambit ran until 1976 and returned in 1980 for an additional year as Las Vegas Gambit on NBC; Joker ended its CBS run in 1975, then later ran in syndication from 1977 to 1986; and Price began its 55th season in fall 2026.

Despite the relatively large number of "old guard" variety shows canceled in the purge, Silverman actually continued to create new variety shows to replace the ones he had canceled; one of the first was The Sonny & Cher Comedy Hour, which debuted in August 1971 and would last until Sonny and Cher divorced in 1974. Silverman then retained Cher's services, signing her to her own show Cher in 1975, after which she agreed to reunite professionally with Sonny for another two seasons of their show, before it ended again in 1977. Silverman would commission Donny & Marie for ABC in 1976. He would also, with less success, commission The Brady Bunch Hour for ABC in 1976, Mel and Susan Together for the same network in 1978, and Pink Lady and Jeff for NBC in 1980, all three of which were received poorly. NBC tried a big, splashy 90-minute variety show entitled The Big Show that debuted in March 1980, but it was cancelled after only two months.

Several conservative members of Congress, as well as President Richard Nixon and members of his administration, expressed displeasure at some of the replacement shows, many of which (especially the more socially conscious shows such as All in the Family) were not particularly "family-friendly". The backlash from the purge prompted CBS to commission a rural family drama, The Waltons, for its fall 1972 schedule based on the TV film The Homecoming: A Christmas Story (1971). The network scheduled it in what it thought would be a death slot against popular series The Flip Wilson Show and The Mod Squad, allegedly hoping the show would underperform and head to a quick cancellation. Instead, the show proved to be an instant hit, prompting CBS to change course and put its full support behind the show; The Waltons went on to run for nine seasons, reaching as high as second in the Nielsens and finishing in the top 30 for seven of its nine years on air; it would become a perennial fixture in syndicated reruns for decades thereafter. The success of The Waltons started a trend for family dramas throughout the 1970s, such as Little House on the Prairie, Apple's Way, Family, and Eight Is Enough.

For four decades after the purge, few sitcoms of note were set in the South, and many of those were set in urban or suburban communities. One media critic stated that only four of note had been made—House of Payne, Meet the Browns (both from Atlanta-based Tyler Perry), Designing Women and The Carmichael Show. Of these, the first three are set in Atlanta or its metropolitan area, and the fourth is set in Charlotte. Other examples include Evening Shade, a Burt Reynolds vehicle set in a fictionalized version of Evening Shade, Arkansas; The Golden Girls, set in Miami, Florida, and featuring the identifiably Southern Blanche Devereaux and rural Rose Nylund as main characters; Mama's Family, set in a Southernized version of Raytown, Missouri, and featuring Mayberry RFD star Ken Berry in a major supporting role; and the animated sitcom King of the Hill, which ran for 13 seasons on the Fox network and featured a caricature of suburban Texas life.

== Related cancellations ==
Non-rural-themed shows canceled by CBS included sitcoms Family Affair and Hogan's Heroes in 1971, with the long-running My Three Sons ending in 1972. Variety shows that had been around since the late 1940s and early 1950s, such as The Jackie Gleason Show and The Ed Sullivan Show, were canceled in 1970 and 1971, respectively; likewise, The Original Amateur Hour (a stalwart of network television since its debut, and before that on radio since 1934) ended on its own accord in 1970 due to the show's aging demographics. The Red Skelton Show was canceled by CBS at the end of the 1969–70 season and was picked up by NBC (the series's original network) for one more season. NBC also reverted Skelton's show to its original half-hour format in place of its more familiar hour-long format on CBS. By the end of 1972, Lucille Ball remained the only long-time star from television's golden era to still have her own show. Ball's show, Here's Lucy, still rated in the Nielsen top ten and continued to pull in high ratings until its end in 1974.

Westerns were another genre targeted for cancellation. Martial artist Bruce Lee, in attempting to pitch his series The Warrior to television networks, stated he was told that "the Western idea is out." However, by 1972, ABC produced a new Western series based on Lee's idea called Kung Fu, but cast white actor David Carradine in the lead. Apart from Gunsmoke and Bonanza, two prime-time staples which in 1971 had been on the air for a combined 28 years (and continued to air until 1975 and 1973, respectively), most of the shows in the genre were already off the air at the time of the purge. NBC canceled two of the remaining Westerns in 1971, The Virginian and The High Chaparral. The 1971 plan of CBS included cancellation of Gunsmoke at the end of the 1970–71 season, while Mayberry R.F.D. and Family Affair were renewed for the 1971–72 season; Fred Silverman and Robert Wood both favored cancelling Gunsmoke over Mayberry R.F.D. and Family Affair. This was revised due to Gunsmoke's Top-10 ratings, ranking #5 in the Nielsen Ratings for the 1970–71 season, rising to number 4 in the 1971–72 season. Another factor was that Gunsmoke was the favorite TV program of Barbara Paley, wife of CBS Chief Executive William Paley. Westerns had already been targeted by parents' groups opposing television violence, and by those concerned about portrayals of Native Americans. The genre's popularity was also fading in the face of overexposure; following a boom in the format's popularity in the 1960s, the last new traditional television Westerns debuted in 1968.

ABC seriously considered picking up Family Affair for its 1971–72 primetime schedule to join its Friday night lineup alongside two other shows with similar audiences (The Brady Bunch and The Partridge Family), but concluded that Family Affair had run its course.

== See also ==
- "The Lawrence Welk-Hee Haw Counter-Revolution Polka"
