= Ranwood Records =

American record label

- Parent company: Welk Music Group
- Founded: 1968
- Founder: Randy Wood, Lawrence Welk
- Distributor: Universal Music Group
- Genre: Big band, easy listening, jazz, polka, country, pop
- Country of origin: U.S.

Ranwood Records is an American record label started in 1968 by Randy Wood (after he left Dot Records) and Lawrence Welk. Lawrence Welk owned all of the recordings that he released on Dot as they were produced and manufactured by Teleklew Productions and leased to Dot. These were repackaged for reissue on Ranwood. Welk did not own or buy those recordings he made for Coral and they continue to be owned by Universal Music.

Most of Welk's later recordings were released on Ranwood. The label released albums by The Lawrence Welk Show's cast members, including Jo Ann Castle, Guy & Ralna, Clay Hart, Tom Netherton, Ava Barber, and Bob Ralston. Welk acquired Wood's interest in the label in 1979. Ranwood's releases were mostly albums and 45 rpm singles.

Musicians who recorded for Ranwood but were unrelated to Welk's TV show included The Mills Brothers, Jim Nabors, Sounds of Sunshine, The Exotic Guitars, The Charles Randolph Grean Sounde and Damita Jo. During the mid-1980s, the label was folded into Welk Music Group, which also acquired Vanguard and Sugar Hill.

In 2015, Welk Music Group sold the Vanguard and Sugar Hill labels to Concord Bicycle Music while retaining ownership of the Ranwood catalog. Welk licensed the Ranwood catalog to Concord Music Group for ten years.

== See also ==
- List of record labels
- Welk Music Group
  - Sugar Hill Records
  - Vanguard Records
