= Jo Ann Castle =

American pianist (1939–2026)

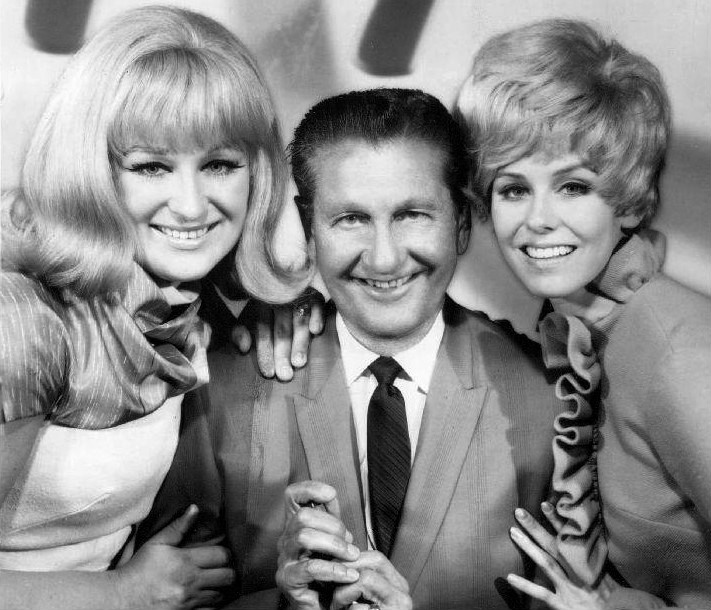
- Castle on the left with Lawrence Welk and Cissy King, 1969

Background information
- Born: Jo Ann Zering; September 3, 1939; Bakersfield, California, U.S.
- Died: May 8, 2026 (aged 86)
- Genres: Honky-tonk; Boogie-woogie; Ragtime
- Occupation: Pianist
- Instruments: Piano; Accordion

Jo Ann Castle (née Zering; September 3, 1939 – May 8, 2026) was an American honky-tonk pianist who appeared on The Lawrence Welk Show. She adopted her stage name from the name of an accordion manufacturer, another instrument she played. She was often referred to as "Queen of the Honky-Tonk Piano" by Lawrence Welk.

== Life and career ==
Jo Ann was born to William George Zering (1904–1987), a railroad brakeman for the Santa Fe Railroad, and Dorothy Leona Easterly (1918–1996), a Harvey Girl, who worked as a hostess at the Bakersfield Harvey House restaurant.

Castle started her career in Bakersfield, California. When she was 3 years old, she began singing, dancing and performing within her local community.

Originally introduced to Welk by Joe Feeney in 1959, Castle became a permanent member of the Welk Family, replacing the departing Big Tiny Little. Shortly after joining the Show, Castle married cameraman Dean Hall. They divorced in 1966 after having a daughter. Castle married again in 1968 and had a son and a daughter. Castle left the Welk Show in 1969 and divorced in 1971. Her third marriage, in 1978, ended in 1986.

In the 1990s, Castle performed at the Welk-owned Champagne Theater in Branson, Missouri, as well as making a guest appearance for a show with Jimmy Sturr and His Orchestra on RFD TV.

On September 3, 2011, Castle married her fourth husband, Lin Biviano, who was a trumpet player from Boston.

Castle died on May 8, 2026, at the age of 86, as announced by several of her Welk co-stars. She had been suffering from chronic pain for several years prior to her death.

== Discography ==
List of albums, with Australian chart positions
Title	Album details	Peak chart positions
Title	Album details	AUS
The Best Little Honky Tonk in Town	Released: September 1983; Format: LP; Label: J&B (JB 149)	30
