= Joe Feeney =

American tenor singer

Joe Feeney (August 15, 1931 – April 16, 2008) was an American tenor singer who was a member of The Lawrence Welk Show television program.

== Early years ==
Born to an Irish-American family in Grand Island, Nebraska, Feeney had two brothers. He started singing as a boy soprano in St. Mary Cathedral, his parish church choir and after graduating from St. Mary's Cathedral High School, he landed a guest appearance on the show Youth Opportunity Hour. His mother Mary supported him in all of his activities.

Feeney studied at St. Benedict College in Atchison, Kansas, and at the University of Nebraska. While he attended to his studies at the University of Nebraska, he entered several singing contests, which included a spot on the Arlene Francis program, Talent Patrol. In 1956, while he was working at radio station WOW in Omaha, the station manager sent recordings of Feeney's voice to the Welk offices in Santa Monica, California where Lawrence Welk offered him a job on his show.

After their second child was born, Feeney had to drop out of the university for financial reasons. He sold children's encyclopedias until the position on the Welk show became available.

== The Lawrence Welk Show ==
From 1957 to 1982, when the Welk show ended production, Feeney was the program's featured Irish tenor. Among his selection of musical numbers that were popular with the Welk audience were Danny Boy, Galway Bay, Sweet Leilani and the Mario Lanza classic Be My Love.

== Other professional activities ==
He also has the distinction of singing for five US Presidents and performed at Carnegie Hall three times; in 1975 he sang for Pope Paul VI at the canonization of Mother Seton, the first native-born American saint.

== Personal life ==
Feeney was the father of ten children with his first wife Georgia Lee Gryva, whom he met and married while they were at the University of Nebraska. Feeney spent his time between his house in Palm Springs California and his vacation home in San Marcos Mexico. His last public performance was in November of 2007. One of his sons, Chris, is an accomplished opera singer in his own right and often sang with his father in concerts.

== Death ==
Feeney, a non-smoker, died of emphysema at a hospice in Carlsbad, California on April 16, 2008. A son, Tim Feeney, said the family suspects he got the illness from years of exposure to second-hand smoke in clubs and casinos. He was survived by sons Joe Jr., George Patrick, Chris, Sean, Timothy, and Matt; daughters Kathy Feeney and Georgia Feeney, and eight grandchildren.
