= Russ Klein =

American business executive

Russell "Russ" Klein is an American business executive. He was the CEO of the American Marketing Association from 2014 to 2021. He has also directed the marketing operations of brands such as Burger King, 7-Eleven, Arby's, and Dr. Pepper/7UP.

== Education ==
Klein attended The Ohio State University Fisher College of Business and graduated in 1979 with a degree in business administration. He later graduated from the Harvard Business School Advanced Management Program in 1998. Klein is a recipient of Ohio State University's Fisher College of Business Distinguished Alumnus Award.

== Career ==
After graduation, Klein was hired by Liggett Stashower, a Cleveland-based advertising agency. He went on to join advertising companies Leo Burnett and Foote, Cone & Belding, where he supervised accounts including United Airlines, Gatorade, MaytagKimberly-Clark, and McDonald’s.

In 1987, Klein was named head of marketing for Seven-Up USA at age 29. He helped develop and introduce Cherry 7UP.

In 2002, Klein became Chief Marketing Officer at 7-Eleven before joining Burger King the following year.

At Burger King, Klein served as President of Global Marketing, Strategy, and Innovation. Under Klein's leadership, the company was named by Adweek as “The Advertiser of the Decade” for the 2000s. Klein also oversaw the development of Burger King's "Subservient Chicken" campaign, which was recognized by several publications including The New York Times, The One Show, and The Wall Street Journal as one of the best ads of the 2000s.

Klein was also responsible for Burger King's "Whopper Freakout" advertising campaign, which won a Grand Effie, the top award for marketing effectiveness.

In 2012, Klein became Chief Marketing Officer at Arby's.

Klein served as CEO of the American Marketing Association in 2014 to 2021.
