= Bob Ralston =

American pianist and organist (1938–2025)

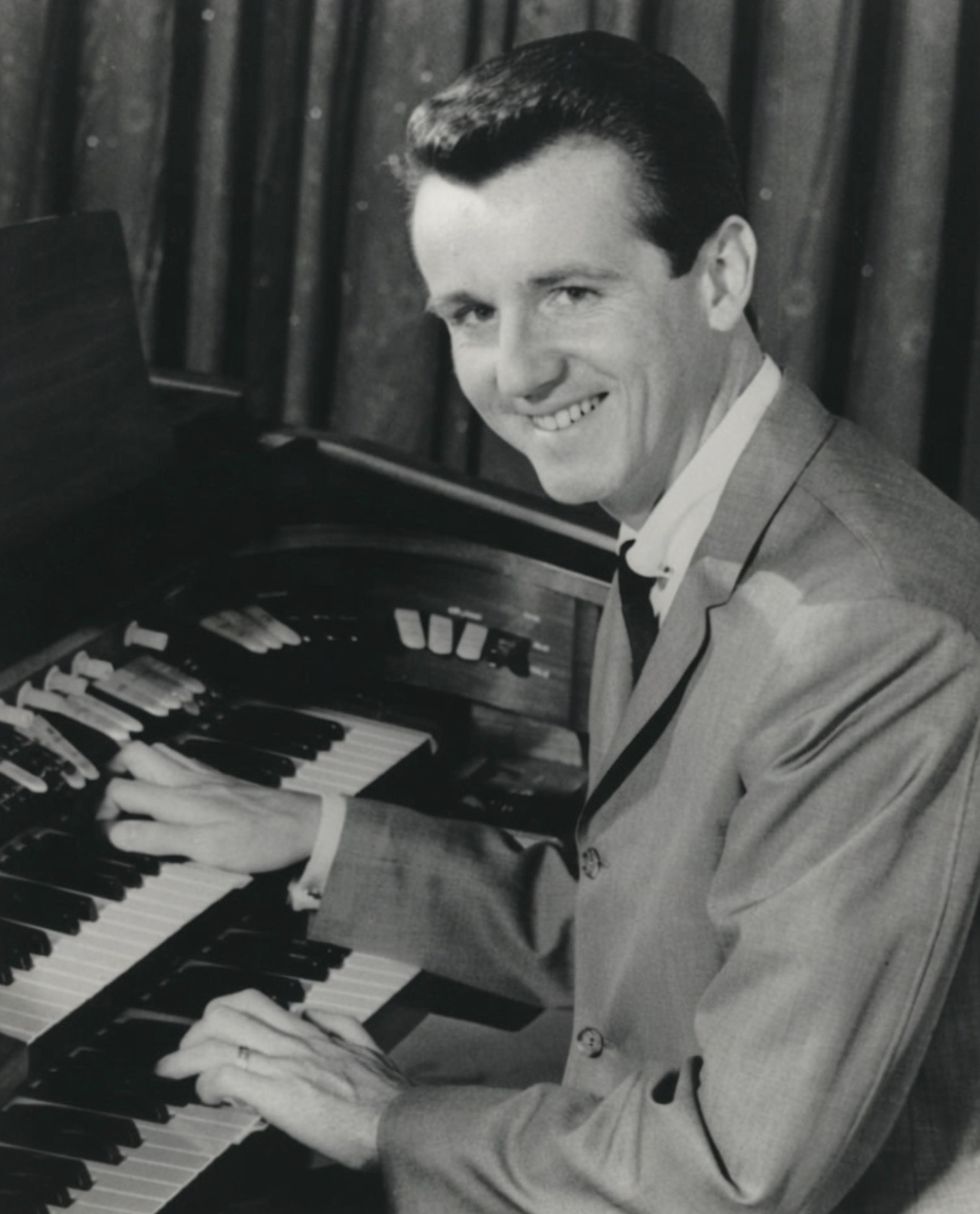
- Ralston in 1967
- Born: Robert Howard Ralston; July 2, 1938; Upland, California, U.S.
- Died: July 2, 2025 (aged 87); Los Angeles, California, U.S.
- Occupation: Musician
- Years active: 1957–2025
- Known for: Pianist and organist on The Lawrence Welk Show
- Spouse: Josephina "Fietje" Ralston (m. 1963)
- Children: 2
- Parent(s): Bradford and Marjorie Elizabeth Norton Ralston
- Relatives: Esther Ralston (aunt)

Robert Howard Ralston (July 2, 1938 – July 2, 2025) was an American pianist and organist who performed on television's The Lawrence Welk Show from 1963 until 1982, when the series ended.

== Career ==
A native of Southern California, Ralston graduated from Montebello High School in 1955 and attended Wheaton College in Illinois on a full music scholarship. Before finishing his degree, he transferred to the University of Southern California in Los Angeles, from which he earned a Bachelor of Music degree in composition and accompanying in 1964. During his college years, Ralston played six nights a week with the Freddy Martin orchestra (1959-1962) at Los Angeles's Coconut Grove nightclub, where in 1962, Welk invited him on his show as a guest musician.

Playing with Freddy Martin lasted until the summer of 1963, when one of Welk's original pianists, Jerry Burke, fell ill and soon died, and Ralston was hired on a permanent basis. The Welk programs feature Ralston's piano and organ solos, but they frequently include his performances as a singer, dancer, and comedian. He arranged music and continued to perform for the Music Makers live and on television until 1982 when Welk retired from active performing. Since 1988, he has been the pianist and organist for the Founders Church of Religious Science in Los Angeles, an affiliate of the Centers for Spiritual Living.

Throughout his career, Ralston had recorded several hundred albums; many of them as a solo artist or with bandleaders, including Welk, Ray Conniff, and Billy Vaughn. He was also been active in the preservation of theater pipe organs across America and was a guest conductor for several symphony orchestras. Ralston appeared as host in a 1999 PBS rerun of Lawrence Welk's "Time" show. He frequently held regular concerts in his home with various guest vocalists.

== Personal life ==
Ralston and his Dutch-born wife, Fietje, were married on March 3, 1963, and had two children. The Ralstons resided Granada Hills in the San Fernando Valley in Los Angeles.

Ralston's parents were Bradford Ralston and the former Marjorie Elizabeth Norton (1911–1998), an early cartoonist for Walt Disney. In 1928, Disney hired her as an inker, the thirteenth person employed by the new company. She was the first female voice actor for Minnie Mouse in the 1929 cartoon Wild Waves. Ralston's brother, Frederick Carleton "Rick" Ralston (born August 25, 1941), founded Crazy Shirts in Honolulu, Hawaii. His paternal aunt and uncle, Esther Ralston and Howard Ralston (1904–1992), were actors.

=== Legal issues ===
Ralston was arrested in 1984 for the molestation of a 13-year-old boy that he met in Times Square and brought to California. When police raided his home, pornographic slides were discovered of at least 13 other boys. Ralston eventually pled guilty to one felony count of committing a lewd act with a child under age 14. In a plea bargain with the District Attorney's Office, three other lewd conduct charges involving two other boys were dismissed. Los Angeles police detective Steve Hales stated outside the courtroom, "'In all my years working with sexually exploited children, that was the most inappropriate sentence on a pedophile I've ever seen." Ralston was sentenced to 5 years probation and no contact with children.

=== Death ===
Ralston died at his home in Los Angeles California, on July 2, 2025, his 87th birthday.
