= The Aldridge Sisters =

American singing act (born 1951)

- Sheila and Sherry Aldridge

Background information
- Origin: North Carolina, U.S.
- Members: Sheila Aldridge; Sherry Aldridge

The Aldridge Sisters, Sheila and Sherry Aldridge, are an American singing act that appeared on The Lawrence Welk Show from 1977 to 1982.

== The sisters and their family ==
Sherry Aldridge (born December 1, 1951) and Sheila Aldridge (born July 18, 1956) grew up in North Carolina. Their parents are the late Talton Aldridge and Jacqueline Goins Aldridge.

== Performing career ==
Sheila and Sherry started out singing in church, holiday pageants, nightclubs, high school plays and also performed in community theater, winning many musical and theatrical accolades. While looking for their big break in show business, they both worked as flight attendants for a major airline.

The Aldridge Sisters first auditioned for Lawrence Welk in 1977 when he and his musical family held a concert in nearby Nashville; although impressed, there weren't any openings at the time. It wasn't until three more auditions in the following months that they were asked to appear on the show as guest stars, after that initial appearance on national television followed by the resignation of Tanya Welk., they were hired as regulars. Not long after that, they were teamed with Roger and David Otwell, another newly hired sibling act to form the musical act of The Aldridge Sisters and Otwell Twins.

Since the Welk show, the sisters appeared on television shows including Dinah Shore, Hee Haw and the Welk reunion special Milestones and Memories for PBS. They also have been an opening act for Bob Hope, George Burns and have performed at casino resorts in Atlantic City, Las Vegas and Lake Tahoe, and toured with fellow Welk alumni in the concert series Forever Blowing Bubbles.

== Discography ==
Sheila and Sherry recorded a Christmas album, The Gift, with the Billy Andrusco Trio.
