= Jack Imel =

American musician and dancer (1932–2017)

- Born: June 9, 1932; Portland, Indiana, U.S.
- Died: April 30, 2017 (aged 84); Springville, California, U.S.
- Occupations: Musician, entertainer
- Spouse: Norma Jean Denney (m. 1951-2017 his death)
- Children: 5

Lawrence "Jack" Imel (June 9, 1932 – April 30, 2017) was an American musician, dancer, singer, and television producer who is best known for his work on The Lawrence Welk Show.

A tap dancer since the age of four, Imel later took up playing the marimba. He appeared in clubs and concerts in and around his hometown right through elementary and high school. Later, with the advent of the Korean War, Imel joined the U.S. Navy and considered a career as a sailor, but towards the end of his tour of duty he was stationed in San Diego. He made the trip up to Los Angeles to audition for the television show of bandleader Lawrence Welk. He was invited to join the cast of the show, and cemented his status on it in his debut performance in 1957.

After Imel spent about three months on the show, the Welk Show began receiving mail saying that he was "conceited" and a "show-off." To rectify the situation, Welk suggested that Imel take a place in the band, since most soloists on the show came from the band. Since the marimba was not designed to be a part of the orchestra, Jack was given unique percussion instruments to play, such as bells, the triangle, and the maracas. With this development, fans began to somewhat accept Imel.

Imel's career as a producer began with the hiring of tap dancer Arthur Duncan in 1964. With two hoofers on the show, Imel decided he needed to diversify, and began pitching production ideas. The show brass found them interesting, and he was invited to the production meetings; eventually, he became a full-fledged associate producer of the show. Beginning in the 1970s, he was paired with Mary Lou Metzger in specialty song and dance routines. Singing posed some difficulty until Imel was taught a speech-like technique similar to that used by Rex Harrison and James Cagney. Imel also became known for wearing animal costumes in various numbers, alongside dancer Bobby Burgess.

After retiring from the Welk organization in 2006 and from performing entirely two years later, Jack continued to be involved in entertainment as part of the audition committee for the City of Porterville City of Hope Spectacular.

== Family ==
Jack Imel and Norma Jean Denney were married on November 29, 1951, and their marriage lasted until Jack's death. Jack is buried at Green Park Cemetery in Portland, Indiana. He is survived by Norma and their five children.
