= Welk Resort Group =

Luxury Resort and Timeshare Development and Operation Corporation

Welk Resort Group, Inc.
- Type: Private
- Industry: Hospitality
- Founded: 1964
- Defunct: August 2023
- Headquarters: San Marcos, California, United States
- Key people: Lawrence Welk, founder Jon Fredricks, president and CEO
- Revenue: $190 million (2015) $147 million (2014)
- Website: welkresorts.com

Welk Resort Group was a corporation based in San Marcos, California that is a developer and operator of luxury resorts and timeshares in the United States and Mexico. It was founded in 1964 by television bandleader Lawrence Welk. As of 2015, the company has developed five properties in Cabo San Lucas, Lake Tahoe, San Diego, Palm Springs and Branson.

== History ==
In 1964, Welk purchased 900 acres (360 ha) of mostly undeveloped land near Escondido, California, 20 miles (32.2 km) north of San Diego. The property included a golf course, motel, and mobile home community. After the entertainer staged one of his shows at the site, it gained in popularity for tourism, eventually growing to include a theater, more golf, and vacation homes. As the initial property expanded, Larry Welk, a record company executive and Lawrence Welk's son, became the group's first CEO and guided the company into the timeshare business in the 1980s.

During the 50 years since the company's formation, the company has developed five luxury resorts with over 1000 vacation ownership accommodations. Ownership of the business has remained primarily with the Welk family, with seven family members and a former company president sharing 88 percent of ownership, along with 12 percent owned by employees through an employee stock ownership plan. The group is currently headed by Jon Fredricks, grandson of Lawrence Welk.

In 2021, Welk Resort Group entered into an agreement to be acquired by Marriott Vacations Worldwide Corporation for $430 million. The acquisition is expected to close in the second quarter of 2021, at the close of the deal all Welk Resort properties will be rebranded Hyatt Residence Club properties.

== Locations ==
=== Current ===
Welk Resorts' current portfolio of timeshare resorts are based in:

- Branson, Missouri
- Breckenridge, Colorado
- Cabo San Lucas, Mexico
- Northstar, Lake Tahoe, California
- Palm Springs, California
- San Diego, California
