= Larry Hooper =

American bass singer

Lawrence "Bullfrog" Hooper (July 22, 1917 in Independence, Missouri – June 10, 1983 in Los Angeles, California) was an American musician and vocalist. He was best known to television audiences as part of The Lawrence Welk Show as a featured singer and pianist in Welk's orchestra.

== Career ==
Born in Independence, Missouri and raised in Lebanon, Missouri, he joined the Welk band in 1948 when they were doing evening performances at the Roosevelt Hotel in New York City.

His popularity was largely due to his basso profundo voice, renditions of "This Old House" and "Asleep In The Deep," and his sense of humor. He also achieved success with songs like "Oh Happy Day" (Hooper's 1953 recording of the song with the Welk orchestra was a top-5 hit for the orchestra), "Ding Dong Daddy" and "Minnie the Mermaid", a duet sung with Jo Ann Castle.

Plagued with health problems for years, he left the show on sick leave in 1969 due to a heart condition, occasionally filling in with the orchestra when one of the other keyboardists got sick and making guest appearances during that time frame. He returned full-time for the first show of the 1973-74 season (the "Tribute to Disney" episode, singing "Oh Happy Day"). It drew a huge emotional standing ovation from the audience and cast although Larry was visibly lip-syncing and was always uncomfortable and short of breath during the performance. Larry had fewer solo and singing roles and was primarily in the band during the last couple of years of his appearances when his health began to fail again. He left the show for the final time in 1980 and three years later, he died of kidney failure. His remains were cremated in the Rosemary Chapel at Forest Lawn Memorial Park on June 14, 1983, following a memorial service.

== Posthumous use of Hooper's singing ==
In recent years, Hooper received new interest because of a video tape-loop played before Howie Mandel's stand-up shows of his singing "Oh Happy Day" for 20 minutes.
