= Charlie Parlato =

American musician (1919–2007)

Charles Parlato (February 16, 1919 – September 8, 2007) was an American musician who performed with the Lawrence Welk orchestra. His instrument was the trumpet.

== Bio ==
Born and raised in Fredonia, New York, Charlie studied music at Ithaca Conservatory before moving to Los Angeles in 1942 to pursue a career in showbiz. He performed with the David Rose and Kay Kyser bands as well with artists such as Tennessee Ernie Ford (TV show, "Sixteen Tons"), Red Skelton, Sam Cooke ("You Send Me"), Dinah Shore, Bing Crosby, Ernie Kovacs and Andy Williams. He also appeared in a non-speaking role in the 1952 movie Meet Danny Wilson.

During his time with Kay Kyser, Parlato was a member of The Campus Kids vocal group. Another member of the group – Judd Conlon – formed a new group called The Rhythmaires in 1947 and Parlato joined this. The Rhythmaires worked with Bing Crosby for almost ten years.

Parlato joined the Welk orchestra in 1962 as a trumpet player, he also was a regular on Welk's television show playing not just in the band, but also as a vocalist in choral numbers and was able to feature his comedic talents in the show's novelty numbers as well.

He died from natural causes in 2007 at the age of 88, and is survived by his wife Margaret and their five children and several grandchildren.

Charlie's granddaughter, Gretchen Parlato is an accomplished jazz vocalist and composer, three time Grammy nominee and 2004 winner of the Thelonious Monk International Jazz Vocals Competition.
