= Tom Netherton =

- Birth name: Thomas Harold Netherton Jr.
- Born: January 11, 1947; Munich, Germany
- Died: January 7, 2018 (aged 70)
- Genres: Traditional gospel, pop, Contemporary Christian
- Occupation(s): Singer, actor
- Instrument: Vocals
- Years active: 1973–2017
- Labels: Welk Music Group, Word

Thomas Harold Netherton Jr. (January 11, 1947 – January 7, 2018), was an American singer. He was known for his tenure on The Lawrence Welk Show.

== Early life ==
Netherton was born on January 11, 1947, in Munich, Germany while his father, a United States Army officer, was stationed there. The eldest of four children, Netherton and his family relocated frequently due to his father's Army career. The Nethertons permanently settled in Bloomington, Minnesota in 1961.

After enlisting in the Army during the Vietnam War, Netherton was stationed in Panama, serving as a 2nd Lieutenant. He had also decided to pursue a singing career and sang with Army and Air Force music ensembles. Netherton became a born again Christian following a sermon he heard at a Baptist church in Panama, spending a year at the Bethany Fellowship Missionary Training Center in Bloomington after his discharge from the Army. Faced with making a choice between missionary service and a career in entertainment, Netherton chose to follow the same path taken by his idol, Pat Boone, and became a Christian singer.

== Career ==
Netherton joined the Lawrence Welk show cast in 1973. His inclusion with Welk's group of entertainers came as a result of a recommendation to Welk by Harold and Sheila Schafer, owners of a North Dakota theater where Netherton had been performing. Netherton appeared regularly on the Lawrence Welk show from 1973 to 1981. In 1975 he appeared on "The Dating Game", choosing from three bachelorettes. In 1979, he wrote an autobiography titled "In The Morning of My Life".

Apart from his long-time attachment to the Welk program, Netherton recorded both Christian and secular music albums while still on the program and after. His career post-Lawrence Welk included touring and performing around the United States as well as acting in stage musical productions of Oklahoma! and Carousel. During the 1970s and 1980s he appeared on television commercials for Rose Milk skin care lotion and Nabisco's Triscuits crackers. Netherton was a guest on television shows such as Pat Robertson's The 700 Club, Robert Schuller's The Hour of Power and would appear at Billy Graham religious crusades.

== Personal life ==
As of late 2007, Netherton had been living in Goshen, Indiana where he performed for holiday programs and entertaining local senior citizens at Greencroft Senior Center. Netherton never married. On January 11, 2018, Netherton's younger brother, Brad Netherton, announced on his Facebook page that the singer had died from pneumonia and the flu on January 7, 2018, at age 70, just 4 days before his 71st birthday. An obituary appeared on the Nashville Funeral and Cremation web site.

== Discography ==
- 1975: My Favorite Hymns
- 1975: What a Friend We Have in Jesus
- 1977: Love Songs
- 1978: Hem of His Garment
- 1979: The Lord's Prayer
- 1981: Reflection
- 1984: Scrap Book
- 1985: Songs of the Savior
- 1987: The Tom Netherton Christmas Album
- 1992: How Great Thou Art
- 1994: 22 Great Songs Of Faith
- 1995: Gospel Favorites
- 1996: Just As I Am

== Books ==
- 1979: In the Morning of My Life, autobiography, Tyndale House, 1979.
