= Aragon Ballroom (Ocean Park, Santa Monica, California) =

Coordinates: 33.9958°N 118.4814°W

The Aragon Ballroom on Lick Pier in the Ocean Park district of Santa Monica, California was a social-dance venue opened under the Aragon name in March 1942 by dance promoter Harry Schooler (1918–2008).

== History ==
The ballroom and the pier, named Lick Pier, were erected in 1922. The pier was situated at the foot of Navy Street adjoining the south side of the Pickering Pier. Lick Pier was, in 1922, almost entirely in Venice. It was 800 feet long and 225 feet wide. At the opening of Lick Pier and the Bon Ton Ballroom on Easter weekend 1922, the ballroom was 22,000 square feet, and the pier featured a Zip roller coaster, a Dodge'em, Caterpillar rides, and Captive Aeroplane rides. Development, costing $250,000, commenced in 1921 and was financed by Charles Jacob Lick (1882–1971), Austin Aloysius McFadden (1875–1960), and George William Leihy (1865–1940).

Schooler, whose Swing Shift Dances had originally been held at the nearby Casino Gardens, signed a 10-year lease in 1942 for the old Ocean Park venue, which was said to have 1,500 electric lights and 14,000 square feet (1,300 m^{2}) of floor space, from owner Charles Lick. Schooler renamed it the Aragon, then spent some $50,000 to refurbish it.

In August 1943, 25-year-old Harry Schooler was earning $55 per week as a toolmaker at Douglas Aircraft Co. in Santa Monica during the graveyard shift, a job which he later claimed he retained to protect himself from the wartime draft. His Swing Shift Dances had originally been held at the nearby Casino Gardens until he signed a 10-year lease in 1942 for the old Ocean Park venue, which was said to have 1,500 electric lights and 14,000 square feet (1,300 m^{2}) of floor space, from owner Charles Lick. Schooler renamed it the Aragon, then spent some $50,000 to refurbish it. But the balance of his reported $250,000 per year gross income came from his several roles as dance hall impresario, bandleader and promoter, which by August 1943 included seven nights a week at the Aragon Ballroom, Friday and Saturday nights with the Swing Shift Dances (12:30 a.m. to 5 a.m.) at the nearby Casino Gardens, monthly dances for African Americans at the Shrine Auditorium in Los Angeles and barn dancing in the Plantation Ballroom in Culver City.

Billboard magazine reported in July 1944 that "cowboy outfits" such as Spade Cooley and Bob Wills had been, and would continue to be, booked to play at the ballroom.

The Aragon was later known as the hall where Lawrence Welk and his big band, the "Champagne Music Makers," parlayed a scheduled four-week engagement in spring 1951 into a ten-year stint and a noted television show, though he had been a regular there for some years prior. Welk's orchestra played to crowds numbering as high as over 13,000 people. Klaus Landsberg, the manager of Los Angeles television station KTLA, offered Welk the opportunity to appear on television, and on May 11, 1951, the station began broadcasting a weekly show live from the Aragon featuring Welk's band. The show evolved into The Lawrence Welk Show, broadcast each Saturday night on ABC.

Welk’s stint at the Aragon ended in 1955, when he moved The Lawrence Welk Show to a television studio in Hollywood. The Aragon soon went into decline. In 1963 it was opened briefly for dancing by Ralph Morris, the promoter from The Rendezvous Ballroom in Balboa. "The Beach Boys" opened, and "The Challengers" were the dance band. But "Surf music" did not produce the crowds it had in Balboa, and the Aragon was soon closed again. During 1965-66 it became a roller skating rink. A famous Roller Derby skater, Charlie "Specs" Saunders was the owner. Around 1967 it became the Cheetah Club where bands including The Doors and Pink Floyd played as well as The Nazz (an outfit that evolved into Alice Cooper not the band featuring Todd Rundgren). It was destroyed by a fire on May 26, 1970.

A major sequence in the 1950 film Young Man with a Horn featuring Kirk Douglas, Doris Day and Hoagy Carmichael was set and filmed at the Aragon and remains the best film evidence of what the ballroom looked like in its heyday. The fictional "Pacific Ballroom" in the 1969 film They Shoot Horses, Don't They? was modeled after the Aragon, although the film itself was shot on a soundstage in Burbank.

A band, that recorded on Atlantic Records, named Country, did a song, on its first album, called Aragon Ballroom. Country was led by Tom Snow and Michael Fondiler, R.I.P. Their song, "Aragon Ballroom," was produced by Ahmet Ertegun, the President of Atlantic Records.

== Notable performers ==
The Bon Ton Ballroom: 1922–1942

- 1922–1924: Harry Baisden and His Bon Ton Orchestra
- 1924–1925: Ben Pollack and His Bon Ton Orchestra

The Aragon Ballroom: 1942–1967

- 1944: Spade Cooley
- 1944: Bob Wills
- 1951–1955: Lawrence Welk

Cheetah Club: 1967–1970

- 1969: Black Pearl
- Charles Wright & the Watts 103rd Street Rhythm Band
- The Grateful Dead
- The Standells
- The Doors
- The Leaves
- Iron Butterfly
- Pink Floyd
- Alice Cooper
