= Dick Dale (singer) =

American singer and saxophone player

Richard L. Dale (September 14, 1926 – December 26, 2014) was an American singer and musician, best known as a featured singer and saxophone player on the television variety show The Lawrence Welk Show.

A native of Algona, Iowa, he served in the United States Navy during World War II after graduation from Algona High School. His entertainment career began when he worked for several bands such as Harold Loeffelmacher and his Six Fat Dutchmen polka band. He was hired by Lawrence Welk in 1951.

During his tenure on The Lawrence Welk Show, in addition to playing the saxophone, Dale sang not just solos but also in duets, performed in comedy sketches, dances, and also played Santa Claus for many years on the Christmas shows. Even after the show ended when its host went into retirement in 1982, he continued to perform with his fellow Welk alumni. From 1990 to 1996, he co-owned and operated the Rainbow Music Theater in Pigeon Forge, Tennessee, with fellow Welk star Ava Barber.

He married his wife, Marguerite, in 1949, and they had four children. They lived in Los Angeles during the Lawrence Welk years. After making their home in Sparks, Nevada, for several years, the Dales moved back to his hometown of Algona, Iowa, in 2006. He died there on December 26, 2014.
