= Ava Barber =

American country music singer (born 1954)

- Born: Ava Marlene Barber; June 28, 1954 (age 72); Knoxville, Tennessee, U.S.
- Genres: Country
- Occupation: Singer
- Instrument: Vocals
- Years active: 1974–present
- Label: Ranwood

Ava Marlene Barber (born June 28, 1954) is an American country music singer and performer. She is best remembered for her performances on The Lawrence Welk Show throughout much of the 1970s and early 1980s.

She is also known as a recording artist, her best-known hit being the song "Bucket to the South", which peaked at No. 13 on the Hot Country Songs list in 1978. She has done many reunion specials on PBS for The Lawrence Welk Show over the past number of years.

== Early life and rise to fame ==
Ava Marlene Barber was born on June 28, 1954, in Knoxville, Tennessee, and was named after her mother's favorite actress Ava Gardner and singer Marlene Dietrich. While growing up, Barber often played in her brother's band.

Barber began listening to country music when her father would turn on the radio to a country music station every morning. Soon, every Saturday night, Barber would go to the auditorium of WNOX Radio, where "The Tennessee Barndance" was performed.

She began singing professionally at age 10. Her mother was a fan of The Lawrence Welk Show television show, and suggested that her daughter write to Welk in 1973. He responded, suggesting that if she was on the West Coast, she should be on the show. About this same time, she married singer and musician Roger Sullivan.

== The Lawrence Welk Show and success as a country singer ==
Soon, Barber was hired as a regular on The Lawrence Welk Show, and found herself performing on his television series on the West Coast. At the same time, Barber was trying to get her country music career off the ground. Chart success didn't come initially, but she released her first charting single in 1977 with the song, "Waitin' At the End of Your Run", a truck-driving song. The song was only moderately successful, though, reaching only No. 70 on the country singles charts that year. Barber's 1978 release, "Bucket to the South", turned into a big country hit, peaking at No. 13 on the Hot Country Songs list in 1978 and reaching No. 12 in Canada. Being a country singer brought her instant fame and she soon appeared on many television shows such as Nashville Now and Crook & Chase. She also made two appearances on the Grand Ole Opry.

Barber's success on the country charts tapered off after the success of "Bucket to the South". She was off the country charts until 1981, when she made a comeback with the single "I Think I Could Love You Better Than She Did". When The Lawrence Welk Show ended in 1982, Barber and her husband Roger returned to Knoxville, where they purchased their own bus and formed their own band, Sweet Apple. They toured the United States and Canada singing and performing.

== Career in the 1990s and life today ==
In 1990, Barber and Sullivan went into business with Dick Dale and leased a theater located in Pigeon Forge, Tennessee, which they operated until 1996. From 1997 to 2000, Barber worked at the Welk Theatre in Branson, Missouri. Since 2000, she has toured with former members of The Lawrence Welk Show and performed on her own. She does reunion specials for PBS with previous members of the show.

== Discography ==
=== Albums ===
Year	Album
1977	Country as Grits
1978	You're Gonna Love Love

=== Singles ===
Year	Single	Chart Positions		Album
Year	Single	US Country	CAN Country	Album
1977	"Waitin' at the End of Your Run"	70	—	Country as Grits
1977	"Your Love Is My Refuge"	92	—	You're Gonna Love Love
1977	"Don't Take My Sunshine Away"	69	—	You're Gonna Love Love
1978	"Bucket to the South"	13	12	You're Gonna Love Love
1978	"You're Gonna Love Love"	44	—	You're Gonna Love Love
1978	"Healin'"	75	—	singles only
1981	"I Think I Could Love You Better Than She Did"	70	—	singles only
