= Let the Eagle Soar =

Song by John Ashcroft
- Released: 2002
- Recorded: February 23, 2002; Gordon–Conwell Theological Seminary, Charlotte, North Carolina
- Length: 5:00
- Songwriter: John Ashcroft
- Producer: John Ashcroft

"Let the Eagle Soar" is a song written by former Missouri Senator and U.S. Attorney General John Ashcroft, who is seen singing the song at a Gordon-Conwell Theological Seminary function on February 23, 2002. The song was sung during President of the United States George W. Bush's second inauguration in January 2005 by Guy Hovis, a vocalist from the 1970s variety program The Lawrence Welk Show.

On July 4, 2011 Angela McKenzie, a singer and radio personality of the syndicated program Initiative Radio with Angela McKenzie, quietly released a contemporary Country music version of the song as a digital download with the official approval and blessing of John Ashcroft.

== Background ==
John Ashcroft sang in The Singing Senators, a group of U.S. Senators who sang as a barbershop quartet.

== In popular culture ==
- "Let the Eagle Soar" was sung by lil' John Ashcroft on an episode of Lil' Bush.
- It has also been frequently mocked on late-night comedy shows such as The Daily Show with Jon Stewart, The Colbert Report and the Late Show with David Letterman.
- It is part of Michael Moore's documentary Fahrenheit 9/11, and is also featured in the trailer.
- It was used in the 2015 film The Big Short and the 2021 film Don't Look Up.
