= Guy & Ralna =

American popular music singing duo

- Genres: Southern gospel
- Years active: 1970–2025
- Label: Ranwood
- Past members: Guy Hovis; Ralna English

Guy & Ralna was an American singing duo who appeared as regulars on television's The Lawrence Welk Show from 1970 to 1982.

== Musical career ==
The act consists of Guy Hovis and Ralna English, who married in early 1969 and made their Welk debut on his Christmas show the same year. English had been a solo performer on the show for a few months, having already joined in mid-1969. They specialize in country, gospel, big band and popular music.

The couple has released a number of albums, including Hymns We Love To Sing, which was nominated for a Dove Award in 1972. Country Songs We Love to Sing, released in 1973, peaked at No. 21 on the Billboard Country Albums chart. Their popularity peaked in the 1970s, at which time they had their own fan club and made numerous appearances on other television shows and commercials.

When the Welk show ended in 1982, and later when the couple divorced in 1984, the act disbanded for a while. They later reunited professionally and continued to perform, both at PBS pledge specials and in concert venues. They have also performed at political appearances of U.S. Senator Trent Lott, a college friend of Hovis's.

Hovis died January 22, 2026.

== Discography ==
Lawrence Welk Presents Guy & Ralna

- Released: 1970

Hymns We Love to Sing

- Released: 1972

Country Songs We Love to Sing

- Released: 1973

Give Me That Old Time Religion

- Released: 1973

Guy & Ralna Country

- Released: 1974

Lovelight

- Released: 1975

How Great Thou Art

- Released: 1975

Love Songs

- Released: 1976

22 Great Songs of Faith

- Released: 1978

You Asked For It

- Released: 1979

The Lord's Prayer

- Released: 1982
