= The Singing Senators =

Barbershop quartet

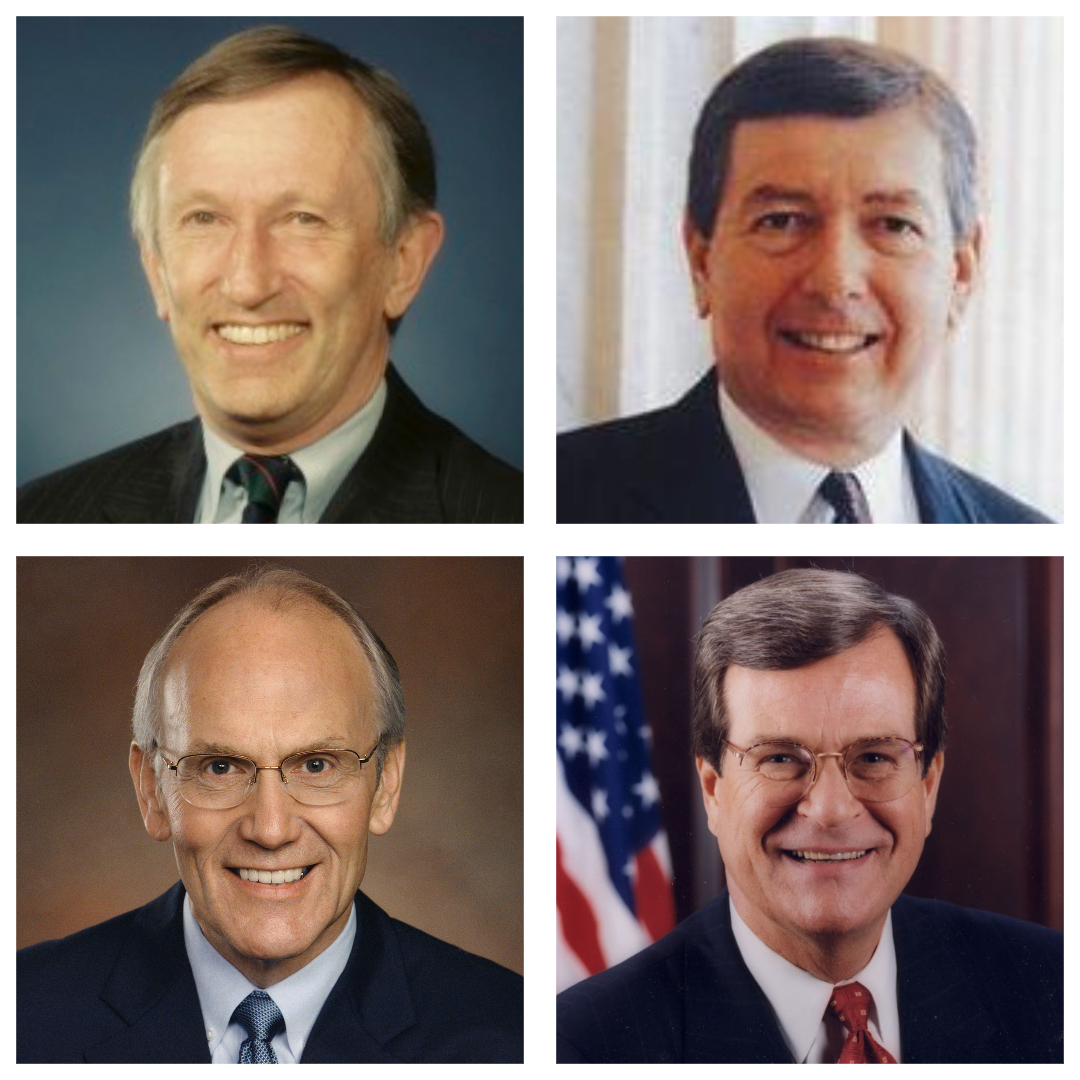
- Lineup of The Singing Senators. Clockwise from top left: Jim Jeffords, John Ashcroft, Trent Lott, Larry Craig

Background information
- Origin: Washington, D.C., United States
- Genre: Barbershop music
- Years active: 1995–2000, 2007
- Past members: Jim Jeffords (1995–2000); John Ashcroft; Trent Lott; Larry Craig

The Singing Senators were a group of U.S. Republican senators who sang as a barbershop quartet.

== Members ==
In 2000, the members were John Ashcroft (baritone), Larry Craig (lead), Jim Jeffords (tenor), and Trent Lott (bass).

== History ==
=== Beginnings ===
In 1995, at New Hampshire Senator Bob Smith's birthday party, Ashcroft, Jeffords, Lott, and Connie Mack sang "Happy Birthday". Later, when Senator Bob Packwood was having a birthday party, Jeffords called Lott and suggested that the four of them sing at the party. Mack declined, but Larry Craig joined. According to his autobiography, Herding Cats, A Life in Politics, Lott formed the group in large part to improve relations between the Republican Conference, of which Lott was Majority Leader, and Jeffords, a Republican who frequently voted with the Democrats.

During the initial years, the four senators usually practiced in Lott's hideaway office. Guy Hovis, the Mississippi state director for Lott, trained the senators, who practiced together every day.

=== 1995–2000 ===
Their first official performance of the group was in October 1995 for the American Council of Young Political Leaders (ACYPL), in which they sang "Elvira" at a fundraising event at the Kennedy Center organized by Ray Ivey of Consolidated Natural Gas. In December 1995, the group appeared on The Today Show.

External videos
- The Singing Senators perform at a tribute for retiring Sen. Mark Hatfield (R-OR), July 18, 1996, C-SPAN

In April 1996, the Oak Ridge Boys sang with the group at a Senate reception; it was described in The Hill as "Congressional Harmony". In September 1996 the group performed again with the Oak Ridge Boys in Branson, Missouri. The same year, the senators sang at the 1996 Republican National Convention.

In 1998, the group released their only album, Let Freedom Sing, a ten-song CD recorded in Nashville. In 2000, clips of the group's songs could be streamed from the Senate pages of Ashcroft and Jeffords.

In November 2000, Ashcroft lost his Senate re-election race (he was appointed Attorney General in early 2001). In May 2001, Jeffords announced he was leaving the Republican Party to become an Independent, returning control of the Senate to the Democrats. The two events led to the apparent demise of the group.

=== Revival ===
In October 2006, Lott and Craig said they were putting the quartet back together after a six-year hiatus. They said they had found two solid prospects in Senators Bob Bennett and John Thune.

In June 2007, Ashcroft, Craig, and Lott gave their first public performance in more than six years. Craig was subsequently inducted into the Idaho Hall of Fame, having been selected in March 2007. Craig said that the group was now a trio. Lott's announced resignation in 2007 seemed to put the existence of even a trio in doubt. Craig's decision to not run for another term in 2008 — due in part to the controversy over his arrest for solicitation the previous year — spelled the formal end of the group.

== In fiction ==
The political satire television series Alpha House includes a barbershop quartet called The Singing Senators in episode 1 of season 2.

== See also ==
- Second Amendments – an American rock group consisting of members of the House
- MP4 – a British rock group containing four politicians
- Gi!nz - A Japanese band composed of members of the Liberal Democratic Party in the National Diet
