= 2000 United States Senate election in Mississippi =

- November 7, 2000
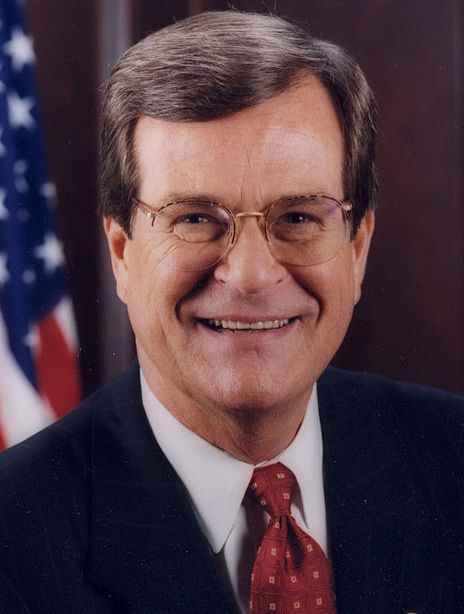

Nominee	Trent Lott	Troy D. Brown
Party	Republican	Democratic
Popular vote	654,941	314,090
Percentage	65.88%	31.59%
- Lott: 40–50% 50–60% 60–70% 70–80% 80–90% Brown: 40–50% 50–60% 60–70%
U.S. senator before election
Trent Lott
Republican
Elected U.S. Senator
Trent Lott
Republican

The 2000 United States Senate election in Mississippi was held on November 7, 2000. Incumbent Republican U.S. Senator Trent Lott won re-election to a third term.

== General election ==
=== Candidates ===
- Troy Brown, perennial candidate (Democratic)
- Jim Giles (Independent)
- Trent Lott, incumbent U.S. Senator since 1989 (Republican)
- Lewis Napper (Libertarian)
- Shawn O'Hara (Others)

=== Results ===
2000 United States Senate election in Mississippi
Party	Candidate	Votes	%	±%
Republican	Trent Lott	654,941	65.88%	−2.92%
Democratic	Troy D. Brown	314,090	31.59%	+0.39%
Independent	Jim Giles	9,344	0.94%	N/A
Libertarian	Lewis Napper	8,454	0.85%	N/A
Reform	Shawn O'Hara	7,315	0.74%	N/A
Total votes		994,144	100.00%	N/A
Republican hold				

==== By county ====
County	Trent Lott Republican		Troy D. Brown Democratic		Various candidates Other parties		Margin		Total
County	#	%	#	%	#	%	#	%	Total
Adams	7,183	49.90%	7,062	49.06%	151	1.05%	121	0.84%	14,396
Alcorn	7,895	72.64%	2,581	23.75%	392	3.61%	5,314	48.90%	10,868
Amite	4,114	61.40%	2,405	35.90%	181	2.70%	1,709	25.51%	6,700
Attala	4,931	65.89%	2,428	32.44%	125	1.67%	2,503	33.44%	7,484
Benton	2,139	62.05%	1,178	34.17%	130	3.77%	961	27.88%	3,447
Bolivar	5,781	46.13%	6,391	50.99%	361	2.88%	-610	-4.87%	12,533
Calhoun	4,356	75.34%	1,313	22.71%	113	1.95%	3,043	52.63%	5,782
Carroll	3,600	70.20%	1,443	28.14%	85	1.66%	2,157	42.06%	5,128
Chickasaw	4,508	62.54%	2,400	33.30%	300	4.16%	2,108	29.25%	7,208
Choctaw	2,739	72.59%	960	25.44%	74	1.96%	1,779	47.15%	3,773
Claiborne	1,452	31.63%	3,075	66.99%	63	1.37%	-1,623	-35.36%	4,590
Clarke	4,993	68.94%	2,100	28.99%	150	2.07%	2,893	39.94%	7,243
Clay	4,700	54.59%	3,737	43.41%	172	2.00%	963	11.19%	8,609
Coahoma	4,163	51.55%	3,719	46.05%	194	2.40%	444	5.50%	8,076
Copiah	6,381	57.90%	4,431	40.21%	209	1.90%	1,950	17.69%	11,021
Covington	5,178	72.59%	1,653	23.17%	302	4.23%	3,525	49.42%	7,133
DeSoto	27,103	78.07%	6,692	19.28%	921	2.65%	20,411	58.79%	34,716
Forrest	15,571	68.90%	6,371	28.19%	657	2.91%	9,200	40.71%	22,599
Franklin	2,799	69.96%	1,125	28.12%	77	1.92%	1,674	41.84%	4,001
George	5,759	78.70%	1,386	18.94%	173	2.36%	4,373	59.76%	7,318
Greene	3,649	78.98%	893	19.33%	78	1.69%	2,756	59.65%	4,620
Grenada	5,666	61.75%	3,319	36.17%	190	2.07%	2,347	25.58%	9,175
Hancock	10,978	74.98%	3,151	21.52%	512	3.50%	7,827	53.46%	14,641
Harrison	37,221	71.50%	13,160	25.28%	1,675	3.22%	24,061	46.22%	52,056
Hinds	42,960	51.39%	37,112	44.39%	3,523	4.21%	5,848	7.00%	83,595
Holmes	2,611	34.11%	4,908	64.12%	135	1.76%	-2,297	-30.01%	7,654
Humphreys	1,978	45.71%	2,254	52.09%	95	2.20%	-276	-6.38%	4,327
Issaquena	432	48.70%	435	49.04%	20	2.25%	-3	-0.34%	887
Itawamba	6,688	78.04%	1,645	19.19%	237	2.77%	5,043	58.84%	8,570
Jackson	32,638	73.67%	10,144	22.90%	1,522	3.44%	22,494	50.77%	44,304
Jasper	4,170	59.20%	2,696	38.27%	178	2.53%	1,474	20.93%	7,044
Jefferson	1,270	36.67%	2,087	60.27%	106	3.06%	-817	-23.59%	3,463
Jefferson Davis	3,059	56.42%	2,218	40.91%	145	2.67%	841	15.51%	5,422
Jones	17,922	73.26%	6,098	24.93%	444	1.81%	11,824	48.33%	24,464
Kemper	2,235	49.06%	2,222	48.77%	99	2.17%	13	0.29%	4,556
Lafayette	8,417	66.76%	3,873	30.72%	318	2.52%	4,544	36.04%	12,608
Lamar	13,734	82.62%	2,118	12.74%	771	4.64%	11,616	69.88%	16,623
Lauderdale	18,271	71.67%	6,736	26.42%	487	1.91%	11,535	45.25%	25,494
Lawrence	4,298	68.06%	1,830	28.98%	187	2.96%	2,468	39.08%	6,315
Leake	4,858	66.77%	2,246	30.87%	172	2.36%	2,612	35.90%	7,276
Lee	17,834	72.12%	6,499	26.28%	395	1.60%	11,335	45.84%	24,728
Leflore	5,068	46.56%	5,582	51.29%	234	2.15%	-514	-4.72%	10,884
Lincoln	9,775	71.80%	3,614	26.54%	226	1.66%	6,161	45.25%	13,615
Lowndes	12,855	64.77%	6,534	32.92%	457	2.30%	6,321	31.85%	19,846
Madison	20,884	68.88%	8,717	28.75%	718	2.37%	12,167	40.13%	30,319
Marion	7,796	68.71%	3,308	29.15%	243	2.14%	4,488	39.55%	11,347
Marshall	5,439	47.43%	5,858	51.09%	170	1.48%	-419	-3.65%	11,467
Monroe	8,905	64.36%	4,689	33.89%	243	1.76%	4,216	30.47%	13,837
Montgomery	3,213	63.09%	1,785	35.05%	95	1.87%	1,428	28.04%	5,093
Neshoba	7,360	79.09%	1,715	18.43%	231	2.48%	5,645	60.66%	9,306
Newton	5,846	74.33%	1,890	24.03%	129	1.64%	3,956	50.30%	7,865
Noxubee	2,156	40.86%	2,986	56.60%	134	2.54%	-830	-15.73%	5,276
Oktibbeha	9,190	61.67%	5,429	36.43%	282	1.89%	3,761	25.24%	14,901
Panola	6,884	57.29%	4,900	40.78%	232	1.93%	1,984	16.51%	12,016
Pearl River	12,603	75.91%	3,599	21.68%	401	2.42%	9,004	54.23%	16,603
Perry	3,618	78.41%	867	18.79%	129	2.80%	2,751	59.62%	4,614
Pike	8,755	56.58%	6,339	40.97%	380	2.46%	2,416	15.61%	15,474
Pontotoc	7,474	78.91%	1,881	19.86%	117	1.24%	5,593	59.05%	9,472
Prentiss	6,288	72.79%	2,183	25.27%	168	1.94%	4,105	47.52%	8,639
Quitman	1,773	47.31%	1,849	49.33%	126	3.36%	-76	-2.03%	3,748
Rankin	35,141	82.64%	6,621	15.57%	763	1.79%	28,520	67.07%	42,525
Scott	6,153	67.04%	2,929	31.91%	96	1.05%	3,224	35.13%	9,178
Sharkey	1,283	48.52%	1,303	49.28%	58	2.19%	-20	-0.76%	2,644
Simpson	6,870	70.37%	2,719	27.85%	174	1.78%	4,151	42.52%	9,763
Smith	5,464	81.18%	1,124	16.70%	143	2.12%	4,340	64.48%	6,731
Stone	4,144	74.71%	1,180	21.27%	223	4.02%	2,964	53.43%	5,547
Sunflower	4,313	47.74%	4,539	50.24%	183	2.03%	-226	-2.50%	9,035
Tallahatchie	3,225	54.99%	2,479	42.27%	161	2.75%	746	12.72%	5,865
Tate	5,982	66.21%	2,895	32.04%	158	1.75%	3,087	34.17%	9,035
Tippah	6,516	76.27%	1,844	21.58%	183	2.14%	4,672	54.69%	8,543
Tishomingo	4,800	68.20%	2,098	29.81%	140	1.99%	2,702	38.39%	7,038
Tunica	1,137	45.61%	1,232	49.42%	124	4.97%	-95	-3.81%	2,493
Union	6,979	75.53%	2,172	23.51%	89	0.96%	4,807	52.02%	9,240
Walthall	4,136	67.95%	1,712	28.13%	239	3.93%	2,424	39.82%	6,087
Warren	12,253	67.18%	5,672	31.10%	314	1.72%	6,581	36.08%	18,239
Washington	8,915	53.32%	7,465	44.65%	340	2.03%	1,450	8.67%	16,720
Wayne	5,677	69.58%	2,326	28.51%	156	1.91%	3,351	41.07%	8,159
Webster	3,754	79.32%	881	18.61%	98	2.07%	2,873	60.70%	4,733
Wilkinson	1,773	41.90%	2,299	54.34%	159	3.76%	-526	-12.43%	4,231
Winston	5,381	61.51%	3,232	36.95%	135	1.54%	2,149	24.57%	8,748
Yalobusha	3,194	59.28%	2,067	38.36%	127	2.36%	1,127	20.92%	5,388
Yazoo	5,735	60.80%	3,482	36.91%	216	2.29%	2,253	23.88%	9,433
Totals	654,941	65.88%	314,090	31.59%	25,113	2.53%	340,851	34.29%	994,144

==== Counties that flipped from Republican to Democratic ====
- Quitman (Largest city: Lambert)
- Sharkey (Largest city: Rolling Fork)
- Issaquena (Largest city: Mayersville)
- Marshall (Largest city: Holly Springs)
- Noxubee (Largest city: Macon)
- Bolivar (Largest city: Cleveland)
- Sunflower (Largest city: Indianola)
- LeFlore (Largest city: Greenwood)

== See also ==
- 2000 United States Senate elections
