= Jim Jeffords =

American politician (1934–2014)

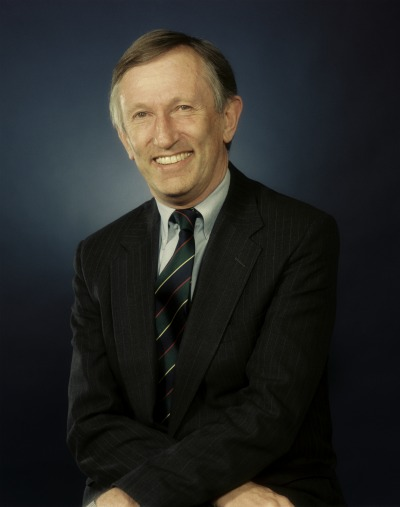

United States Senator from Vermont
- In office January 3, 1989 – January 3, 2007
- Preceded by: Robert Stafford
- Succeeded by: Bernie Sanders
Committee positions 1997–2003
Chair of the Senate Environment and Public Works Committee
In office June 6, 2001 – January 3, 2003
Preceded by	Bob Smith
Succeeded by	Jim Inhofe
Chair of the Senate Health, Education, Labor and Pensions Committee
In office January 20, 2001 – June 6, 2001
Preceded by	Ted Kennedy
Succeeded by	Ted Kennedy
In office January 3, 1997 – January 3, 2001
Preceded by	Nancy Kassebaum
Succeeded by	Ted Kennedy

Member of the U.S. House of Representatives from Vermont's at-large district
- In office January 3, 1975 – January 3, 1989
- Preceded by: Richard W. Mallary
- Succeeded by: Peter Plympton Smith

20th Attorney General of Vermont
- In office January 9, 1969 – January 3, 1973
- Governor: Deane C. Davis
- Preceded by: James L. Oakes
- Succeeded by: Kimberly B. Cheney

Member of the Vermont Senate from Rutland County
- In office January 4, 1967 – January 8, 1969 Serving with George W. F. Cook, Andrew Orzel, Ellery Purdy
- Preceded by: George W. F. Cook; Ellery Purdy; William Burke
- Succeeded by: Andrew Orzel; Ellery Purdy; Sanborn Partridge; Robert West

Personal details
- Born: James Merrill Jeffords; May 11, 1934 Rutland, Vermont, U.S.
- Died: August 18, 2014 (aged 80) Washington, D.C., U.S.
- Party: Republican (before 2001); Independent (2001–2014)
- Other political affiliations: Senate Democratic Caucus (2001–2007)
- Spouses: Liz Daley (m. 1961; div. 1978) (m. 1986; died 2007)
- Children: 2
- Relatives: Olin M. Jeffords (father)
- Education: Yale University (BS); Harvard University (JD)

Military service
- Branch/service: United States Navy
- Years of service: 1956–1959 (active); 1959–1990 (reserve)
- Rank: Captain
- Unit: USS McNair; United States Navy Reserve
- Battles/wars: 1956 Suez Crisis; 1958 Lebanon crisis
- Jim Jeffords's voice Jeffords speaks on desertification Recorded June 17, 1998

James Merrill Jeffords (May 11, 1934 – August 18, 2014) was an American lawyer and politician from Vermont. Originally a Republican, he served as a member of the Vermont Senate from 1967 to 1969 and Vermont Attorney General 1969 to 1973. He lost the 1972 Republican primary for governor of Vermont, but in 1974 he won Vermont's at-large seat in the United States House of Representatives. He served in the US House from 1975 to 1989, and in 1988 won election to the United States Senate. In 2001, Jeffords left the Republican Party to become an independent and began caucusing with the senate's Democrats. Jeffords served in the Senate from 1989 until 2007.

The son of Vermont Supreme Court Chief Justice Olin M. Jeffords, Jeffords was born and raised in Rutland. He graduated from Yale University, served for three years in the United States Navy, and then attended Harvard Law School, from which he received his degree in 1962. Jeffords served in the United States Navy Reserve while practicing law in southern Vermont. He became a resident of Shrewsbury, where he was active in local politics and government as a Republican, including serving as chairman of the town's Republican committee. His election to a Vermont Senate seat in 1966 set him on the path to a political career, and he won the state attorney general's post in 1968. After two terms, Jeffords was an unsuccessful candidate for governor in the 1974 Republican primary. His election to Vermont's US House seat in 1974 marked the start of a long career in Congress; he served in the House for 14 years, and in the US Senate for 18.

After winning reelection in 1994 and 2000, in 2001 Jeffords left the Republican Party to become an independent, and began to caucus with the Senate's Democrats. His switch changed control of the Senate from Republican to Democratic, the first time a switch had ever changed party control of the Senate. During his Senate career, Jeffords served as chairman of the Committee on Environment and Public Works and the Committee on Health, Education, Labor, and Pensions.

Jeffords did not run for reelection in 2006 and retired at the end of his term. He was succeeded by Bernie Sanders. Jeffords retired to Shrewsbury in 2007. After the death of his wife, he moved to the Washington, D.C., area to live closer to his children. He died in 2014 from complications associated with Alzheimer's disease, and was buried in Shrewsbury.

== Background ==
Jeffords was born in Rutland, Vermont, the son of Marion (née Hausman) and Olin Merrill Jeffords, who served as Chief Justice of the Vermont Supreme Court. According to Jeffords, his mother was a relative of French architect Georges-Eugène Haussmann. Jeffords attended the public schools of Rutland, and graduated from Rutland High School in 1952. He received a Bachelor of Science degree in industrial administration from Yale University in 1956.

=== Military career ===
Jeffords was a member of the Reserve Officers' Training Corps in college, and after graduating he received his commission in the United States Navy. He then received training as a surface warfare officer, followed by assignment to USS McNair. He served for three years, and was aboard McNair when it became the first ship to enter the Suez Canal following the 1956 Suez Crisis. He was also aboard McNair as it took part in the U.S. response to the 1958 Lebanon crisis.

After completing his active duty obligation, Jeffords served in the United States Navy Reserve Among Jeffords's reserve assignments was Vermont representative for the commander of the First Naval District and liaison to prospective United States Naval Academy appointees. His later postings included legislative liaison to the U.S. Congress. He remained in the reserve until retiring as a captain in 1990.

=== Early career ===
After leaving active duty, Jeffords attended Harvard Law School, from which he graduated in 1962. During 1962 and 1963 he was a law clerk for Ernest W. Gibson Jr., Judge of the United States District Court for the District of Vermont. A longtime resident of Shrewsbury, Jeffords practiced law in Rutland and became active in politics and government as a member of the Republican Party. In the 1960s, he served as Shrewsbury's Grand Juror, Town Agent and Zoning Administrator, in addition to serving as chairman of the town's Republican committee. He also served as Rutland County's chairman of the Board of Property Tax Appeals.

=== Family ===
Jeffords married Elizabeth "Liz" Daley twice, first in 1961, which ended with a June 1978 divorce. On August 26, 1986, they married again. Liz Jeffords died on the morning of April 13, 2007, after a long struggle with ovarian cancer. Jeffords and his wife had two children, Leonard and Laura, both of whom live and work in the Washington, D.C., area. After his wife's death, Jeffords resided in Washington, D.C., a move he made in order to live near his son and daughter.

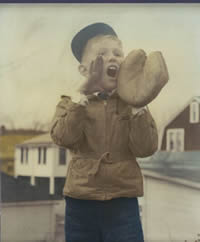
Jeffords at age seven

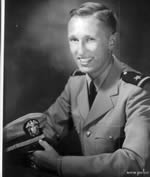
Jeffords serving in the Navy

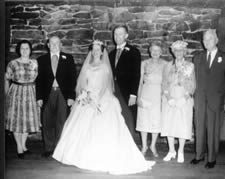
Jeffords first married his wife Elizabeth in 1961

== Political career ==
=== State politics ===
Jeffords won a seat in the Vermont Senate in 1966. During his 1967 to 1969 term, Jeffords served on the General and Judiciary Committees. He followed that success in 1968 with a victory in the race for Attorney General of Vermont. He was a presidential elector for Vermont in 1972, and voted for reelection of the Nixon–Agnew ticket. Jeffords sought the Republican Party nomination for governor in 1972, but was defeated in the primary by Luther "Fred" Hackett.

=== Congressman ===
In 1974, after winning the Republican nomination with a plurality in a three-way race, he won Vermont's sole seat in the U.S. House of Representatives, where he served for 14 years. Jeffords was a member of the Agriculture and Education and Labor Committees, and rose through seniority to become the ranking Republican on Education and Labor. Jeffords was the only Republican to vote against the Ronald Reagan tax cuts of 1981, and was a supporter of both abortion rights and expanded protections for the rights of gays and lesbians. In addition, he was recognized as a moderate-to-liberal Republican because of his pro-environment positions and his support for the National Endowment for the Arts.

Jeffords endorsed fellow moderate Republican John B. Anderson in his campaign for the 1980 Republican Party presidential primaries.

=== U.S. Senator ===
In 1988, Jeffords was elected to the U.S. Senate, and was reelected in 1994 and 2000.

Jeffords long favored expanded access to health care, and supported the plan offered by Bill Clinton in the early 1990s. In February 1998, after David Satcher was confirmed by the Senate for U.S. Surgeon General, President Clinton issued a statement thanking Jeffords and several other senators "for their strong support for this extremely qualified nominee."

He was one of only five Republican senators who voted to acquit Clinton after Clinton was impeached by the U.S. House in 1999. In October 1999, Jeffords was one of four Republicans to vote in favor of the Comprehensive Test Ban Treaty. The treaty was designed to ban underground nuclear testing and was the first major international security pact to be defeated in the Senate since the Treaty of Versailles.

Jeffords' work in Congress focused on legislation involving education, job training and individuals with disabilities. In his later years in the Senate, his emphasis shifted somewhat, as he pushed through Congress several important pieces of environmental legislations. He was, together with Paul Simon, credited by Canadian Lieutenant-General Roméo Dallaire, Force Commander of the United Nations Assistance Mission for Rwanda (UNAMIR) from 1993 to 1994, for actively lobbying the U.S. administration into mounting a humanitarian mission to Rwanda during the Rwandan genocide. According to Dallaire's book, Shake Hands with the Devil, he "owe(s) a great debt of gratitude" to both senators.

Jeffords was one of the founders of the Congressional Solar Coalition and the Congressional Arts Caucus. Jeffords was frequently recognized for his performance as a legislator, receiving Parenting magazine's "Legislator of the Year" award in 1999, and the Sierra Club's highest commendation, the John Muir Award in 2002.

During part of his tenure in the Senate, Jeffords sat at the Candy Desk.

He was one of The Singing Senators, a group of four Republican senators that also consisted of Trent Lott, Larry Craig and John Ashcroft.

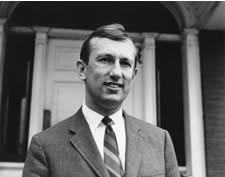
Jeffords during his tenure as a state senator

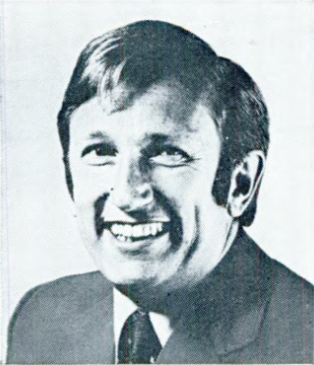
Jeffords in 1975, as a freshman congressman

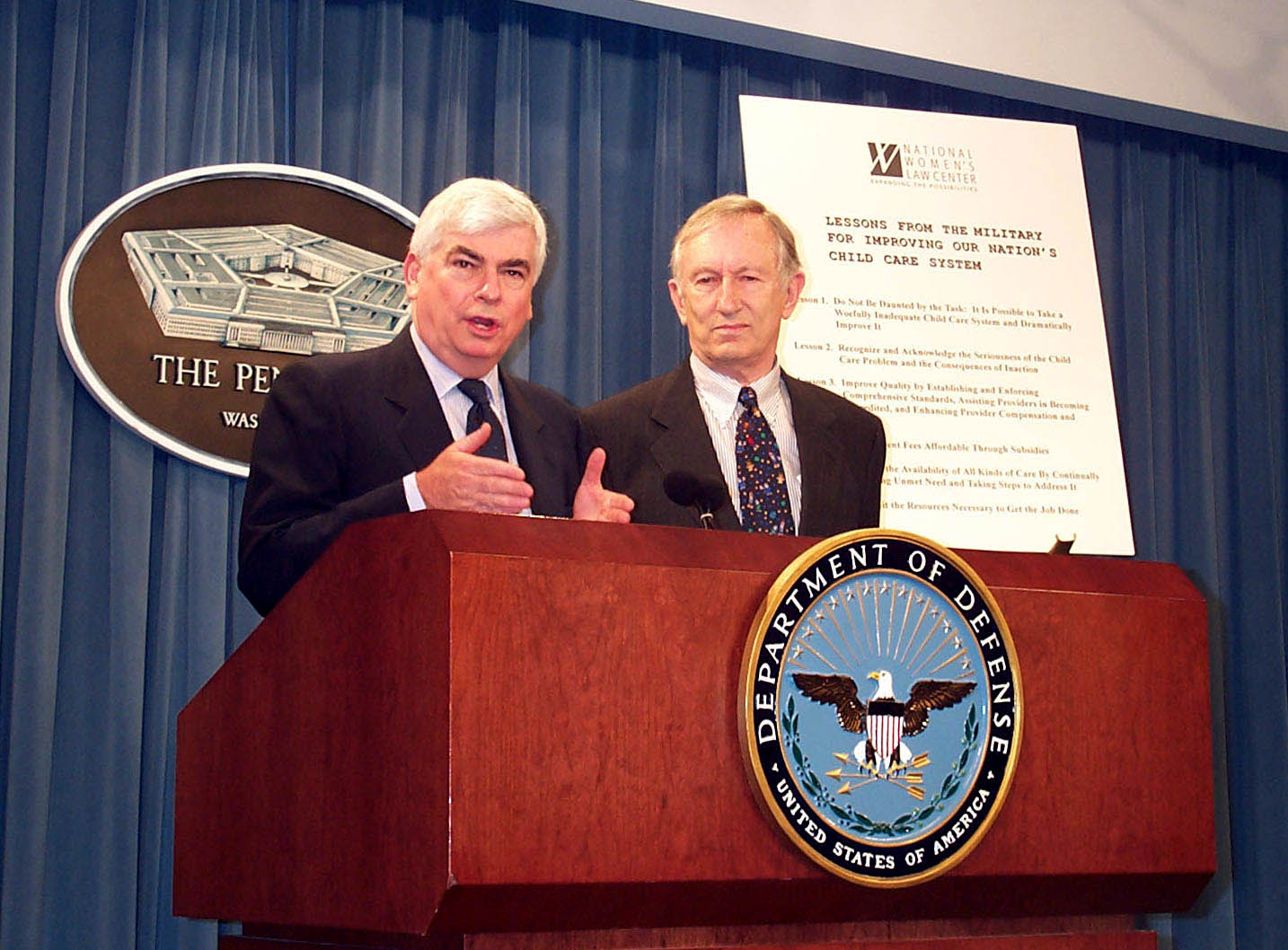
Jeffords (right) with fellow U.S. senator Chris Dodd at the Pentagon, speaking on defense issues, May 2000.

== Departure from the Republican Party ==
On May 24, 2001, Jeffords left the Republican Party, with which he had always been affiliated, and became an independent. Jeffords discussed this decision: "I will make this change and will caucus with the Democrats for organizational purposes once the conference report on the tax bill is sent to the president. I gave my word to the president that I would not intercept or try to intervene in the signing of that bill." Jeffords' opposition to the policies of the George W. Bush administration, including concerns over the size of the Bush tax cuts, motivated his party switch. Jeffords' switch was also motivated by the refusal of Senate Republicans to fully fund the Individuals with Disabilities Education Act, stating, "Increasingly, I find myself in disagreement with my party... I understand that many people are more conservative than I am and they form the Republican Party. Given the changing nature of the national party, it has become a struggle for our leaders to deal with me and for me to deal with them."

The 2000 Senate elections had left the Senate with a 50–50 split in partisan control, forcing Democrats and Republicans to negotiate an unusual power-sharing arrangement (although Republican Vice President Dick Cheney could break tie votes). Following the election, Democrats sought out a Republican to defect from the Republican caucus, which would give Democrats control of the chamber. Democratic whip Harry Reid courted Jeffords, Lincoln Chafee, and John McCain as potential party-switchers. After being promised the chairmanship of the Senate Environment and Public Works Committee to offset his loss of a committee chairmanship under Republican control, Jeffords decided to change parties, and gave up the chairmanship of the Health, Education, Labor, and Pensions Committee, which he had held since 1997. Jeffords's switch gave Democrats control of a chamber of Congress for the first time since the 1994 elections, and Jeffords is the only senator in history to tip the balance of power in the Senate by switching parties. However, the effects were not long-lasting: 18 months later, after 2002 midterms, the Senate switched back to a Republican majority.

Jeffords agreed to vote with the Democrats on all procedural matters except with permission of Reid. In return, Jeffords retained his seniority and received the committee seats that would have been available to him had he been a Democrat during his entire Senate tenure. He was free to vote as he pleased on policy matters, but more often than not voted with the Democrats.

Jeffords' party switch made him only the second Senator from Vermont to caucus with the Democrats. The seat that Jeffords occupied had been held by a Republican from 1857, when Solomon Foot joined the new party, until Jeffords became an independent in 2001.

== Senate record ==
Even before switching parties, Jeffords' voting record was moderate-to-liberal, which was typical of Republicans affiliated with Vermont's Aiken–Gibson wing. (The Aiken–Gibson wing of the Vermont Republican Party were those party activists and office holders identified with progressive policies. The party's conservatives comprised a pro-business wing, which was led by the Proctor, Fairbanks, and Smith families. In addition to Aiken and Gibson, other members of their wing of the party in the 1950s and 1960s included Jeffords and Robert Stafford. Members of the party's conservative wing included Harold J. Arthur, Lee E. Emerson, and Winston L. Prouty.)

By the time of his switch, no Republican Senator had a lower lifetime score from the American Conservative Union. In 1981, Jeffords was the only Republican member of the House to vote against a bill reducing the top tax rate from 70 per cent to 50 per cent—a hallmark of President Ronald Reagan's legacy. During his time in the Senate, he voted for the Brady Bill, the Family and Medical Leave Act of 1993, an end to the ban on gays serving in the military, and against permanent normal trade relations with China and barring affirmative action at the federal level. Jeffords was also vocal in his opposition to the nomination of Clarence Thomas to the Supreme Court of the United States by President George H. W. Bush. He was one of only two Republicans to vote against confirming Clarence Thomas. In 1993, he was the only prominent Republican to support President Clinton's unsuccessful attempt to establish a national healthcare plan. Jeffords' voting record and positions on environmental issues put further distance between himself and his Republican Party colleagues.

Jeffords consistently voted against the ban on partial-birth abortion, and also against a harsher line on Cuba. In 1995, Jeffords was one of two Republican senators, the other being Bill Frist of Tennessee, to vote in favor of confirming Dr. Henry Foster as Surgeon General; the vote failed, and Foster's confirmation was ultimately denied. In 1995 he was one of only 16 senators to vote against the Communications Decency Act. The Supreme Court later struck part of it down as unconstitutional. Jeffords advocated LGBT rights in the workplace. He sponsored The Employee Non Discrimination Act of 1995 (104th Congress), 1997 (105th Congress), and 1999 (106th Congress). Jeffords' non-discrimination bills did not include gender identity. He was in the minority of Republicans to oppose the Flag Desecration Amendment. On guns his record was mixed, despite voting for the Brady Bill and the Federal Assault Weapons Ban, he voted with gun control opponents against background checks at gun shows in 1999 and he voted with the majority of Congress for the Protection of Lawful Commerce in Arms Act. He took a more moderate line on the death penalty.

On many economic issues Jeffords was roughly in line with the majority of the Republican Party, before and after his switch: he mostly supported free-trade agreements, voted for making enforcement of consumer protection laws more difficult by moving many class-action lawsuits into federal courts, tighter bankruptcy rules and a balanced budget amendment. Even after becoming an independent, he did vote with Republicans on many major pieces of legislation. For example, Jeffords did vote against the Bipartisan Patient Protection Act, a bill supported strongly by Republican John McCain and many moderate Republicans like Olympia Snowe, Arlen Specter and Mike DeWine. Two years later he voted for the prescription drug bill, derided by many Democrats as a give away to drug companies and opposed by many conservative Republicans who opposed further federal spending, but ultimately strongly supported by President George W. Bush, and the vast majority of the Republican Party.

On October 11, 2002, Jeffords was one of 23 senators to vote against authorizing the use of military force in Iraq. Shortly after that, he was one of only nine senators to vote against the bill establishing the United States Department of Homeland Security. On November 11, 2003, Jeffords was one of only four senators to vote against the Syria Accountability and Lebanese Sovereignty Restoration Act, a bill that received strong support from politicians from across the aisle.

== Retirement and death ==
In April 2005, the 70-year-old Jeffords decided not to run for re-election in 2006 citing health issues. Jeffords said his wife's cancer and his own growing health concerns caused him to decide it was time to retire. On September 27, 2006, Jeffords delivered his farewell speech on the Senate floor. Floor speeches by and in tribute to retiring senators are a Senate tradition, but only one Republican senator, Chuck Grassley of Iowa, spoke on the floor in praise of Jeffords. After his retirement, Jeffords was succeeded in the U.S. Senate by Bernie Sanders.

Jeffords died of Alzheimer's disease on August 18, 2014, at Knollwood, a Washington, D.C., military retirement facility where he had lived for eight years. He was buried at Northam Cemetery in North Shrewsbury.

== See also ==
- List of American politicians who switched parties in office
- List of United States senators who switched parties
- The Singing Senators

Legal offices
Preceded by James L. Oakes	Attorney General of Vermont; 1969–1973	Succeeded by Kimberly B. Cheney
U.S. House of Representatives
Preceded by Richard W. Mallary	Member of the U.S. House of Representatives from Vermont's at-large congressional district 1975–1989	Succeeded by Peter Plympton Smith
Preceded by John N. Erlenborn	Ranking Member of the House Education and Labor Committee; 1985–1989	Succeeded by Bill Goodling
Party political offices
Preceded by James L. Oakes	Republican nominee for Vermont Attorney General; 1968, 1970	Succeeded by Kimberly B. Cheney
Preceded by Robert Stafford	Republican nominee for U.S. Senator from Vermont (Class 1); 1988, 1994, 2000	Succeeded by Richard Tarrant
U.S. Senate
Preceded by Robert Stafford	United States Senator (Class 1) from Vermont; 1989–2007; Served alongside: Patrick Leahy	Succeeded by Bernie Sanders
Preceded by Nancy Kassebaum	Chair of the Senate Health Committee; 1997–2001	Succeeded by Ted Kennedy
Preceded by Ted Kennedy	Ranking Member of the Senate Health Committee; 2001	Succeeded by Ted Kennedy
Preceded by Ted Kennedy	Chair of the Senate Health Committee; 2001	Succeeded by Ted Kennedy
Preceded by Bob Smith	Chair of the Senate Environment Committee; 2001–2003	Succeeded by Jim Inhofe
Preceded by Bob Smith	Ranking Member of the Senate Environment Committee; 2003–2007	Succeeded by Jim Inhofe
