= John Ashcroft =

American lawyer and politician (born 1942)

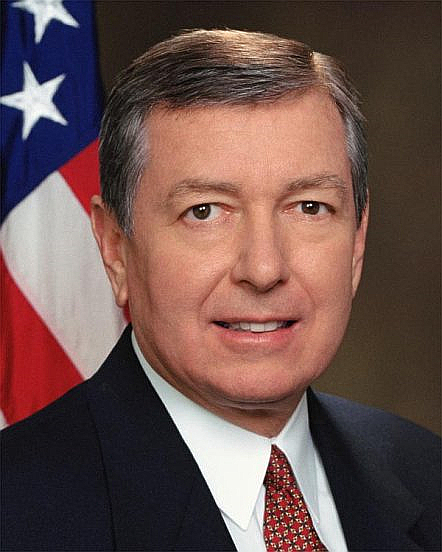
- Official portrait, 2001

79th United States Attorney General
- In office February 2, 2001 – February 3, 2005
- President: George W. Bush
- Deputy: Robert Mueller (acting); Larry Thompson; James Comey
- Preceded by: Janet Reno
- Succeeded by: Alberto Gonzales

United States Senator from Missouri
- In office January 3, 1995 – January 3, 2001
- Preceded by: John Danforth
- Succeeded by: Mel Carnahan (elect); Jean Carnahan

Chair of the National Governors Association
- In office August 20, 1991 – August 4, 1992
- Preceded by: Booth Gardner
- Succeeded by: Roy Romer

50th Governor of Missouri
- In office January 14, 1985 – January 11, 1993
- Lieutenant: Harriet Woods; Mel Carnahan
- Preceded by: Kit Bond
- Succeeded by: Mel Carnahan

38th Attorney General of Missouri
- In office December 27, 1976 – January 14, 1985
- Governor: Joseph Teasdale; Kit Bond
- Preceded by: John Danforth
- Succeeded by: William L. Webster

29th Auditor of Missouri
- In office January 8, 1973 – January 14, 1975
- Governor: Kit Bond
- Preceded by: Kit Bond
- Succeeded by: George W. Lehr

Personal details
- Born: John David Ashcroft; May 9, 1942 (age 84) Chicago, Illinois, U.S.
- Party: Republican
- Spouse: Janet Ashcroft (m. 1967)
- Children: 3, including Jay
- Education: Yale University (BA); University of Chicago (JD)
- Ashcroft's voice Ashcroft testifying before the Senate Judiciary Committee on domestic intelligence and counterterrorism reforms after 9/11. Recorded July 25, 2002

John David Ashcroft (born May 9, 1942) is an American lawyer, lobbyist, and former politician who served as the 79th United States attorney general under President George W. Bush from 2001 to 2005. A Republican from Missouri, Ashcroft represented the state in the United States Senate from 1995 to 2001, and held statewide office as the 29th auditor (1973–1975), 38th attorney general (1976–1985), and 50th governor of Missouri (1985–1993). He later founded The Ashcroft Group, a Washington D.C. lobbying firm.

Ashcroft graduated from Hillcrest High School in 1960 before receiving a Bachelor of Arts from Yale College and a J.D. from the University of Chicago Law School. After unsuccessfully running for the U.S. House of Representatives, he was appointed Missouri State Auditor in 1973, before being defeated for re-election in 1974. He then served two consecutive terms as Missouri Attorney General and as Missouri Governor (a historical first for a Republican candidate in the state). He is the only Republican to serve two full consecutive terms as governor to date. He also served one term as a U.S. Senator from Missouri until losing a race for a second term in 2000. Ashcroft had early appointments in Missouri state government, and was mentored by John Danforth. He has written several books about politics and ethics.

After George W. Bush was elected president in 2000, he selected Ashcroft to serve as U.S. Attorney General. As Attorney General, Ashcroft was a key supporter of the USA Patriot Act following the September 11 attacks and the use of torture on suspected terrorists. Ashcroft stepped down as Attorney General in February 2005, and was replaced by Alberto Gonzales. Since 2011, Ashcroft sits on the board of directors for the private military company Academi (formerly Blackwater) and is a professor at the Regent University School of Law, a conservative Christian institution affiliated with the late televangelist Pat Robertson; he has also been a member of the Federalist Society. His son, Jay Ashcroft, is also a politician who served as Secretary of State of Missouri from 2017 to 2025, before a failed bid for governor in 2024.

He was one of The Singing Senators, a group of four Republican senators that consisted of Trent Lott, Larry Craig and Jim Jeffords.

== Early life ==
John David Ashcroft was born in Chicago on May 9, 1942, the son of homemaker Grace P. (née Larsen) and minister James Robert Ashcroft. His maternal grandparents were Norwegian, while his paternal grandfather was Irish. He grew up in Willard, Missouri, where his father was a minister in an Assemblies of God congregation in nearby Springfield, served as president of Evangel University (1958–1974), and jointly as President of Central Bible College (1958–1963). Ashcroft graduated from Hillcrest High School in 1960. He attended Yale University, where he was a member of the St. Elmo Society, graduating in 1964. He received a J.D. from the University of Chicago Law School in 1967. After law school, he briefly taught Business Law and worked as an administrator at Southwest Missouri State University. During the Vietnam War, he was not drafted because he received six student draft deferments and one occupational deferment due to his teaching work.

== Missouri political career ==
=== State Auditor (1973–1975) ===
In 1972, Ashcroft ran for a congressional seat in southwest Missouri in the Republican primary election, narrowly losing to Gene Taylor. After the primary, Missouri Governor Kit Bond appointed Ashcroft to the office of State Auditor, which Bond had vacated when he became governor.

In 1974, Ashcroft was narrowly defeated for election to that post by Jackson County Executive George W. Lehr. Lehr had argued that Ashcroft, who is not an accountant, was not qualified to be the State Auditor.

=== Attorney General of Missouri (1976–1985) ===
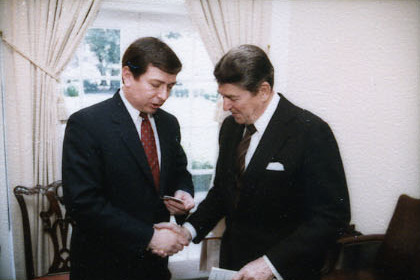
Ashcroft with President Ronald Reagan in 1984

Missouri Attorney General John Danforth, who was then in his second term, hired Ashcroft as an assistant state attorney general. In 1976, Danforth retired from the state attorney general post to run for the U.S. Senate, and Ashcroft ran to replace him. He was unopposed in the Republican primary and defeated Democrat James Baker in the general election. He was scheduled to be sworn in on January 10, 1977, but Danforth resigned from his post early ahead of his swearing in to the U.S. Senate, so Ashcroft became attorney general on December 27, 1976. In 1980, Ashcroft was re-elected with 64.5 percent of the vote, winning 96 of Missouri's 114 counties.

During his tenure, Ashcroft challenged court-ordered plans to racially integrate schools in St. Louis and Kansas City. In response to his non-compliance, the U.S. District Court for the Eastern District of Missouri threatened him with contempt of court. During his gubernatorial campaign, Ashcroft bragged that this threat was proof of his commitment to upholding racial segregation.

In 1983, Ashcroft wrote the leading amicus curiae brief in the U.S. Supreme Court Case Sony Corp. of America v. Universal City Studios, Inc., supporting the use of video cassette recorders for time shifting of television programs.

=== Governor of Missouri (1985–1993) ===
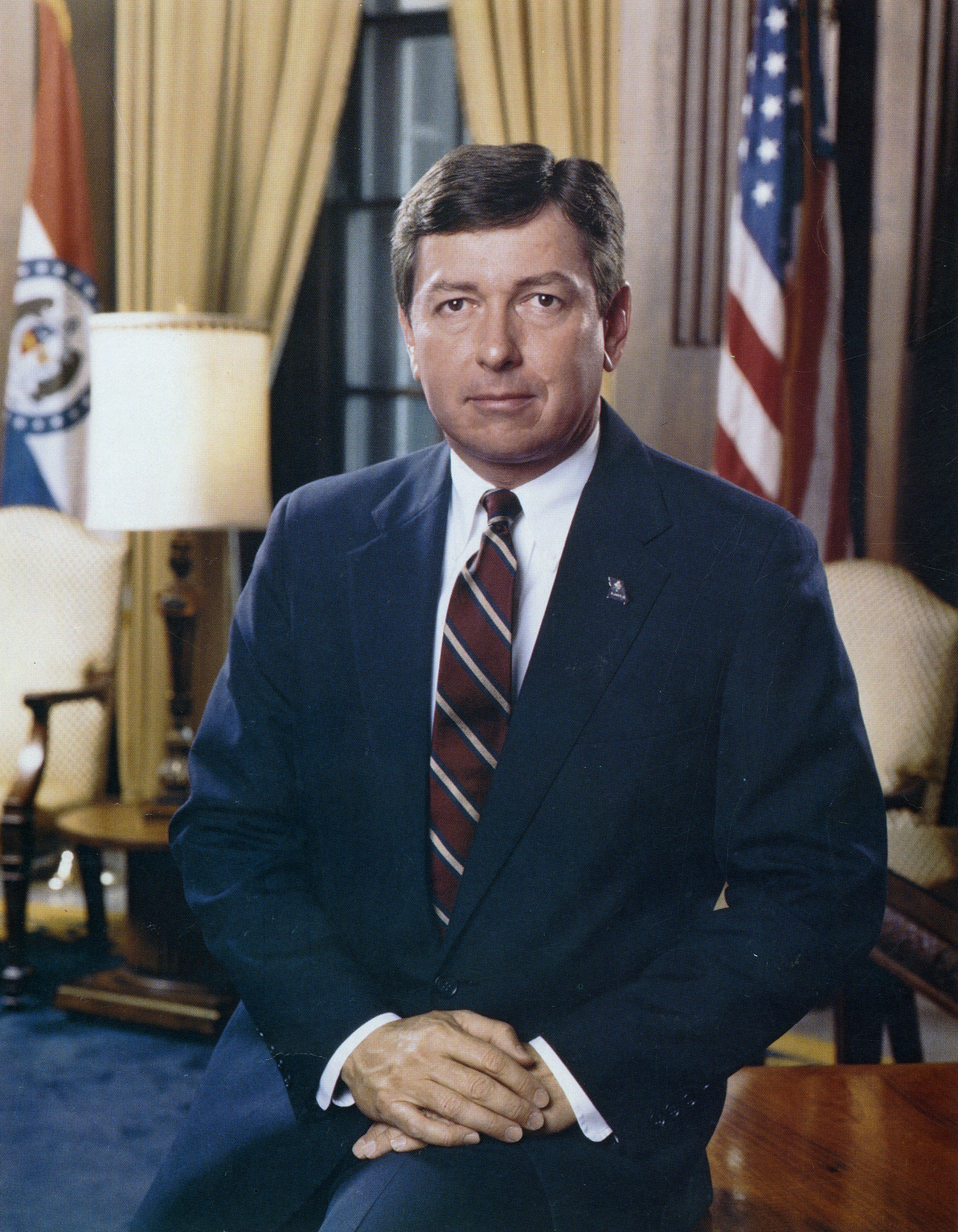
Ashcroft's official portrait as governor

Ashcroft was elected governor in 1984 and re-elected in 1988, becoming the first Republican in Missouri history elected to two consecutive terms.

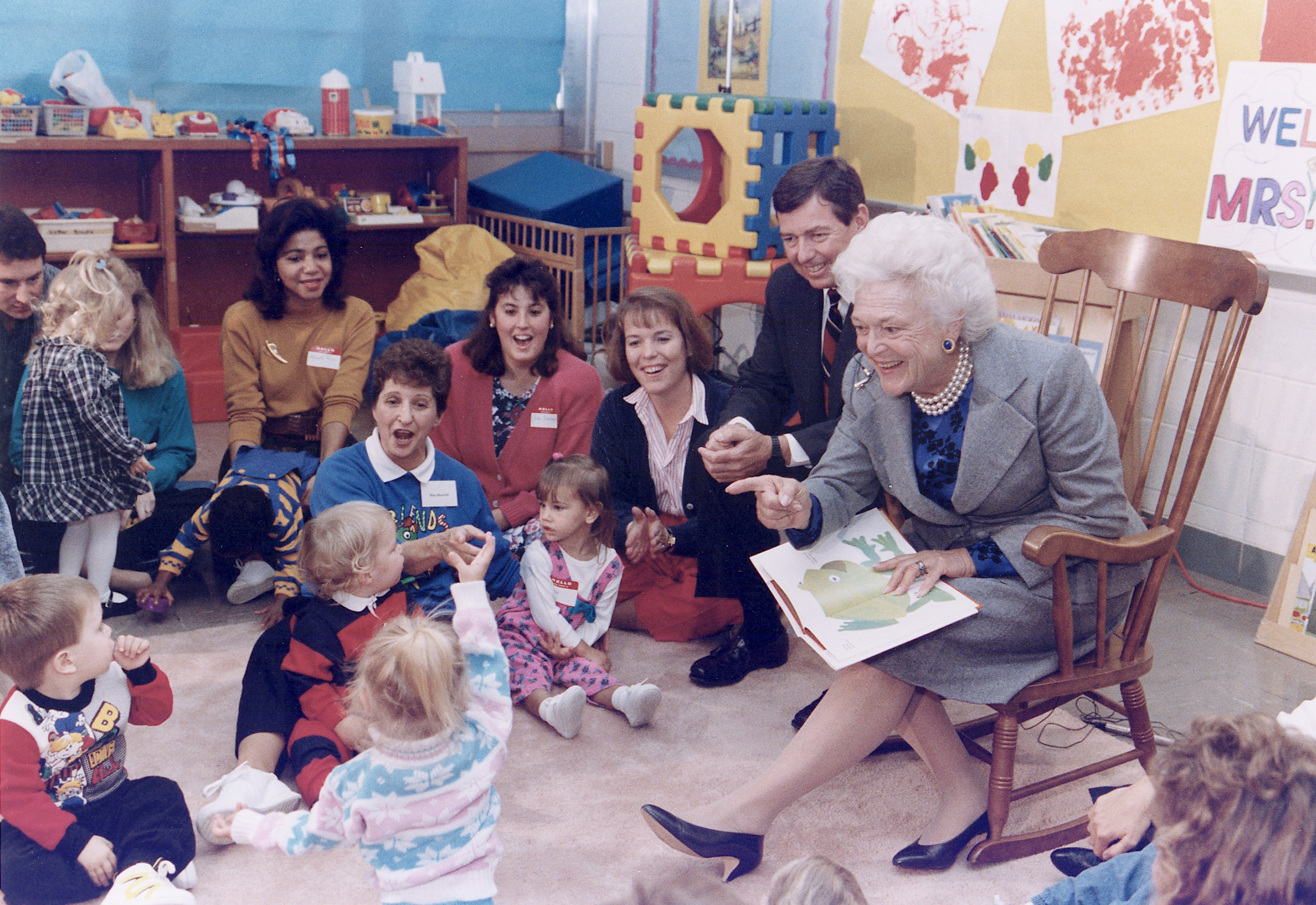
Missouri Governor John Ashcroft and First Lady Barbara Bush with a "Parents as Teachers" group at the Greater St. Louis Ferguson-Florissant School District in October 1991. Mrs. Bush (in rocking chair) is reading Brown Bear, Brown Bear to the children.

In 1984, his opponent was the Democratic Lieutenant Governor Ken Rothman. The campaign was so negative on both sides that a reporter described the contest as "two alley cats [scrapping] over truth in advertising". In his campaign ads, Ashcroft showed the contrast between his rural base and the urban supporters of his opponent from St. Louis. Democrats did not close ranks on primary night. The defeated candidate, Mel Carnahan, endorsed Rothman. In the end, Ashcroft won 57 percent of the vote and carried 106 counties—then the largest Republican gubernatorial victory in Missouri history.

In 1988, Ashcroft won by a larger margin over his Democratic opponent, Betty Cooper Hearnes, the wife of the former governor Warren E. Hearnes. Ashcroft received 64 percent of the vote in the general election—the largest landslide for governor in Missouri history since the U.S. Civil War.

During his second term, Ashcroft served as chairman of the National Governors Association (1991–92).

=== U.S. Senator from Missouri (1995–2001) ===
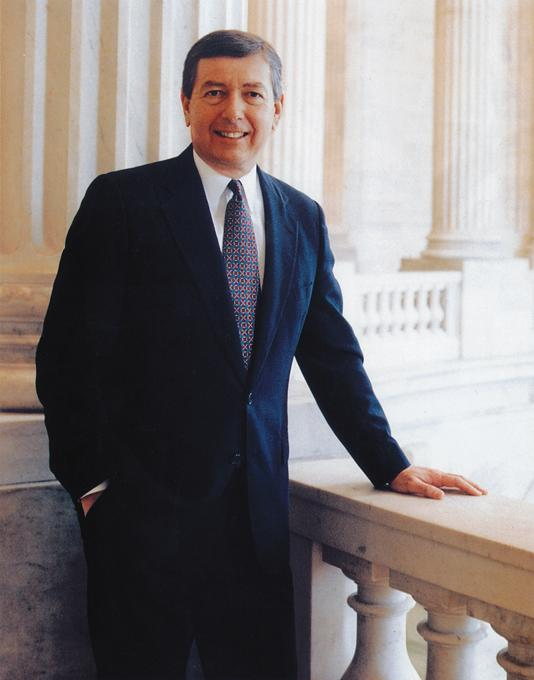
Ashcroft's official portrait as U.S. Senator

In 1994, Ashcroft was elected to the U.S. Senate from Missouri, again succeeding John Danforth, who retired from the position. Ashcroft won 59.8% of the vote against Democratic Congressman Alan Wheat. As Senator:

- He opposed the Clinton Administration's Clipper encryption restrictions, arguing in favor of the individual's right to encrypt messages and export encryption software.
- In 1999, as chair of the Senate's subcommittee on patents, he helped extend patents for several drugs, notably the allergy medication Claritin, to prevent the marketing of less-expensive generics.
- On March 30, 2000, with Senator Russ Feingold, Ashcroft convened the only Senate hearing on racial profiling. He said the practice was unconstitutional and that he supported legislation requiring police to keep statistics on their actions.

In 1998, Ashcroft briefly considered running for U.S. president, but, on January 5, 1999, he decided that he would seek re-election to his Senate seat in the 2000 election and not run for president.

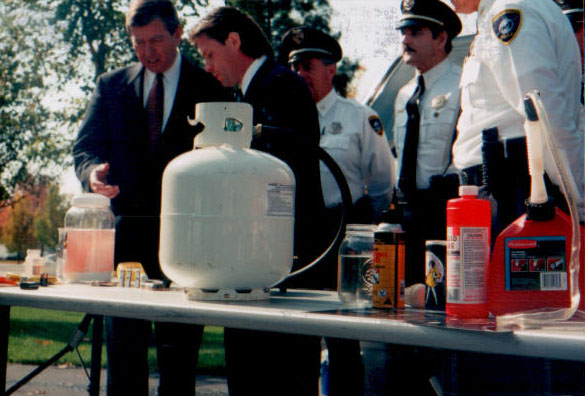
Ashcroft with Missouri law enforcement talking about Methamphetamine in 2000

In the Republican primary, Ashcroft defeated Marc Perkel. In the general election, Ashcroft faced a challenge from Governor Mel Carnahan.

In the midst of a tight race, Carnahan died in an airplane crash three weeks prior to the election. Ashcroft suspended all campaigning after the plane crash. Because of Missouri state election laws and the short time to election, Carnahan's name remained on the ballot. Lieutenant Governor Roger B. Wilson became governor upon Carnahan's death. Wilson said that should Carnahan be elected, he would appoint his widow, Jean Carnahan, to serve in her husband's place. Mrs. Carnahan stated that, in accordance with her late husband's goal, she would serve in the Senate if voters elected his name. Following these developments, Ashcroft resumed campaigning.

Carnahan won the election 51% to 49%. No politician had ever posthumously won election to the U.S. Senate, although voters had on at least three occasions chosen deceased candidates for the U.S. House of Representatives. Ashcroft remains the first and so far only U.S. Senator to have been defeated for re-election by a deceased person.

== United States Attorney General ==
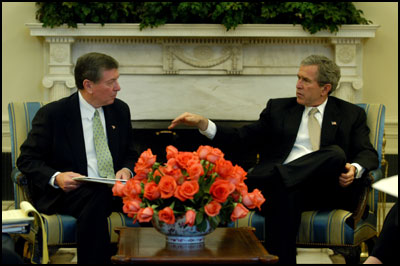
President George W. Bush meets with Attorney General John Ashcroft in the Oval Office on March 11, 2003

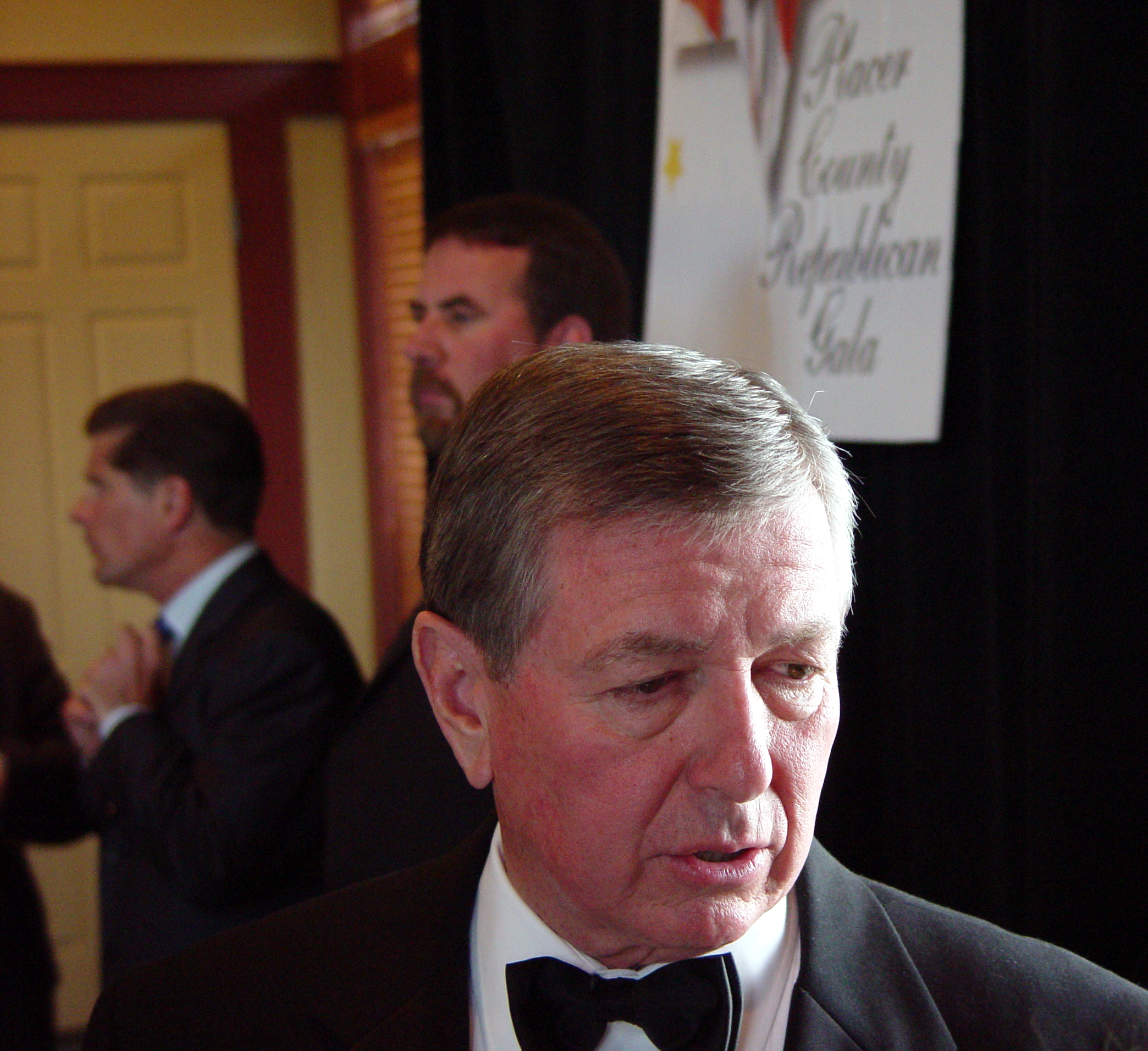
Ashcroft in 2005

In December 2000, following his Senatorial defeat, Ashcroft was chosen for the position of U.S. attorney general by president-elect George W. Bush. He was confirmed by the U.S. Senate by a vote of 58 to 42, with most Democratic senators voting against him, citing his prior opposition to using busing to achieve school desegregation and opposition to abortion. At the time of his appointment, he was known to be a member of the Federalist Society.

Before beginning his terms as Governor and Senator, Ashcroft had his father anoint him with oil to mirror the biblical practice for recognizing kings. As his father died by 2001, Ashcroft had U.S. Supreme Court Justice Clarence Thomas, his former co-worker in the Attorney General Office of Missouri, perform this anointment and administer his oath of office.

In May 2001, the FBI revealed that they had misplaced thousands of documents related to the investigation of the Oklahoma City bombing. Ashcroft granted a 30-day stay of execution for Timothy McVeigh, the perpetrator of the bombing.

In July 2001, Ashcroft began flying exclusively by private jet. When questioned about this decision, the Justice Department explained that this course of action had been recommended based on a "threat assessment" made by the FBI. Neither the Bureau, nor the Justice Department would identify the specific nature of the threat, who made it, or when it happened. The CIA were unaware of any specific threats against Cabinet members. At the time, Ashcroft was the only Cabinet appointee who traveled on a private jet, excluding the special cases of Interior and Energy who have responsibilities which require chartered jets.

After the September 11, 2001 attacks in the United States, Ashcroft was a key administration supporter of passage of the USA PATRIOT Act. One of its provisions, Section 215, allows the Federal Bureau of Investigation (FBI) to apply for an order from the Foreign Intelligence Surveillance Court to require production of "any tangible thing" for an investigation. This provision was criticized by citizen and professional groups concerned about violations of privacy. Ashcroft referred to the American Library Association's opposition to Section 215 as "hysteria" in two separate speeches given in September 2003. While Attorney General, Ashcroft consistently denied that the FBI or any other law enforcement agency had used the Patriot Act to obtain library circulation records or those of retail sales. According to the sworn testimony of two FBI agents interviewed by the 9/11 Commission, he ignored warnings of an imminent al-Qaida attack.

In January 2002, the partially nude female statue of the Spirit of Justice in the Robert F. Kennedy Department of Justice Building, where Ashcroft held press conferences, was covered with blue curtains. Department officials long insisted that the curtains were put up to improve the room's use as a television backdrop and that Ashcroft had nothing to do with it. Ashcroft's successor, Alberto Gonzales, removed the curtains in June 2005. Ashcroft also held daily prayer meetings.

In July 2002, Ashcroft proposed the creation of Operation TIPS, a domestic program in which workers and government employees would inform law enforcement agencies about suspicious behavior they encounter while performing their duties. The program was widely criticized from the beginning, with critics deriding the program as essentially a domestic informant network along the lines of the East German Stasi or the Soviet KGB, and an encroachment upon the First and Fourth amendments. The United States Postal Service refused to be a party to it. Ashcroft defended the program as a necessary component of the ongoing war on terrorism, but the proposal was eventually abandoned.

Ashcroft proposed a draft of the Domestic Security Enhancement Act of 2003, legislation to expand the powers of the U.S. government to fight crime and terrorism, while simultaneously eliminating or curtailing judicial review of these powers for incidents related to domestic terrorism. The bill was leaked and posted to the Internet on February 7, 2003.

On May 26, 2004, Ashcroft held a news conference at which he said that intelligence from multiple sources indicated that the terrorist organization, al Qaeda, intended to attack the United States in the coming months. Critics suggested he was trying to distract attention from a drop in the approval ratings of President Bush, who was campaigning for re-election.

Groups supporting individual gun ownership praised Ashcroft's support through DOJ for the Second Amendment. He said specifically, "the Second Amendment protects an individual's right to keep and bear arms," expressing the position that the Second Amendment protects an individual right, unrelated to militia service.

In March 2004, the Justice Department under Ashcroft ruled President Bush's domestic intelligence program illegal. Shortly afterward, Ashcroft was hospitalized with acute gallstone pancreatitis. White House Counsel Alberto Gonzales and Chief of Staff Andrew Card Jr. went to Ashcroft's bedside in the hospital intensive-care unit, to persuade the incapacitated Ashcroft to sign a document to reauthorize the program. Acting Attorney General James Comey alerted FBI Director Robert Mueller III of this plan, and rushed to the hospital, arriving ahead of Gonzales and Card Jr. Ashcroft, "summoning the strength to lift his head and speak", refused to sign. Attempts to reauthorize the program were ended by President Bush when Ashcroft, Comey and Mueller threatened to resign.

Following accounts of the Abu Ghraib torture and prisoner abuse scandal in Iraq, one of the torture memos was leaked to the press in June 2004. Jack Goldsmith, then head of the Office of Legal Counsel, had already withdrawn the Yoo memos and advised agencies not to rely on them. After Goldsmith chose to resign because of his objections, Ashcroft issued a one paragraph opinion re-authorizing the use of torture.

Ashcroft pushed his U.S. attorneys to pursue voter fraud cases. However, the U.S. attorneys struggled to find any deliberate voter fraud schemes, only finding individuals who made mistakes on forms or misunderstood whether they were eligible to vote.

Following George W. Bush's re-election, Ashcroft resigned, which took effect on February 3, 2005, after the Senate confirmed White House Counsel Alberto Gonzales as the next attorney general. Ashcroft said in his hand-written resignation letter, dated November 2, "The objective of securing the safety of Americans from crime and terror has been achieved."

== Consultant and lobbyist ==
In 2004, Ashcroft, while still Attorney General, sued Oracle Corporation to prevent it from acquiring a multibillion-dollar intelligence contract. In May 2005 shortly after his resignantion as AG, Ashcroft founded a consulting firm, The Ashcroft Group, LLC., which Oracle hired in 2005. With the consulting firm's help, Oracle went on to acquire the contract. As of March 2006 the firm had twenty-one clients, turning down two for every one accepted. In 2005 year-end filings, Ashcroft's firm reported collecting $269,000, including $220,000 from Oracle Corporation, which won Department of Justice approval of a multibillion-dollar acquisition less than a month after hiring Ashcroft. The year-end filing represented, in some cases, only initial payments.

According to government filings, Oracle is one of five Ashcroft Group clients that seek help in selling data or software with security applications. Another client, Israel Aircraft Industries International, is competing with Seattle's Boeing Company to sell the government of South Korea a billion dollar airborne radar system.

In March 2006, Ashcroft positioned himself as an "anti-Abramoff". In an hour-long interview, Ashcroft used the word integrity scores of times. In May 2006, based on conversations with members of Congress, key aides and lobbyists, The Hill magazine listed Ashcroft as one of the top 50 lobbyists that K Street had to offer.

By August 2006, Ashcroft's firm reportedly had 30 clients, many of which made products or technology aimed at homeland security. About a third of its client list were not disclosed on grounds of confidentiality. The firm also had equity stakes in eight client companies. It reportedly received $1.4 million in lobbying fees in the six months preceding August 2006, a small fraction of its total earnings.

After the proposed merger of Sirius Satellite Radio Inc. and XM Satellite Radio Holdings Inc., Ashcroft offered the firm his consulting services, according to a spokesman for XM. The spokesman said XM declined Ashcroft's offer. Ashcroft was subsequently hired by the National Association of Broadcasters, which is strongly opposed to the merger.

In 2011, Ashcroft became an "independent director" on the board of Xe Services (now Academi), the controversial private military company formerly known as Blackwater (Nisour Square massacre), which faced scores of charges related to weapons trafficking, unlawful force, and corruption, and had named Ted Wright as CEO in May 2011. Wright hired a new governance chief to oversee ethical and legal compliance and established a new board composed of former government officials, including former White House counsel Jack Quinn and Ashcroft. In December 2011, Xe Services rebranded to Academi to convey a more "boring" image.

The firm also has a law firm under its umbrella, called the Ashcroft Law Firm. In December 2014, the law firm was hired by convicted Russian arms trafficker Viktor Bout to overturn his 2011 conviction.

In June 2017, the Ashcroft Law firm was hired by the government of Qatar to carry out a compliance and regulatory review of Qatar's anti-money laundering and counter-terrorist financing framework, to help challenge accusations of supporting terrorism by its neighbors, following a regional blockade, as well as claims by U.S. President Donald Trump.

In June 2018, Ashcroft was reportedly hired by Najib Razak among other top U.S. lawyers to defend him in the 1MDB scandal, back in 2016. According to the document, the firm was hired to provide legal advice and counsel to Najib regarding "improper actions by third parties to attempt to destabilise the government of Malaysia". Although it is unsure whether Najib will retain the services of Ashcroft on the issue due to the United States Department of Justice's probe into 1MDB.

== Political issues ==
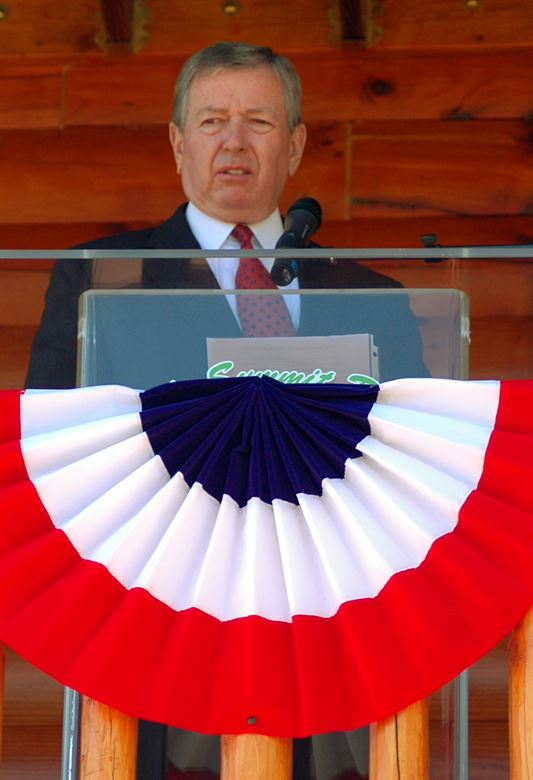
Ashcroft delivers the key note speech at the Eagles Summit Ranch dedication ceremony in 2007

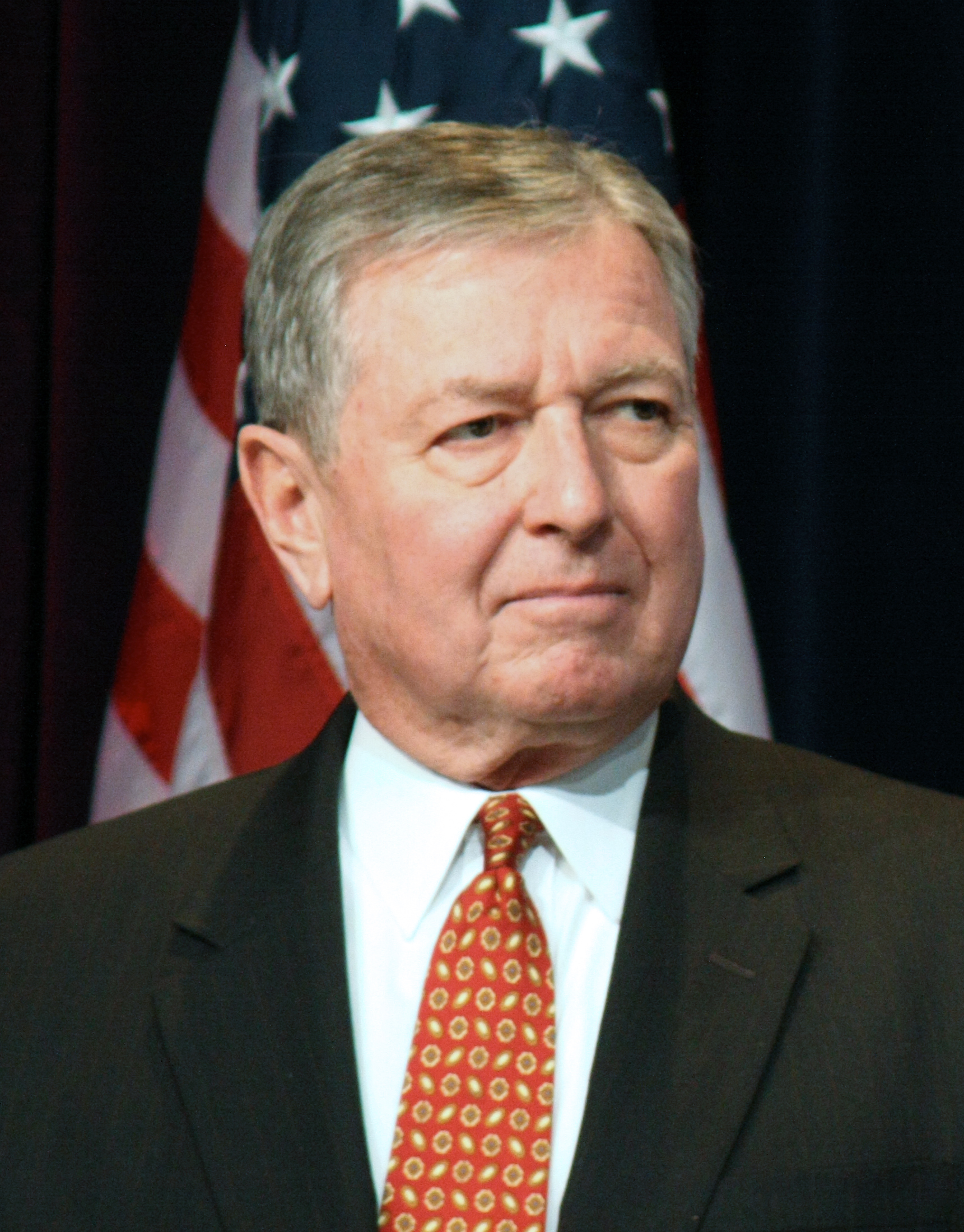
John Ashcroft at CPAC in February 2010

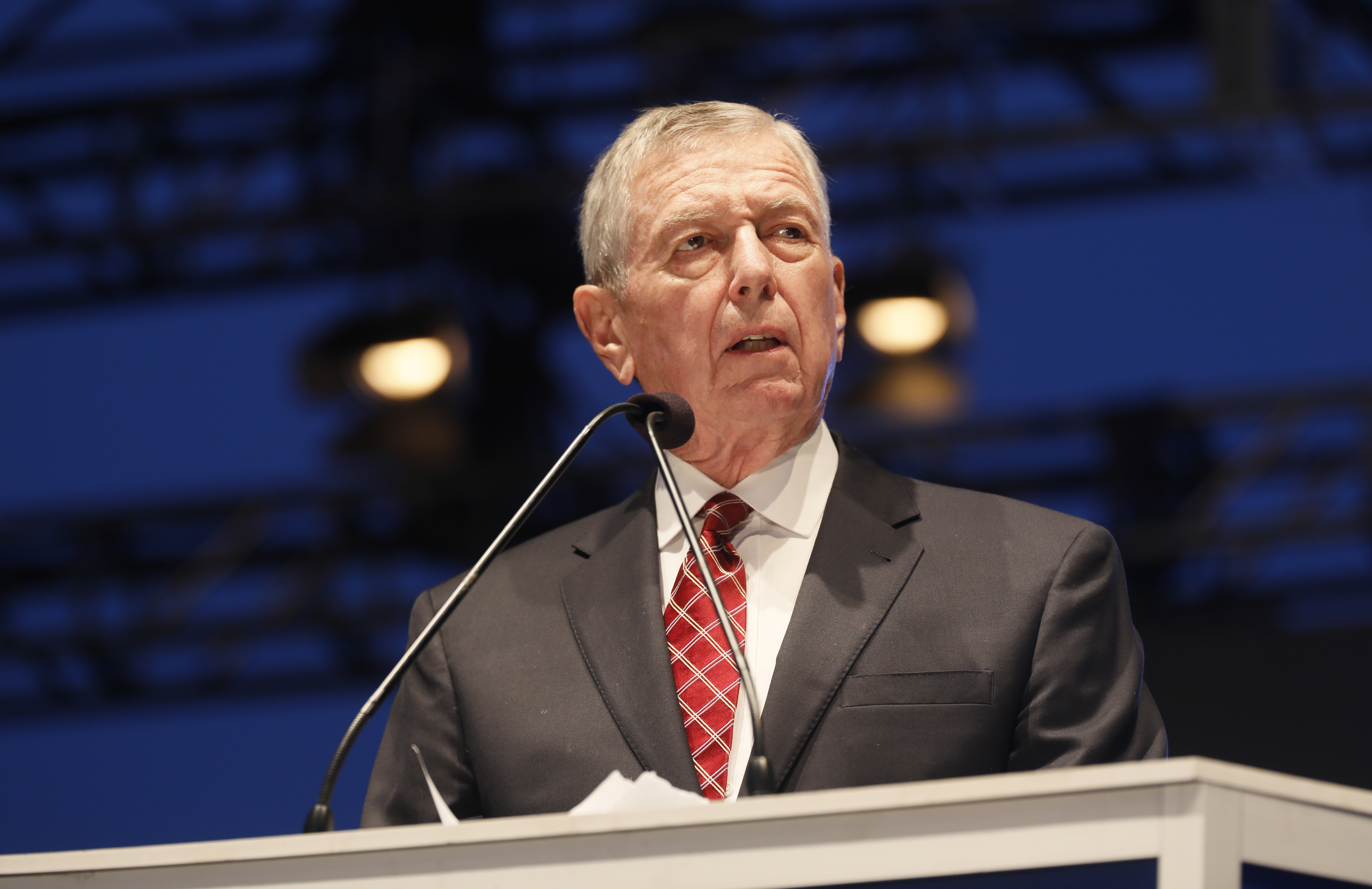
Ashcroft in 2018

In 2009 in Ashcroft v. al-Kidd, the Ninth Circuit Court of Appeals in San Francisco found that Ashcroft could be sued and held personally responsible for the wrongful detention of Abdullah al-Kidd. The American citizen was arrested at Dulles International Airport in March 2003 on his way to Saudi Arabia for study. He was held for 15 days in maximum security in three states, and 13 months in supervised release, to be used as a material witness in the trial of Sami Omar Al-Hussayen. (The latter was acquitted of all charges of supporting terrorism.) Al-Kidd was never charged and was not called as a witness in the Al-Hussayen case.

The panels court described the government's assertions under the USA Patriot Act (2001) as "repugnant of the Constitution". In a detailed and at times passionate opinion, Judge Milan Smith likened allegations against al-Kidd as similar to the repressive practices of the British Crown that sparked the American Revolution. He wrote that the government asserts it can detain American citizens "not because there is evidence that they have committed a crime, but merely because the government wishes to investigate them for possible wrongdoing". He called it "a painful reminder of some of the most ignominious chapters of our national history".

Abdullah Al-Kidd was held in a maximum security prison for 16 days, and in supervised release for 13 months. Al-Kidd was born Lavoni T. Kidd in 1973 in Wichita, Kansas. When he converted to Islam as a student at the University of Idaho, where he was a prominent football player, he changed his name. He asserts that Ashcroft violated his civil liberties as an American citizen, as he was treated like a terrorist and not allowed to consult an attorney. Al-Kidd's lawyers say Ashcroft, as US attorney general, encouraged authorities after 9/11 to arrest potential suspects as material witnesses when they lacked probable cause to believe the suspects had committed a crime.

The US Supreme Court agreed on October 18, 2010, to hear the case. On May 31, 2011, the US Supreme Court unanimously overturned the lower court's decision, saying that al-Kidd could not personally sue Ashcroft, as he was protected by limited immunity as a government official. A majority of the justices held that al-Kidd could not have won his case on the merits, because Ashcroft did not violate his Fourth Amendment rights.

Ashcroft has been a proponent of the war on drugs. In a 2001 interview on Larry King Live, Ashcroft stated his intention to increase efforts in this area. In 2003, two nationwide investigations code-named Operation Pipe Dream and Operation Headhunter, which targeted businesses selling drug paraphernalia, mostly for cannabis use, resulted in a series of indictments.

Tommy Chong, a counterculture icon, was one of those charged, for his part in financing and promoting Chong Glass/Nice Dreams, a company started by his son Paris. Of the 55 individuals charged as a result of the operations, only Chong was given a prison sentence after conviction (nine months in a federal prison, plus forfeiting $103,000 and a year of probation). The other 54 individuals were given fines and home detentions. While the DOJ denied that Chong was treated any differently from the other defendants, critics thought the government was trying to make an example of him. Chong's experience as a target of Ashcroft's sting operation is the subject of Josh Gilbert's feature-length documentary a/k/a Tommy Chong, which premiered at the 2005 Toronto International Film Festival. In a pre-sentencing brief, the Department of Justice specifically cited Chong's entertainment career as a consideration against leniency.

When Karl Rove was being questioned in 2005 by the FBI over the leak of a covert CIA agent's identity in the press (the Valerie Plame affair), Ashcroft was allegedly briefed about the investigation. The Democratic U.S. Representative John Conyers described this as a "stunning ethical breach that cries out for an immediate investigation." Conyers, the ranking Democrat on the House Judiciary Committee, asked, in a statement, for a formal investigation of the time between the start of Rove's investigation and John Ashcroft's recusal.

Since his service in government, Ashcroft has continued to oppose proposals for physician-assisted suicide, which some states have passed by referendums. When interviewed about it in 2012, when a case had reached the US Supreme Court after California voters had approved a law to permit it under regulated conditions, he said,

I certainly believe that people who are in pain should be helped and assisted in every way possible, that the drugs should be used to mitigate their pain but I believe the law of the United States of America which requires that drugs not be used except for legitimate health purposes.

In 2015, Human Rights Watch called for the investigation of Ashcroft "for conspiracy to torture as well as other crimes."

== Personal life ==
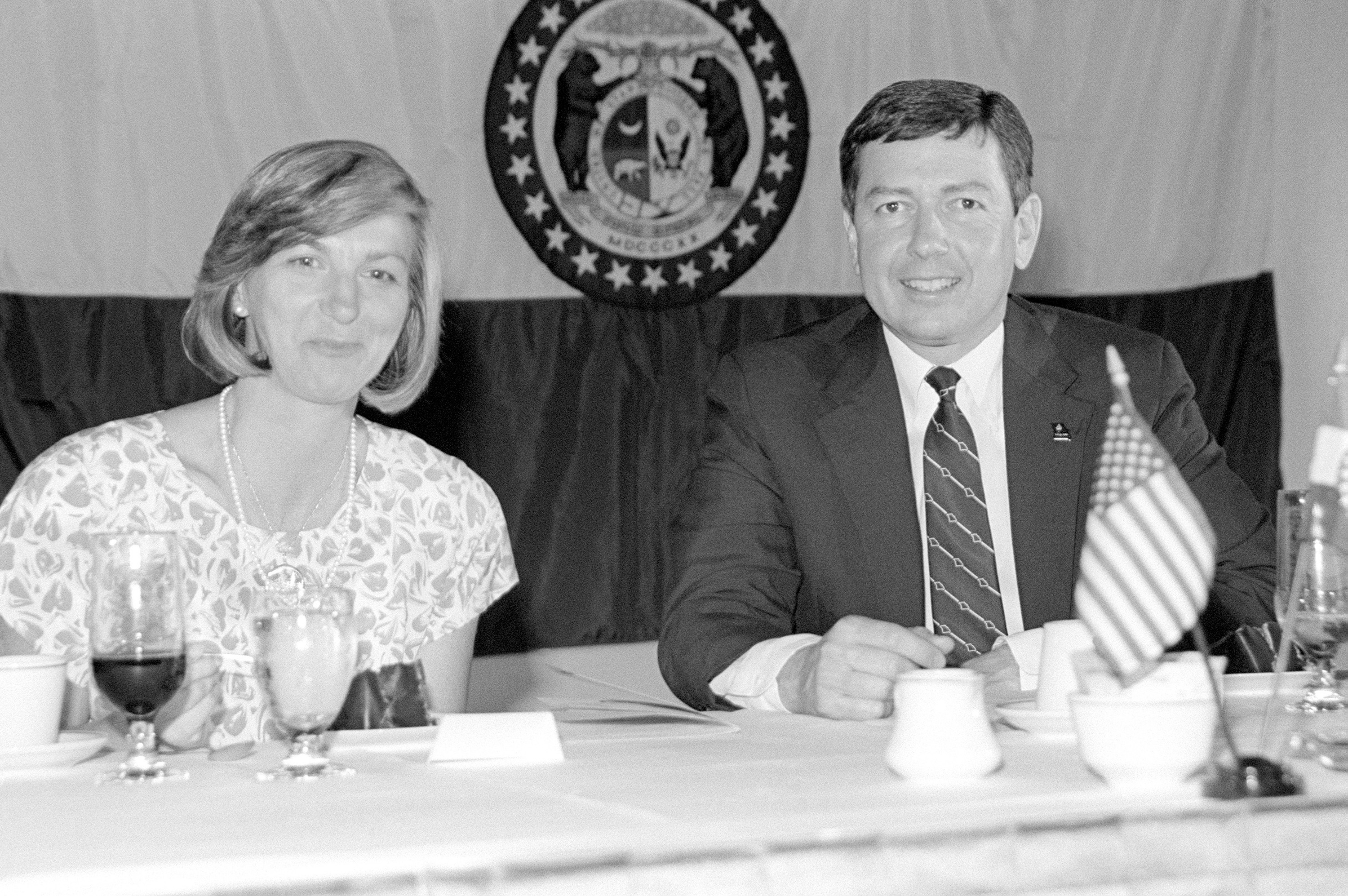
John Ashcroft and his wife, Janet, in 1986

Ashcroft is a member of the Assemblies of God church. He is married to Janet E. Ashcroft and has three children with her. His son, Jay, served as the Missouri Secretary of State from 2017 to 2025. and unsuccessfully ran for Governor himself in 2024.

Ashcroft has long enjoyed inspirational music and singing. In the 1970s, he recorded a gospel record entitled Truth: Volume One, Edition One, with Democratic Missouri legislator Max Bacon.

With fellow U.S. senators Trent Lott, Larry Craig, and Jim Jeffords, Ashcroft formed a barbershop quartet called The Singing Senators. The men performed at social events with other senators.

Ashcroft composed a paean titled "Let the Eagle Soar," which he sang at the Gordon-Conwell Theological Seminary in February 2002. Ashcroft has written and sung a number of other songs. He has collected these on compilation tapes, including In the Spirit of Life and Liberty and Gospel (Music) According to John. In 1998, he wrote a book with author Gary Thomas titled Lessons from a Father to His Son.

Ashcroft was given an honorary doctorate before delivering the commencement address at Toccoa Falls College in 2018.

Ashcroft does not drink alcohol.

== Books ==
- Co-author with Jane E. Ashcroft, College Law for Business, textbook (10th edition, 1987) ISBN 9780538129008
- On My Honor: The Beliefs that Shape My Life (1998) ISBN 9780785266433
- Lessons from a Father to His Son (1998) ISBN 9781418559441
- Never Again: Securing America and Restoring Justice (2006) ISBN 9780759568730

== Representation in other media ==
- His song, "Let the Eagle Soar", was satirically featured in Michael Moore's 2004 movie Fahrenheit 9/11 and has been frequently mocked by comedians such as David Letterman, Stephen Colbert and David Cross.
- He is in the jibjab video it’s good to be in DC
- The song was performed at Bush's 2005 inauguration by Guy Hovis, a former cast member of The Lawrence Welk Show.
- "Let the Eagle Soar" is heard in the background in the 2015 film The Big Short, as an ironic juxtaposition of schmaltzy music and new-age capitalist sensibility when a phone call is placed to pastoral Boulder, Colorado, where anti-authoritarian ex-banking trader Ben Rickert (played by Brad Pitt) lives.
- The song "Caped Crusader" off of Jello Biafra and the Melvins' 2004 album Never Breathe What You Can't See lifts several lines from Ashcroft and 9/11 hijacker Mohamed Atta in a satirical attack on religious fundamentalism.
- Immortal Technique's "Freedom of Speech" from his 2003 album Revolutionary Vol. 2 critiques Ashcroft for the invasion of Iraq under the pretense of freedom, suggesting that the real reason was racism

Political offices
Preceded by Kit Bond	Auditor of Missouri; 1973–1975	Succeeded by George Lehr
Preceded by Kit Bond	Governor of Missouri; 1985–1993	Succeeded by Mel Carnahan
Preceded by Booth Gardner	Chair of the National Governors Association; 1991–1992	Succeeded by Roy Romer
Legal offices
Preceded by John Danforth	Attorney General of Missouri; 1977–1985	Succeeded by William Webster
Preceded by Janet Reno	United States Attorney General; 2001–2005	Succeeded by Alberto Gonzales
Party political offices
Preceded by Kit Bond	Republican nominee for Auditor of Missouri; 1974	Succeeded by James Antonio
Preceded by John Danforth	Republican nominee for Attorney General of Missouri; 1976, 1980	Succeeded by William Webster
Preceded by Kit Bond	Republican nominee for Governor of Missouri; 1984, 1988	Succeeded by William Webster
Preceded by Mike Hayden	Chair of the Republican Governors Association; 1989–1990	Succeeded by Carroll Campbell
Preceded by John Danforth	Republican nominee for U.S. Senator from Missouri (Class 1); 1994, 2000	Succeeded by Jim Talent
U.S. Senate
Preceded by John Danforth	United States Senator (Class 1) from Missouri; 1995–2001; Served alongside: Kit Bond	Succeeded by Mel Carnahan; Elect
Preceded by John Danforth	United States Senator (Class 1) from Missouri; 1995–2001; Served alongside: Kit Bond	Succeeded by Jean Carnahan
U.S. order of precedence (ceremonial)
Preceded by Gale Norton as Former U.S. Cabinet Member	Order of precedence of the United States as Former U.S. Cabinet Member	Succeeded by Tommy Thompson as Former U.S. Cabinet Member
