= 1994 United States Senate election in Mississippi =

- November 8, 1994
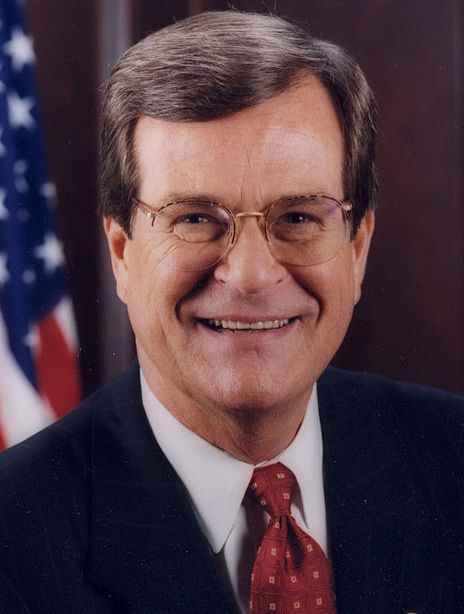

Nominee	Trent Lott	Ken Harper
Party	Republican	Democratic
Popular vote	418,333	189,752
Percentage	68.80%	31.20%
- County results Lott: 50–60% 60–70% 70–80% 80–90% Harper: 50–60% 60–70%
U.S. senator before election
Trent Lott
Republican
Elected U.S. Senator
Trent Lott
Republican

The 1994 United States Senate election in Mississippi was held November 7, 1994. Incumbent Republican U.S. Senator Trent Lott won re-election to a second term.

== Major candidates ==
=== Democratic ===
- Ken Harper, former State Senator and Attorney
- Shawn O'Hara

=== Republican ===
- Trent Lott, incumbent U.S. Senator

== Results ==
General election results
Party	Candidate	Votes	%
Republican	Trent Lott (Incumbent)	418,333	68.80%
Democratic	Ken Harper	189,752	31.20%
Republican hold			

== See also ==
- 1994 United States Senate elections
