= Guy Hovis =

American popular music singer (1941–2026)

- Born: Guy Lee Hovis, Jr. September 24, 1941; Tupelo, Mississippi, U.S.
- Died: January 22, 2026 (aged 84) Oxford, Mississippi, U.S.
- Genres: Southern Gospel, Big Band, Popular, Country
- Occupations: Vocalist; Political staffer
- Years active: 1967–2026
- Website: Official website

Guy Lee Hovis Jr. (September 24, 1941 – January 22, 2026) was an American singer, who, along with his former wife, Ralna English, a native of West Texas, was one of the featured acts on both the ABC and syndicated versions of The Lawrence Welk Show.

== Life and career ==
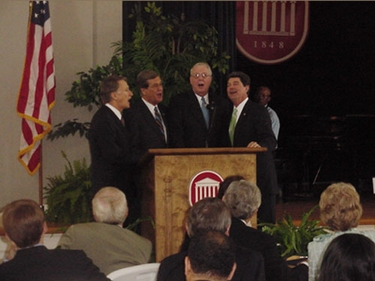
Hovis singing with Gaylen Roberts, Trent Lott, and Allen Pepper in 2004

Born and reared in Tupelo, Mississippi, Hovis was the son of an officer from the Mississippi Highway Patrol. He graduated with a Bachelor of Science degree from the University of Mississippi at Oxford. After a two-year stint in the United States Army, Hovis decided to try a career as a musical performer in Hollywood.

Hovis had his first break with an appearance on the CBS House Party television program hosted by Art Linkletter; thereafter, he teamed with David Blaylock as the singing duo of Guy & David, which led to a recording contract with ABC Records.

After the duo disbanded, Hovis was a soloist again, performing in Los Angeles nightclubs such as The Horn in Santa Monica, California; it was there he met his future wife and singing partner Ralna English. The couple wed in January 1969.

Later in 1969, Ralna joined The Lawrence Welk Show as a solo singer; by the time the Christmas episode was filmed, Ralna convinced Welk to have Hovis on the show to sing a duet with her. He agreed, and the initial appearance, singing "Little Toy Trains", led to Hovis becoming a regular member of the cast.

On October 30, 1977, Ralna and Guy adopted (mentioned on an episode of Tattletales) their daughter, Julie, who was to become an elementary schoolteacher.

For the next twelve years, Guy & Ralna were one of the most popular acts on the show. Part of the appeal of their act was the portrayal of Guy and Ralna as a happily married couple. After the series ended in 1982, Hovis continued to perform and added the duties of songwriter and record producer.

Hovis and English divorced in 1984 after fifteen years of marriage, but they still performed together occasionally in concert venues.

Hovis also performed with such entertainers as Dinah Shore and Jim Nabors and was a guest on the Johnny Carson, Merv Griffin, Joey Bishop, and Mike Douglas programs. In 1986, he launched a Christian music ministry and performed throughout the country in churches and other public gatherings.

Hovis sang the title song "Too Many Yesterdays" for the Disney film Benji the Hunted (1987).

From 1990 to 2007, Hovis served as state director for former U.S. Senator Trent Lott. Hovis and Lott had been friends since their college days at Ole Miss.

Hovis continued to perform at the Lawrence Welk Resort in Branson, Missouri, for pledge specials on PBS, or with Ralna at state fairs, concert halls, and casinos.

In 2002, Hovis married Sarah "Sis" Lundy, and the couple resided in the capital city of Jackson, Mississippi.

On 20 January 2005, Hovis sang "Let the Eagle Soar", a song written by then United States Attorney General John Ashcroft of Missouri, at the second inauguration of U.S. President George W. Bush.

Hovis died in Oxford, Mississippi, on January 22, 2026, at the age of 84.

== See also ==
- Ralna English
