= Ralna English =

American singer

- Born: Ralna Eve English; June 19, 1942 (age 83)
- Origin: Haskell, Texas, USA
- Genres: Southern gospel, big band, pop, country
- Occupation: Vocalist
- Years active: 1969–present
- Website: Ralna English.com

Ralna Eve English is an American singer (born June 19, 1942) from Haskell, Texas. She gained fame as half of the husband-and-wife singing duo of Guy & Ralna with then-husband Guy Hovis, both of whom were featured performers on The Lawrence Welk Show.

== Early life ==
English was raised in Lubbock, Texas where, as a teenager, she won a local battle of the bands competition with her group "Ralna and the Ad-Libs." One of her competitors was legendary rock star Buddy Holly, a Lubbock native. After attending Texas Tech University, and singing jingles for television commercials in Dallas, she relocated to California in the late 1960s, where she performed regularly at The Horn nightclub in Santa Monica.

== Career ==
While working at The Horn nightclub, English met fellow aspiring performer Guy Hovis, a native of Mississippi. They were married on January 25, 1969.

Later that year, she joined Lawrence Welk on his television program originally as a soloist. In the first year, husband Guy joined the program, and for the next thirteen years, until the show ended its run in 1982, Guy & Ralna became one of the most popular acts on the show.

In March 2007, English's solo TV special, Ralna English: From My Heart premiered nationally on PBS. In the special, a fundraiser for PBS, she performed with a 75-piece orchestra and 100-voice choir.

In 2007, English published a "Ralna English Family Cookbook," which was offered to viewers who purchased DVDs of her TV special. Recipes are from her two sisters, aunts, grandmother, mother and other relatives.
