= 1980 Missouri Attorney General election =

- November 4, 1980
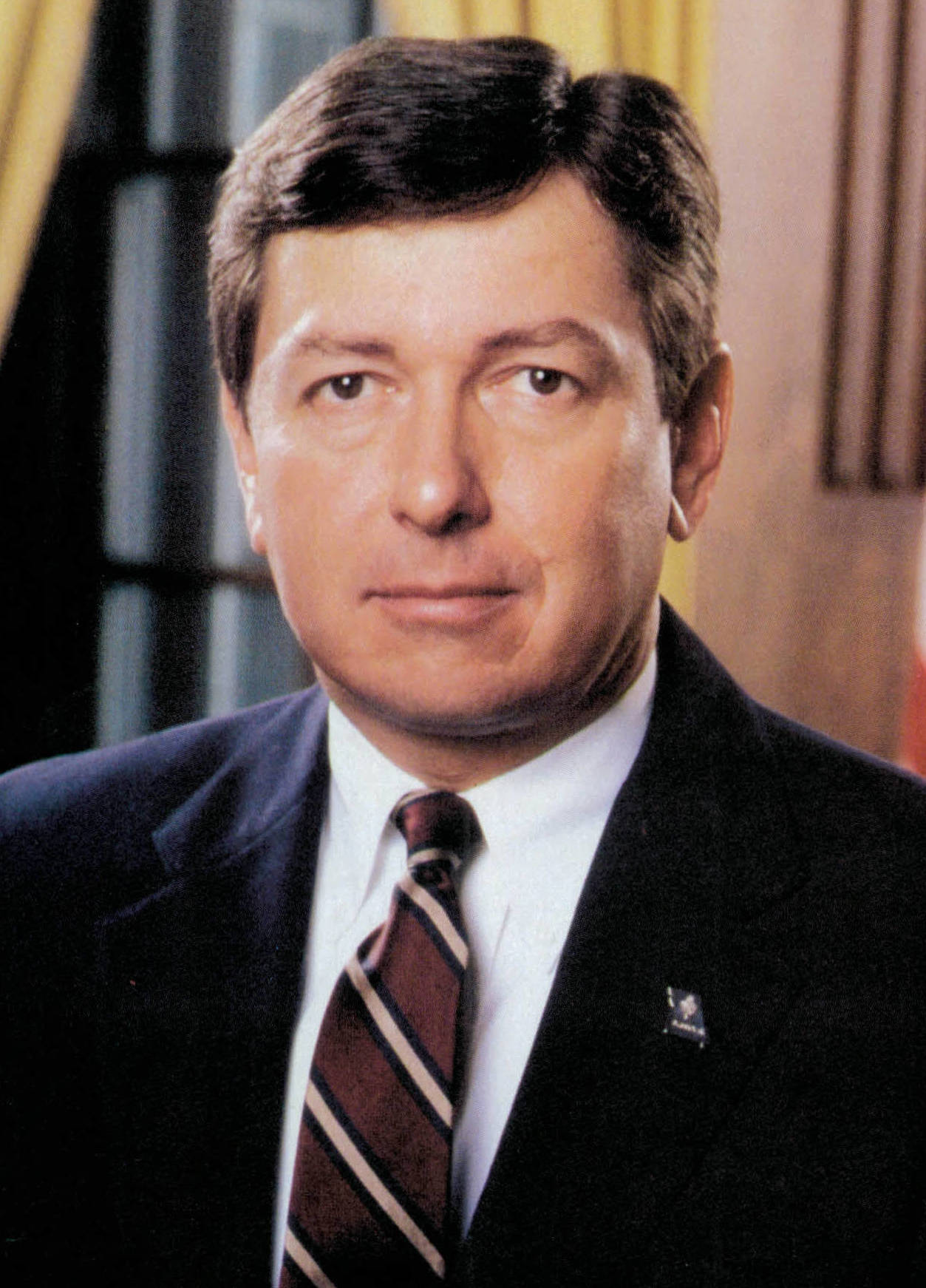

Nominee	John Ashcroft	Robert Baine
Party	Republican	Democratic
Popular vote	1,298,741	716,300
Percentage	64.45%	35.55%
Attorney General before election
John Ashcroft
Republican
Elected Attorney General
John Ashcroft
Republican

The 1980 Missouri Attorney General election was held on November 4, 1980, in order to elect the attorney general of Missouri. Republican nominee and incumbent attorney general John Ashcroft defeated Democratic nominee Robert Baine.

== General election ==
On election day, November 4, 1980, Republican nominee John Ashcroft won re-election by a margin of 582,441 votes against his opponent Democratic nominee Robert Baine, thereby retaining Republican control over the office of attorney general. Ashcroft was sworn in for his second term on January 12, 1981.

=== Results ===
Missouri Attorney General election, 1980
Party	Candidate	Votes	%
Republican	John Ashcroft (incumbent)	1,298,741	64.45
Democratic	Robert Baine	716,300	35.55
Total votes		2,015,041	100.00
Republican hold			

== See also ==
- 1980 Missouri gubernatorial election
