= Herding Cats: A Life in Politics =

2005 book written by U.S. Senator Trent Lott

- Author: Trent Lott
- Language: English
- Subject: Politics
- Publisher: HarperCollins Publishers, Inc
- Publication place: United States
- English publication date: 2005
- Pages: 320 pages

Herding Cats: A Life in Politics is a 2005 book written by U.S. Senator Trent Lott, a Republican from Mississippi. Published by HarperCollins Publishers, Inc. on August 23, 2005, it is an autobiography.

== Content ==
The major points of the book are Lott's childhood in Grenada and Pascagoula, Mississippi, including his struggles with his alcoholic father; his election to Congress; his years in the House of Representatives during the Nixon, Carter, and Reagan administrations (including his service as Minority Whip in that body); and his service in the Senate, especially his service as Majority Leader during the Clinton and Bush Administrations. He recounts the formative events of his youth and the stories from his political life. From his decision to support Gerald Ford over Ronald Reagan in the 1976 Republican primary to his working partnership with Senate Democratic leader Tom Daschle during the Clinton impeachment and the September 11 attacks in 2001, Lott traces the inner workings of congressional life.

One major focus of the book is the comments Lott made at the birthday party of Sen. Strom Thurmond in 2002 and the subsequent intense media coverage, which eventually led to his resignation as the Senate Majority Leader in December 2002. Lott names several figures who he believes orchestrated his downfall, including members of President George W. Bush's administration, such as then-Secretary of State, Colin Powell, and former Federal Emergency Management Agency (FEMA) head Joe Allbaugh (who Lott claims has admitted that he intended to bring Lott down as Majority Leader); as well as the successor to Lott as Majority Leader, Senator Bill Frist.

Lott suggests that his forced resignation was a "strategic plan" devised by Bush and others who wanted Frist to take his place, since Frist supported key White House policies like the Medicare expansion, which Lott opposed. Lott notes, however, that his response to the Thurmond controversy played poorly in the media.

Lott wrote in the book that Frist betrayed him by not telling him about Frist's decision to run for majority leader beforehand. Lott says he took Frist as his protégé, as Frist had no political/public experience when he was first elected to the Senate.

Some suggested that Lott's book, which portrayed Frist in a negative light, was designed to impede Frist's possible presidential campaign, but Frist did not run. Lott indicated in the book that he had repaired his relationship with Frist to some extent.

Lott also emphasizes his years as Minority Whip in the House and his years as Majority Leader in the Senate, where Lott claims to have built an efficient vote-getting organization and played a key role in several legislative accomplishments, including the Reagan-era budget cuts and tax cuts, and welfare reform and the tobacco settlement during the Clinton years.

After the White House publicly distanced itself from Lott over the comment, Lott wrote in the book that Bush's cold shoulder was "devastating ... booming and nasty." He wrote about resigning as Senate leader in the book, "True, I'd been knifed in the back. But in order to become effective again, I had to shake some of the hands that held the daggers." The book covers him becoming majority leader in 1996, succeeding Bob Dole.

== Reception ==
Said Shailagh Murray of The Washington Post, "Trent Lott has written an interesting book. Whether he realizes why is another matter." Further writes Murray, "What is most revealing in the book is Lott's inability to acknowledge the deeply offensive implications of his tribute. He continues to defend it as a harmless slip of the tongue and blames the media for stirring the outcry that eventually forced him to relinquish his leadership post."

According to Salon, the biography includes Lott remaining "embittered" over criticism he took in 2002 after racially insensitive remarks, with Lott accusing Frist of engaging in a "power grab" during the incident, despite Lott claiming Frist was "my protege." He also claims President George Bush didn't show him support during the incident, with Lott criticizing the Bush administration's conduct in Iraq.
