= Trent Lott =

American lawyer and politician (born 1941)

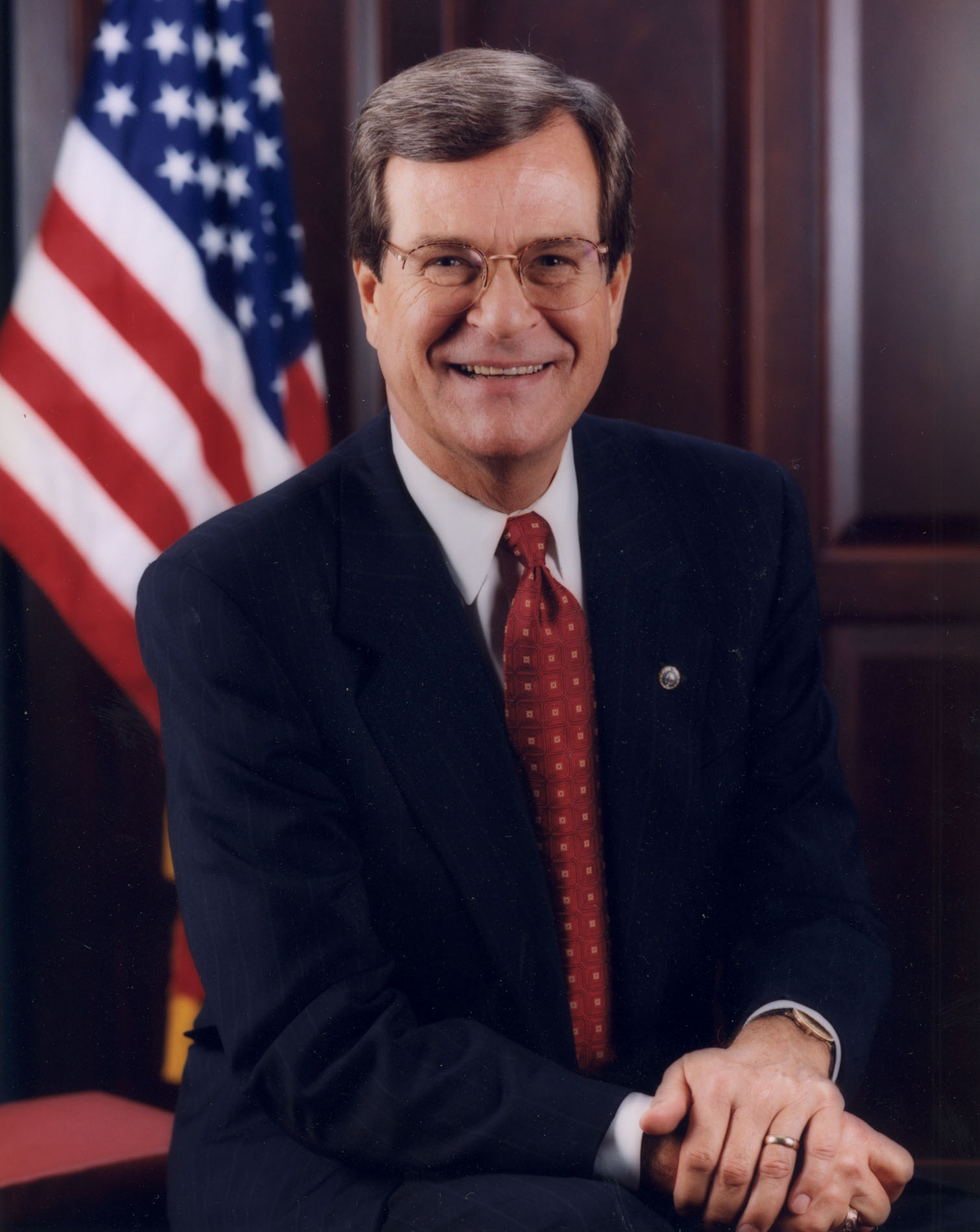
- Official portrait, c. 2000

Senate Majority Leader
- In office January 20, 2001 – June 6, 2001
- Deputy: Don Nickles
- Preceded by: Tom Daschle
- Succeeded by: Tom Daschle
- In office June 12, 1996 – January 3, 2001
- Preceded by: Bob Dole
- Succeeded by: Tom Daschle

United States Senator from Mississippi
- In office January 3, 1989 – December 18, 2007
- Preceded by: John C. Stennis
- Succeeded by: Roger Wicker
Senate positions
Senate Minority Leader
In office June 6, 2001 – January 3, 2003
Deputy	Don Nickles
Preceded by	Tom Daschle
Succeeded by	Tom Daschle
In office January 3, 2001 – January 20, 2001
Deputy	Don Nickles
Preceded by	Tom Daschle
Succeeded by	Tom Daschle
Senate Minority Whip
In office January 3, 2007 – December 18, 2007
Leader	Mitch McConnell
Preceded by	Dick Durbin
Succeeded by	Jon Kyl
Leader of the Senate Republican Conference
In office June 12, 1996 – January 3, 2003
Deputy	Don Nickles
Preceded by	Bob Dole
Succeeded by	Bill Frist
Senate Majority Whip
In office January 3, 1995 – June 12, 1996
Leader	Bob Dole
Preceded by	Wendell Ford
Succeeded by	Don Nickles

House Minority Whip
- In office January 3, 1981 – January 3, 1989
- Leader: Robert H. Michel
- Preceded by: Robert H. Michel
- Succeeded by: Dick Cheney

Chair of the House Republican Research Committee
- In office January 3, 1979 – January 3, 1981
- Leader: John Jacob Rhodes
- Preceded by: Bill Frenzel
- Succeeded by: Ed Madigan

Member of the U.S. House of Representatives from Mississippi's 5th district
- In office January 3, 1973 – January 3, 1989
- Preceded by: William M. Colmer
- Succeeded by: Larkin I. Smith

Personal details
- Born: Chester Trent Lott; October 9, 1941 (age 85) Grenada, Mississippi, U.S.
- Party: Democratic (before 1972); Republican (1972–present)
- Spouse: Patricia Thompson (m. 1964)
- Children: 2
- Education: University of Mississippi (BA, JD)
- Lott's voice Lott speaks on U.S. policy towards Saddam Hussein's Iraq. Recorded February 12, 1998

Chester Trent Lott Sr. (born October 9, 1941) is an American lobbyist, lawyer, author, and politician who represented Mississippi in the United States House of Representatives from 1973 to 1989 and in the United States Senate from 1989 to 2007. Lott served in numerous leadership positions in both chambers of Congress as one of the first of a wave of Republicans winning seats in Southern states that had been solidly Democratic. Later in his career, he served twice as Senate Majority Leader, and also, alternately, Senate Minority Leader. In 2003, he stepped down from the position after controversy due to his praising of Strom Thurmond's segregationist presidential bid.

From 1968 to 1972, Lott was an administrative assistant to Representative William M. Colmer of Mississippi, who was also the chairman of the House Rules Committee. Lott switched parties from being a conservative Democrat to a Republican when he won Colmer's former seat in the House of Representatives, upon Colmer's retirement. In 1988, Lott ran successfully for the U.S. Senate to replace another retiree, John C. Stennis. After Republicans took the majority in the Senate, Lott became Senate Majority Whip in 1995 and then Senate Majority Leader in 1996, upon the resignation of presidential nominee Bob Dole of Kansas. Following GOP losses in the 2000 Senate races that resulted in a 50–50 split, Lott briefly became Senate Minority Leader, as Democrat Al Gore was still Vice President and President of the Senate (Note: In the event of a tie vote on the Senate floor, the constitution states that the Vice President casts the deciding vote.) at the beginning of the new term on January 3, 2001. Seventeen days later, Lott was restored as Senate Majority Leader after Republicans regained control of the chamber upon the inauguration of the new vice president, Dick Cheney, on January 20. Lott was Senate Majority Leader until June 6, 2001, when Vermont Senator Jim Jeffords changed his party affiliation from Republican to Independent, and caucused with the Senate Democrats for the remainder of his term. Thereafter, Lott again served as Senate Minority Leader.

Following Republican gains in the 2002 midterm elections, Lott was slated to again become Majority Leader when the next Senate session began in January 2003. However, on December 20, 2002, after significant controversy following comments he made regarding Thurmond's presidential candidacy, Lott resigned as Senate Minority Leader.

Though no longer in leadership, Lott remained in the Senate until resigning in 2007. Fellow Republican Roger Wicker won the 2008 special election to replace him. Lott became a lobbyist, co-founding the Breaux–Lott Leadership Group. The firm was later acquired by law and lobbying firm Patton Boggs. Lott serves as a Senior Fellow at the Bipartisan Policy Center (BPC), where he focuses on issues related to energy, national security, transportation and congressional reforms. Lott is also a co-chair of BPC's Energy Project. In June 2020 Lott was fired from the Washington law and lobbying firm Squire Patton Boggs while negotiating to join another firm. Days later on June 15, 2020, Lott joined Crossroads Strategies along with his longtime colleague John Breaux.

He was one of The Singing Senators, a group of four Republican senators that also consisted of Jim Jeffords, Larry Craig and John Ashcroft.

== Early life ==
Lott was born in Grenada, Mississippi, and lived his early years in nearby Duck Hill, where his father, Chester Paul Lott, sharecropped a stretch of cotton field. Lott's mother, the former Iona Watson, was a schoolteacher. Lott's father was a philanderer with a drinking problem, and Lott frequently acted as a mediator when his mother threatened his father with divorce. When Lott was in the sixth grade, the family moved to Pascagoula, where Lott's father worked at a shipyard.

Lott attended college at the University of Mississippi in Oxford, where he obtained an undergraduate degree in public administration in 1963 and a Juris doctor degree in 1967. He served as a field representative for Ole Miss and was president of his fraternity, Sigma Nu. Lott was also an Ole Miss cheerleader, on the same team with future U.S. Senator Thad Cochran. At the time that Lott was president, the Sigma Nu fraternity house was raided by the troops from the 716th Battalion during the "Battle of Oxford". They discovered a sizeable weapon cache.

Regarding his education, the Congressional Record from 1999 quotes Senator Lott declaring: "I am a product of public education from the first grade through the second, third, and fourth grades where I went to school at Duck Hill, Mississippi, and I had better teachers in the second, third, and fourth grades in Duck Hill, Mississippi, than I had the rest of my life."

While an undergraduate at the University of Mississippi, Lott participated in the effort at the 1964 national convention of the Sigma Nu fraternity to oppose a civil rights amendment proposed by the Dartmouth College and Duke University chapters to end mandatory racial exclusion by the fraternity. Lott sided with the segregationists who defeated the amendment. The Dartmouth chapter subsequently seceded from the fraternity, and Sigma Nu remained whites-only until later in the decade.

== U.S. House of Representatives ==
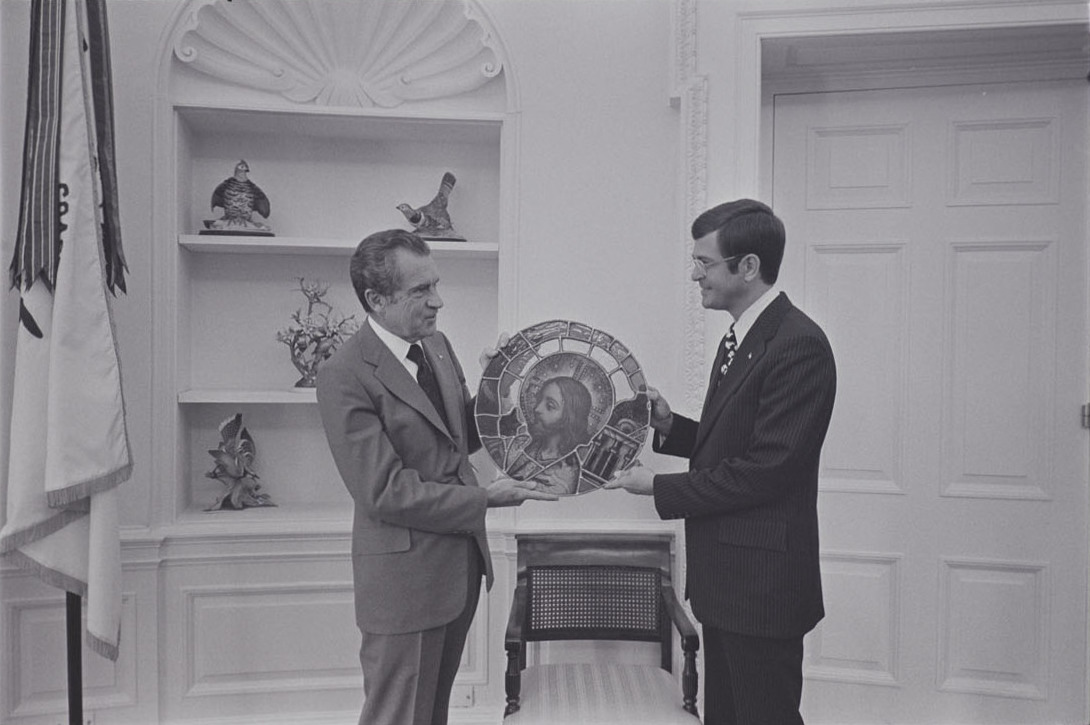
Lott with President Richard Nixon in 1973

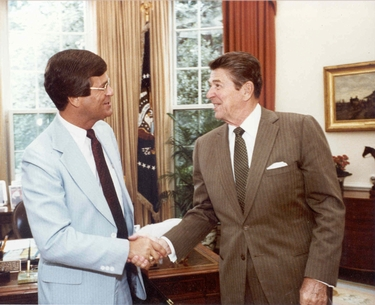
Lott with President Ronald Reagan in 1982

Lott served as administrative assistant to House Rules Committee chairman William M. Colmer, also of Pascagoula, from 1968 to 1972.

In 1972, Colmer, one of the most conservative Democrats in the House, announced his retirement after 40 years in Congress. He endorsed Lott as his successor in Mississippi's 5th District, located in the state's southern tip, even though Lott ran as a Republican. Lott won handily, in large part due to Richard Nixon's landslide victory in that year's presidential election. Nixon won the 5th district with an astonishing 87 percent of the vote; it was his strongest congressional district in the entire nation.

Lott and his future Senate colleague, Thad Cochran (also elected to Congress that year), were only the second and third Republicans elected to Congress from Mississippi since Reconstruction (Prentiss Walker was the first in 1964). Lott's strong showing in the polls landed him on the powerful House Judiciary Committee as a freshman, where he voted against all three articles of impeachment drawn up against Nixon during the committee's debate. After Nixon released the infamous "smoking gun" transcripts (which proved Nixon's involvement in the Watergate cover-up), however, Lott announced that he would vote to impeach Nixon when the articles came up for debate before the full House (as did the other Republicans who voted against impeachment in committee).

Lott became very popular in his district, even though almost none of its living residents had been represented by a Republican before. As evidence, in November 1974, Lott won a second term in a blowout. Cochran was also reelected in a rout; he and Lott were the first Republicans to win a second term in Congress from the state since Reconstruction. They were among the few bright spots in a year that saw many Republicans turned out of office due to anger over Watergate. Lott was re-elected six more times without much difficulty, and even ran unopposed in 1978. However, conservative Democrats continued to hold most of the region's seats in the state legislature, as well as most local offices, well into the 2000s.

In 1980, he served as Ronald Reagan's Mississippi state chairman. He served as House Minority Whip (the second-ranking Republican in the House) from 1981 to 1989; he was the first Southern Republican to hold such a high leadership position.

== U.S. Senate ==
=== Elections ===
Lott ran for the U.S. Senate in 1988, after 42-year incumbent John Stennis announced he would not run for another term. He defeated Democratic 4th District Congressman Wayne Dowdy by almost eight points. Lott won by running up a 70 percent margin in his congressional district, and was also helped by George H. W. Bush easily carrying the state in the presidential election. He never faced another contest nearly that close. He was re-elected in 1994, 2000, and 2006 with no substantive Democratic opposition. He gave some thought to retirement for much of 2005, however, after Hurricane Katrina, he announced on January 17, 2006, that he would run for a fourth term.

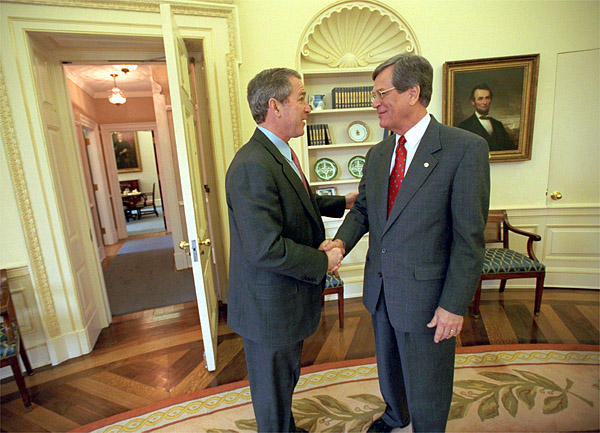
Lott with President George W. Bush in 2001

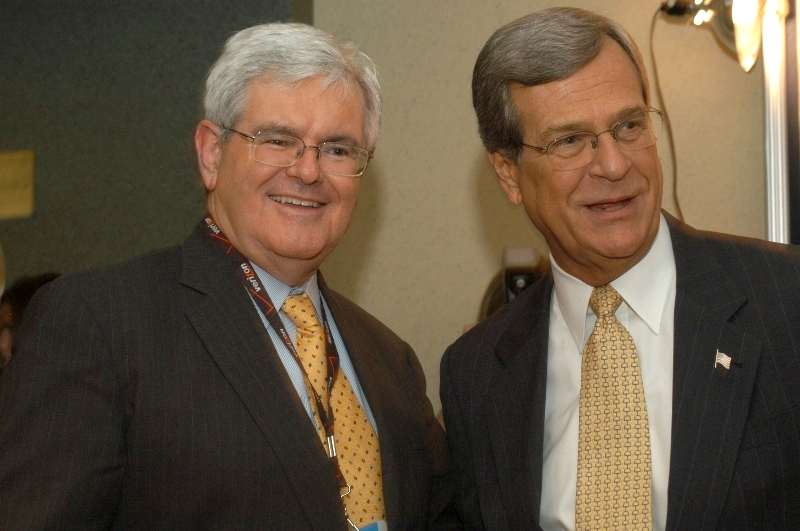
Sen. Trent Lott with former Speaker of the House Newt Gingrich (R-GA) at the 2004 Republican National Convention; both Lott and Gingrich provided consistent support to President George W. Bush

=== Tenure ===
In 1989, on the 25th anniversary of the murder of the civil rights activists James Chaney, Andrew Goodman, and Michael Schwerner, Lott and the rest of the Mississippi congressional delegation refused to vote for the non-binding resolution honoring the three men which nevertheless passed the Congress.

Along with John Ashcroft, Larry Craig, and Jim Jeffords, Lott was a part of a group of Senators who sang as a barbershop quartet. Lott sang bass. The senators sang "Elvira" at the 1996 Republican National Convention.

He became Senate Majority Whip when the Republicans took control of the Senate in 1995. In June 1996, he ran for the post of Senate Majority Leader to succeed Republican Bob Dole, who had resigned from the Senate to concentrate on his presidential campaign. Lott faced his Mississippi colleague Thad Cochran, the then-Chairman of the Senate Republican Conference. Cochran cast himself as an "institutionalist" and who would help to rebuild public trust in Congress through compromise over conflict. Lott promised a "more aggressive" style of leadership and courted the younger Senate conservatives. Lott won by 44 votes to 8. As majority leader, Lott had a major role in the Senate trial following the impeachment of President Bill Clinton. After the House narrowly voted to impeach Clinton, Lott proceeded with the Senate trial in early 1999, despite criticisms that Republicans were far short of the two-thirds majority required under the Constitution to convict Clinton and remove him from office.

Lott generally pursued a conservative position in politics and was a noted social conservative. For instance, in 1998, Lott caused some controversy in Congress when as a guest on the Armstrong Williams television show, he equated homosexuality with alcoholism, kleptomania and sex addiction. When Williams, a conservative talk show host, asked Lott whether homosexuality is a sin, Lott simply replied, "Yes, it is."

According to the Anti-Defamation League, Lott was a frequent speaker at the white supremacist group Council of Conservative Citizens. Although he denied knowing of the group's intentions, it was later revealed members of his family had CCC membership.

After the 2000 elections produced a 50–50 partisan split in the Senate, Vice President Al Gore's tie-breaking vote gave the Democrats the majority from January 3 to 20, 2001, when George W. Bush took office and Vice President Dick Cheney's tie-breaking vote gave the Republicans the majority once again. Later in 2001, he became Senate Minority Leader again after Vermont senator Jim Jeffords became an independent and caucused with the Democrats, allowing them to regain the majority. He was due to become majority leader again in early 2003 after Republican gains in the November 2002 elections.

In 2003, Lott coined the term "nuclear option".

==== Resignation from Senate leadership ====
Lott spoke on December 5, 2002, at the 100th birthday party of Senator Strom Thurmond of South Carolina, a retiring Republican senator who had switched parties from the Democrats decades earlier. Thurmond had run for President of the United States in 1948 on the Dixiecrat (or States' Rights Democratic) ticket. Lott said: "When Strom Thurmond ran for president, we voted for him. We're proud of it. And if the rest of the country had followed our lead, we wouldn't have had all these problems over all these years, either."

As a senator and presidential candidate, Thurmond maintained an explicit States' Rights platform that challenged the Civil Rights Movement and later, the Civil Rights Act as illegally overturning the separation of powers under the United States Constitution and called for the preservation of racial segregation. The Washington Post reported that Lott had made similar comments about Thurmond's candidacy in a 1980 rally. Lott gave an interview to BET explaining himself and repudiating Thurmond's former views.

In the wake of the controversy, Lott resigned as Senate Republican Leader on December 20, 2002, effective at the start of the next session, January 3, 2003. Bill Frist of Tennessee was later elected to the leadership position. In the book Free Culture, Lawrence Lessig argues that Lott's resignation would not have occurred had it not been for the effect of internet blogs. He says that though the story "disappear[ed] from the mainstream press within forty-eight hours", "bloggers kept researching the story" until, "finally, the story broke back into the mainstream press." The New York Times, however, attributed his resignation to "ruthless maneuvering" by Karl Rove and George W. Bush to depose Lott, "a threat to the president’s agenda", and replace him with Frist, who had "long been the president's choice."

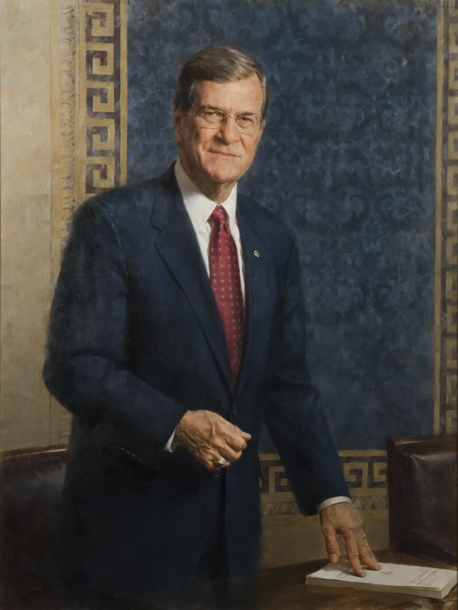
Lott's official Senate portrait

After losing the Majority Leader post, Lott was less visible on the national scene, although he did break with some standard conservative positions. He battled with Bush over military base closures in his home state. He showed support for passenger rail initiatives, notably his 2006 bipartisan introduction, with Sen. Frank Lautenberg of New Jersey, of legislation to provide 80 percent federal matching grants to intercity rail and guarantee adequate funding for Amtrak. On July 18, 2006, Lott voted with 19 Republican senators for the Stem Cell Research Enhancement Act to lift restrictions on federal funding for the research. On November 15, 2006, Lott regained a leadership position in the Senate, when he was named Minority Whip after defeating Lamar Alexander of Tennessee 25–24.

Senator John E. Sununu (R) of New Hampshire said, after Lott's election as Senate Minority Whip, "He understands the rules. He's a strong negotiator." Former House Speaker Newt Gingrich (R) said he's "the smartest legislative politician I've ever met."

==== 2006 re-election campaign ====
Lott faced no Republican opposition in his primary race. State representative Erik R. Fleming placed first of four candidates in the June Democratic primary, but did not receive the 50 percent of the vote required to earn the party's nomination. Fleming and the second-place finisher, business consultant Bill Bowlin, faced off in a runoff on June 27, which Fleming won with 65% of the vote. Fleming criticized Lott for not doing enough to alleviate poverty in "the poorest state in the nation." Fleming's bid was viewed as a longshot, and Lott handily defeated him with 64% of the vote in November. Meanwhile, Sen. Rick Santorum of Pennsylvania lost his seat, opening up the job of assistant Republican leader, and Lott defeated Lamar Alexander of Tennessee 25-24 for the job.

==== Resignation ====
On November 26, 2007, Lott announced that he would resign his Senate seat by the end of 2007. According to CNN, his resignation was at least partly due to the Honest Leadership and Open Government Act, which forbade lawmakers from lobbying for two years after leaving office. Those who left by the end of 2007 were covered by the previous law, which he cosponsored and which required a wait of only one year. In an interview regarding his resignation, Lott said that the new law "didn't have a big role" in his decision to resign.

Lott's resignation became effective at 11:30 p.m. on December 18, 2007. On January 7, 2008, it was announced that Lott and former Senator John Breaux of Louisiana, a Democrat, opened their lobbying firm about a block from the White House.

== Post-Senate career ==
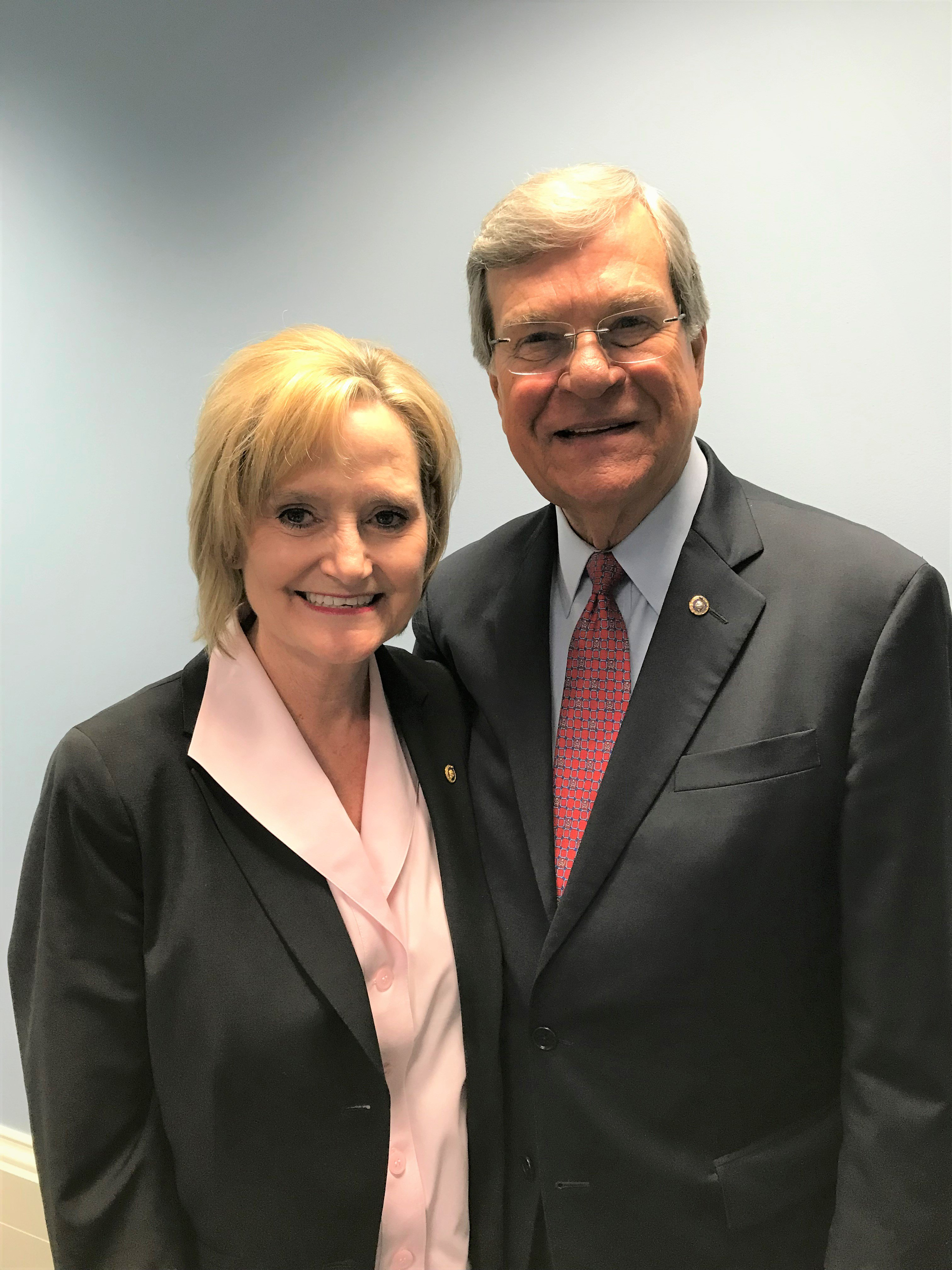
Lott with Cindy Hyde-Smith in 2018

In January 2008, he co-founded the Breaux-Lott Leadership Group, a "strategic advice, consulting, and lobbying" firm together with former Louisiana Senator John Breaux. The firm was later acquired by law and lobbying firm Patton Boggs, now Squire Patton Boggs following the June 2014 merger with Squire Sanders. In September 2014, lobbyist filings revealed that Lott was contracted to advocate on behalf of Gazprombank, a Russian majority state-owned bank targeted with sanctions over the 2014 pro-Russian unrest in Ukraine. Lott was fired by Squire Patton Boggs in June 2020; no explanation was initially provided for his departure. The firm later said Lott was removed because of the anti-racism 2020 protests, though Lott was already in negotiations to leave the firm. Lott joined lobbying firm Crossroad Strategies; John Breaux joined shortly after leaving Squire Patton Boggs. Lott also served on the EADS North America (now known as Airbus) board of directors.

On February 14, 2009, The New York Times reported the indictment of Judge Bobby DeLaughter for taking bribes from Richard Scruggs, Lott's brother-in-law. Scruggs represented Lott in litigation against State Farm Insurance company after the insurer refused to pay claims for the loss of his Mississippi home in Hurricane Katrina. According to The New York Times, federal prosecutors have said that Lott was induced by Scruggs to offer DeLaughter a federal judgeship in order to gain the judge's favor. In 2012, Lott testified in federal court that he never told DeLaughter that he would be recommended for a federal judgeship.

For the 2016 presidential election, Lott served as a national co-chair for John Kasich, before shifting his support to Donald Trump's campaign once he became the nominee.

In 2018 Sacha Baron Cohen's television program Who Is America? premiered showing Lott supporting the "kinderguardians program" which supported training toddlers with firearms. Lott appeared not to know it was a hoax.

Lott has been named an Honorary Patron of the University Philosophical Society, Trinity College, Dublin. Lott is on the Board of Selectors of Jefferson Awards for Public Service.

=== Memoir ===
Lott's memoir, entitled Herding Cats: A Life in Politics, was published in 2005. In the book, Lott spoke about the remark he made at the Strom Thurmond birthday party, former Senate Majority Leader Bill Frist, and his feelings of betrayal toward the Tennessee senator, claiming "If Frist had not announced exactly when he did, as the fire was about to burn out, I would still be majority leader of the Senate today." He also described former Democratic Leader Tom Daschle of South Dakota as "trustworthy". He also revealed that President George W. Bush, then–Secretary of State Colin Powell, and other GOP leaders played a major role in ending his career as Senate Republican Leader.

== Personal life ==
Lott married Patricia Thompson on December 27, 1964. The couple has two children: Chester Trent "Chet" Lott Jr., and Tyler Lott.

Lott is a Freemason, and holds the Grand Cross in the Southern Jurisdiction of the United States in the Ancient and Accepted Scottish Rite.

In April 2007, Lott reached a confidential settlement with the State Farm insurance company after suing State Farm for fraud. Lott lost his Mississippi home due to Hurricane Katrina, and State Farm declined to pay an insurance claim after ruling the home had water damage.

== Legacy ==
Trent Lott Academy in the Pascagoula School District is named after him. Lott is also the namesake of Trent Lott International Airport in Moss Point, Mississippi. The character of Lott Dod, a Neimoidian senator of the Trade Federation from the film Star Wars: Episode I – The Phantom Menace, is named after him.

The Trent Lott Leadership Institute is named after him, located at his alma mater, the University of Mississippi.

== Explanatory notes ==
U.S. House of Representatives
Preceded by William M. Colmer	Member of the U.S. House of Representatives from Mississippi's 5th congressional district 1973–1989	Succeeded by Larkin I. Smith
Preceded by Robert H. Michel	House Minority Whip; 1981–1989	Succeeded by Dick Cheney
Party political offices
Preceded by Bill Frenzel	Chair of the House Republican Research Committee; 1979–1981	Succeeded by Ed Madigan
Preceded by Robert H. Michel	House Republican Whip; 1981–1989	Succeeded by Dick Cheney
Preceded by Haley Barbour	Republican nominee for U.S. Senator from Mississippi (Class 1); 1988, 1994, 2000, 2006	Succeeded by Roger Wicker
Preceded by Bob Kasten	Secretary of the Senate Republican Conference; 1993–1995	Succeeded by Connie Mack III
Preceded by Alan K. Simpson	Senate Republican Whip; 1995–1996	Succeeded by Don Nickles
Preceded by Bob Dole	Senate Republican Leader; 1996–2003	Succeeded by Bill Frist
Preceded by J. C. Watts	Response to the State of the Union address 1998	Succeeded by Jennifer Dunn; Steve Largent
Preceded by Mitch McConnell	Senate Republican Whip; 2007	Succeeded by Jon Kyl
U.S. Senate
Preceded by John C. Stennis	U.S. Senator (Class 1) from Mississippi; 1989–2007; Served alongside: Thad Cochran	Succeeded by Roger Wicker
Preceded by Wendell Ford	Senate Majority Whip; 1995–1996	Succeeded by Don Nickles
Preceded by Bob Dole	Senate Majority Leader; 1996–2001	Succeeded by Tom Daschle
Preceded by Tom Daschle	Senate Minority Leader; 2001–2003	Succeeded by Tom Daschle
Preceded by Chris Dodd	Chair of the Senate Rules Committee; 2003–2007	Succeeded by Dianne Feinstein
Preceded by Chris Dodd	Chair of the Joint Inaugural Ceremonies Committee; 2004–2005	Succeeded by Dianne Feinstein
Preceded by Dick Durbin	Senate Minority Whip; 2007	Succeeded by Jon Kyl
U.S. order of precedence (ceremonial)
Preceded by George J. Mitchell as Former U.S. Senate Majority Leader	Order of precedence of the United States as Former U.S. Senate Majority Leader	Succeeded by Tom Daschle as Former U.S. Senate Majority Leader
