= 1967 in television =

The year 1967 in television involved some significant events. Below is a list of television-related events in 1967.

== Events ==
- January 7 – Debut of The Forsyte Saga in the UK, a blockbuster BBC dramatisation (the last to be made in black and white) in 26 50-minute episodes originally shown on BBC2. Because of the restricted number of viewers who can receive this channel, it is not until it begins BBC1 Sunday evening repeats on September 8 that it reaches a large audience which will build to 18 million and cause some church services to be rescheduled; it is also popular internationally and becomes the first British television programme ever to be sold to the Soviet Union.
- January 15
  - The inaugural Super Bowl American football game is simulcast on CBS and NBC.
  - The Rolling Stones appear on CBS's The Ed Sullivan Show, where, at Sullivan's insistence, they perform "Let's Spend the Night Together" as "Let's Spend Some Time Together."
- January 29 – The first CBS Playhouse presentation, The Final War of Olly Winter, is televised in the US.
- February 16 – The first airing of "Space Seed", the Star Trek television episode that introduces popular villain Khan Noonien Singh, as played by Ricardo Montalbán, is aired on NBC.
- February 23 – The Beatles make a taped appearance on ABC's American Bandstand, where they premiere their new music videos for the songs "Penny Lane" and "Strawberry Fields Forever".
- February 25 – Gene Kelly stars in Jack and the Beanstalk; airing on NBC and produced by Hanna-Barbera, it is the first TV special to combine live action and animation.
- March – Gunsmoke is renewed by CBS for the fall 1967 season. Aging (it is completing its 12th season) and declining in the ratings, CBS planned to cancel the western, but protests from viewers, network affiliates and even members of the United States Congress and especially William S. Paley (Gunsmoke is Paley's wife's favorite show), the head of the network, lead the network to move the series from its longtime late Saturday time slot to early Mondays for the fall — displacing Gilligan's Island, which initially had been renewed for the fall but is cancelled instead. Gunsmoke would remain on CBS until 1975.
- March 6 – Mark Twain Tonight! starring Hal Holbrook as Mark Twain, premieres on CBS.
- March 11 – This is the last day that French-language TV stations in Canada are required to run "personals" (classified advertising) between 6–7 p.m. Monday through Saturday.
- March 29 – 13-day strike by American Federation of Television and Radio Artists television staff announcers and newsroom staff begins.
- April 4 – BBC1 in the UK shows a Tom and Jerry cartoon for the first time.
- April 8 – The United Kingdom wins the 12th Eurovision Song Contest in Vienna, Austria. The winning song is "Puppet on a String" performed (barefoot) by Sandie Shaw.
- April 10 – The AFTRA strike is settled just in time for the 39th Academy Awards ceremony to be held.
- May 1 – The United Network (initially known as the Overmyer Network) launches broadcasting with the talk/variety show The Las Vegas Show — which will be the only show it airs, as both network and show disappear in June due in part to transmission expenses.
- May 13 – TV Bandeirantes São Paulo, the first network television station of Rede Bandeirantes, an officially regular broadcasting service, starts in Brazil.
- May 15 – CBS News and BBC host the "Town Meeting of the World" with governor Ronald Reagan and senator Robert F. Kennedy.
- May – David Dortort appoints himself executive producer of Bonanza, a move which takes him out of the day-to-day running of the show but allows him to focus on another NBC western, The High Chaparral.
- June 12
  - The fourth Peanuts special, You're in Love, Charlie Brown, with a springtime theme, has its premiere on CBS.
  - Major changes to ITV franchises in the UK which will take effect next year are announced.
- June 15 – ATV0, Melbourne, launches color television in Australia with live coverage of the Pakenham races.
- June 25 – The special Our World becomes the first live worldwide "via satellite" TV broadcast, transmitting to 30 countries. Performers include Mick Jagger, Marianne Faithfull, Keith Richards, Keith Moon, Eric Clapton, Pattie Harrison, Jane Asher, Graham Nash, Hunter Davies and The Beatles (who perform "All You Need Is Love", a song composed especially for the occasion).
- July 1 – With live coverage from the Wimbledon Championships of tennis, BBC2 becomes Europe's first color TV broadcaster, although it is still in the experimental stage.
- July 28 – First of three episodes broadcast in the Netherlands of VPRO's deliberately-provocative youth-oriented television show Hoepla, in which female artist Phil Bloom flashes nude in front of the cameras, resulting in complaints in the press.
- August 6 – Formula One auto racing has its first colour TV broadcast as the 1967 German Grand Prix, racing at Nürburgring, is colorcast to a West German audience on an experimental basis.
- August 21 – ABC's Dark Shadows and CBS's As the World Turns are the first daytime soaps on their respective US networks to go color.
- August 25 – Color television is officially launched in West Germany (simultaneously by ARD and ZDF) at precisely 9:30 am with a symbolic launch button pressed by Willy Brandt at the Internationale Funkausstellung Berlin.
- August 29 – US crime drama The Fugitive finale proves to be one of the most-watched episodes of the decade.
- September 2 – At 12:30 pm, Channel 9 in Sioux City, Iowa switches from being KVTV (CBS basic) to KCAU-TV (ABC full-time). Three days later, CBS returns to the area when KMEG-TV signs-on.
- September 9 – NBC airs what will prove to be the pilot of Rowan and Martin's Laugh-In, which has its actual series premiere on January 22, 1968.
- September 17
  - The Who destroy their instruments during a performance on CBS's The Smothers Brothers Comedy Hour.
  - The Doors appear on The Ed Sullivan Show and perform "Light My Fire". Sullivan requested that the line "Girl we couldn't get much higher" be changed for the show, but Jim Morrison performs it the way it was written, and the band is banned from the show as a result.
- September 18 – Love Is a Many Splendored Thing debuts on US daytime television and is the first soap opera to deal with an interracial relationship, involving an Amerasian woman. CBS censors find this too controversial and ask for script changes, causing show creator Irna Phillips to quit and 20th Century-Fox to withdraw as co-producers.
- September 29
  - Cult drama series The Prisoner, created by and starring Patrick McGoohan, has its UK premiere on ATV and Grampian Television. The world premiere was on September 5 when it debuted on CTV in Canada.
  - Captain Scarlet and the Mysterons, the popular science fiction Supermarionation series created by Gerry and Sylvia Anderson debuts on ITV in the UK.
- October 1
  - First colour television broadcasts are introduced in France, the RSFSR and BSSR using the SECAM system.
  - In the second episode of VPRO show Hoepla, broadcast in the Netherlands, Phil Bloom is revealed in a sketch to be completely naked, with a deliberate allusion to the controversy aroused by her appearance in the previous episode.
- November 7
  - United States President Lyndon B. Johnson signs the Public Broadcasting Act of 1967, establishing the Corporation for Public Broadcasting.
  - The Golden Jubilee October Revolution Day Parades in Moscow, Leningrad and Minsk are the first major events to be broadcast in color in the Soviet Union using the SECAM system.
- November 19 – TVB launches free-to-air television in Hong Kong.
- November 26 – A taped appearance by The Beatles is presented on the Ed Sullivan Show, premiering their new music video for the song "Hello Goodbye".
- November 27 – Thai Army Television converts from System M (a 525-line screen) to System B (625 lines) in preparation for PAL color (to be launched in 1969).
- December 2 – Color television is officially launched on BBC2 in the UK.
- December 11 – NBC airs the all-star special Movin' With Nancy, featuring Nancy Sinatra and guests.
- December 21 – The only guests for a highly rated holiday episode of The Dean Martin Show are the family members of Martin and Frank Sinatra.
- December 26 – The Beatles' Magical Mystery Tour airs on BBC1 in the UK. The band and their manager are critical of the decision to run it on this channel which can transmit only in black and white at this time.

Also in 1967

- All CBS soap operas in the US transition from live to tape broadcasts.
- PAL and SECAM video standards are introduced.
- The Federal Communications Commission in the US orders that cigarette ads on television, radio and in print must include a warning about the health risks of smoking.
- Country music entertainer Porter Wagoner invites Dolly Parton to join his weekly syndicated The Porter Wagoner Show, replacing singer Norma Jean.
- Cissy King replaces Barbara Boylan as Bobby Burgess's dance partner on The Lawrence Welk Show.

== Programs/Programmes ==
- American Bandstand (1952–89)
- Another World (1964–99)
- Armchair Theatre (1956–68)
- As the World Turns (1956–2010)
- Batman (1966–68)
- Bewitched (1964–72)
- Blue Peter (UK) (1958–present)
- Bonanza (1959–73)
- Bozo the Clown (1949–present)
- Candid Camera (1948–present)
- Captain Kangaroo (1955–84)
- Come Dancing (UK) (1949–95)
- Coronation Street (UK) (1960–present)
- Crossroads (UK) (1964–88, 2001–03)
- Daniel Boone (1964–70)
- Dark Shadows (1966–71)
- Days of Our Lives (1965–present)
- Dixon of Dock Green (UK) (1955–76)
- Doctor Who (UK) (1963–89, 1996, 2005–present)
- Face the Nation (1954–present)
- Family Affair (1966–71)
- Four Corners (Australia) (1961–present)
- General Hospital (1963–present)
- Get Smart (1965–70)
- Gomer Pyle, U.S.M.C. (1964–70)
- Grandstand (UK) (1958–2007)
- Green Acres (1965–71)
- Gunsmoke (1955–75)
- Hallmark Hall of Fame (1951–present)
- Hockey Night in Canada (1952–present)
- Hogan's Heroes (1965–71)
- I Dream of Jeannie (1965–70)
- I Spy (1965–1968)
- It's Academic (1961–present)
- Jeopardy! (1964–75, 1984–present)
- Lost in Space (1965–68)
- Love of Life (1951–80)
- Match Game (1962–69, 1973–84, 1990–91, 1998–99)
- Meet the Press (1947–present)
- Mission: Impossible (1966–73)
- Mutual of Omaha's Wild Kingdom (1963–88, 2002–present)
- My Three Sons (1960–72)
- Opportunity Knocks (UK) (1956–78)
- Panorama (UK) (1953–present)
- Petticoat Junction (1963–70)
- Peyton Place (1964–69)
- Play School (1966–present)
- Run for Your Life (1965–1968)
- Search for Tomorrow (1951–86)
- Star Trek (1966–69)
- That Girl (1966–71)
- The Andy Griffith Show (1960–68)
- The Avengers (UK) (1961–69)
- The Bell Telephone Hour (1959–68)
- The Beverly Hillbillies (1962–71)
- The Dean Martin Show (1965–74)
- The Doctors (1963–82)
- The Ed Sullivan Show (1948–71)
- The Edge of Night (1956–84)
- The Fulton Sheen Program (1961–68)
- The Good Old Days (UK) (1953–83)
- The Guiding Light (1952–2009)
- The Hollywood Palace (1964–1970)
- The Late Late Show (Ireland) (1962–present)
- The Lawrence Welk Show (1955–82)
- The Lucy Show (1962–68)
- The Mavis Bramston Show (Australia) (1964–68)
- The Mike Douglas Show (1961–82)
- The Money Programme (UK) (1966–present)
- The Monkees (1966–68)
- The Mothers-in-Law (1967–69)
- The Newlywed Game (1966–74)
- The Saint (UK) (1962–69)
- The Secret Storm (1954–74)
- The Sky at Night (UK) (1957–present)
- The Today Show (1952–present)
- The Tonight Show Starring Johnny Carson (1962–92)
- The Wednesday Play (UK) (1964–70)
- This Is Your Life (UK) (1955–2003)
- Tom and Jerry (1965–72, 1975–77, 1980–82)
- Top of the Pops (UK) (1964–2006)
- Truth or Consequences (1950–88)
- Walt Disney's Wonderful World of Color (1961–69)
- What the Papers Say (UK) (1956–2008)
- World of Sport (1965–85)
- Z-Cars (UK) (1962–78)

== Debuts ==
- January 7
  - The Forsyte Saga, BBC drama in 26 50-minute episodes
  - A prime-time edition of The Newlywed Game (1967–1971) on ABC
- January 9 – Mr. Terrific on CBS (last aired on August 27, 1967)
- January 13 – Rango on ABC (last aired on September 1, 1967)
- February 5 – The Smothers Brothers Comedy Hour (1967–1969) on CBS
- February 13 – Mr. Dressup (1967–1996) on CBC
- July 3 – News at Ten (1967–1999, 2001–2004, 2008–present) on ITV in the UK
- September 5
  - The Prisoner on Canada's CTV Television Network
  - Good Morning World on CBS (1967–1968)
- September 6 – He & She (1967–1968) and Dundee and the Culhane (fall 1967 only) both on CBS
- September 7
  - The Flying Nun (1967–1970) on ABC
  - Cimarron Strip (1967–1968) on CBS
- September 8 – Hondo (ended December 29, 1967) on ABC
- September 9 – Spider-Man (1967–1970) and George of the Jungle (1967) on ABC
- September 10 – The Mothers-in-Law (1967–1969) and The High Chaparral (1967–1971) both on NBC
- September 11 – The Carol Burnett Show (1967–1978) on CBS
- September 14 – Ironside (1967–1975) on NBC
- September 16 – Mannix (1967–1975) on CBS
- September 18 – Love is a Many Splendored Thing (1967–1973) on CBS daytime
- September 29 – The Prisoner is broadcast in the UK on ATV and Grampian Television
- October 1 – Ultra Seven (1967–1968) on TBS in Japan
- December 26 – Do Not Adjust Your Set on ITV (1967–1969)

== Ending this year ==
Date	Show	Debut
March 14	Combat!	1962
March 17	The Green Hornet	1966
April 9	Ultraman (Japan)	1966
April 15	Flipper	1964
April 22	Please Don't Eat the Daisies	1965
May 5	Rango	1967
May 21	Kimba the White Lion (Japan)	1966
August 29	The Fugitive	1963
September 1	The Time Tunnel	1966
September 3	What's My Line?	1950
September 4	Gilligan's Island	1964
September 16	Space Ghost	1966
October 4	Batfink	1966

== Births ==
Date	Name	Notability
January 2	Tia Carrere	American actress (Relic Hunter)
January 2	James Marshall	Actor (Twin Peaks)
January 8	R. Kelly	Singer
January 9	David Costabile	Actor
January 9	Dave Matthews	Guitarist
January 10	Jeremy Cumpston	Actor
January 13	Suzanne Cryer	Actress (Two Guys and a Girl, Silicon Valley)
January 16	Lynda Baquero	American correspondent
January 19	Christine Tucci	Actress
January 19	Javier Cámara	Actor
January 20	Stacey Dash	Actress (Clueless)
January 24	Phil LaMarr	Actor (Mad TV, Futurama, The Weekenders, Static Shock, Justice League, Samurai Jack, Ozzy & Drix, Foster's Home for Imaginary Friends, The Life and Times of Juniper Lee)
January 26	Bryan Callen	Actor and comedian (Mad TV)
February 1	Gabrielle Fitzpatrick	Australian actress (The Man from Snowy River)
February 2	Jenny Lumet	Actress
February 5	Chris Parnell	Actor and comedian (Saturday Night Live, 30 Rock)
February 10	Laura Dern	Actress (The Last Man on Earth)
February 10	Vince Gilligan	American writer
February 12	Jane Skinner	American former daytime news anchor
February 13	Carolyn Lawrence	Voice actress (voice of Sandy on SpongeBob SquarePants and Cindy on Jimmy Neutron)
February 16	Keith Gretzky	Hockey player
February 18	Tracey Edmonds	Anchor
February 19	Benicio del Toro	Actor
February 20	David Herman	Actor and comedian (Mad TV, Futurama, King of the Hill)
February 20	Andrew Shue	Actor (Melrose Place)
February 22	Paul Lieberstein	Screenwriter, actor and producer (The Office)
February 22	Bentley Mitchum	Actor
February 23	Paul Anthony Stewart	Actor (Guiding Light)
February 23	Eric Kaplan	Writer
February 26	Currie Graham	Actor
February 28	Charles Chun	Actor
March 1	George Eads	Actor (CSI: Crime Scene Investigation, Savannah, MacGyver)
March 6	Connie Britton	Actress and singer (Spin City, Friday Night Lights, Nashville)
March 7	Jeff Eastin	Writer
March 9	Jeffrey Nachmanoff	Screenwriter
March 11	John Barrowman	Scottish-American actor (Arrow)
March 11	George Gray	American television personality
March 16	Lauren Graham	Actress (Gilmore Girls, Parenthood)
March 16	Richard James Simpson	Singer
March 17	Billy Corgan	Singer
March 23	Sandra Dee Robinson	Actress (Another World)
March 25	Ben Mankiewicz	American television personality
March 27	Talisa Soto	Actress
March 28	Tracey Needham	Actress (Life Goes On, JAG)
March 29	Michel Hazanavicius	Producer
March 29	Christopher Thornton	Actor
April 2	Renée Estevez	Actress
April 6	Kathleen Barr	Canadian voice actress (Kevin and Marie on Ed, Edd n Eddy)
April 9	Margaret Josephs	American television personality
April 17	Leslie Bega	Actress (Head of the Class, CSI: NY, The Sopranos)
April 17	Kimberly Elise	Actress
April 17	Liz Phair	Singer
April 17	Henry Ian Cusick	Peruvian-Scottish actor (Lost)
April 18	Maria Bello	Actress (ER)
April 20	Lara Jill Miller	Actress and voice actress (Gimme a Break!, voice of Lisa Loud on The Loud House)
April 22	Sheryl Lee	Actress
April 22	Sherri Shepherd	Actress and comedian (Everybody Loves Raymond, Less than Perfect)
April 23	Melina Kanakaredes	Actress (Guiding Light, Providence, CSI: NY)
April 25	Jane Clayson Johnson	American journalist
April 26	Glenn Jacobs	Pro wrestler
April 26	Marianne Jean-Baptiste	English actress (Without a Trace)
April 27	Jason Whitlock	Sports commentator
April 28	Kari Wuhrer	Actress and singer (Sliders)
April 28	Jonathan Gilbert	Actor
May 1	Tim McGraw	Actor
May 2	Mika Brzezinski	Talk show host
May 4	Ana Gasteyer	Actress (Suburgatory, Lady Dynamite, People of Earth)
May 5	Buddy Giovinazzo	Filmmaker
May 12	Brent Forrester	Writer
May 14	Tony Siragusa	American National Football League defensive tackle (died 2022)
May 18	Nancy Juvonen	Film producer
May 20	Stephanie Niznik	Actress (Everwood) (died 2019)
May 20	Gabriele Muccino	Director
May 21	Chris Benoit	Canadian pro wrestler (NJPW, ECW, WCW, WWE) (died 2007)
May 22	Brooke Smith	Actress
May 24	Dana Ashbrook	Actor (Twin Peaks)
May 24	Eric Close	Actor (Without a Trace, Nashville)
May 24	Heavy D	Rapper (died 2011)
May 26	Beth Mowins	American play-by-play announcer and sports journalist
May 27	Eddie McClintock	Actor
May 27	Lou Gish	Actress (died 2006)
May 28	Glen Rice	NBA basketball player
May 30	Ali Adler	Canadian American television producer
May 31	Phil Keoghan	Host
June 1	Rick Peters	American actor
June 1	Siggy Flicker	Israeli American television personality
June 3	Anderson Cooper	American journalist
June 3	Jason Jones	American actor
June 4	Michael Greyeyes	Actor
June 5	Ron Livingston	American actor
June 5	David Ushery	American television news anchor
June 6	Max Casella	Actor (Doogie Howser, M.D., The Sopranos, Boardwalk Empire)
June 6	Paul Giamatti	Actor
June 8	Dan Futterman	Actor (Judging Amy)
June 10	June Carryl	Actress
June 16	Daniel Zelman	Actor (Damages)
June 17	Eric Stefani	Writer
June 18	David Burke	Writer
June 19	Araceli González	Actress
June 19	Chris Larkin	Actor
June 20	Nicole Kidman	Actress
June 21	Jim Breuer	Actor and comedian (Saturday Night Live)
June 21	Carrie Preston	Actress
June 24	Sherry Stringfield	Actress (ER)
June 25	Veena Sud	American television writer
June 25	Desiree Gruber	American television producer
June 28	Gil Bellows	Actor (Ally McBeal, The Agency)
June 28	Allan Heinberg	American film screenwriter
June 28	Peter Linz	American puppeteer
June 29	Melora Hardin	Actress and singer (Monk, The Office)
July 1	Pamela Anderson	Model and actress (Baywatch)
July 2	Peter Baker	Journalist
July 2	Jonathan Capehart	Journalist
July 6	Glen Mazzara	Writer
July 11	John Henson	American comedian
July 12	Natalie Desselle-Reid	Actress (Eve) (died 2020)
July 16	Will Ferrell	Actor and comedian (Saturday Night Live)
July 16	Jonathan Adams	American actor (American Dreams, Bones, Last Man Standing)
July 16	Brian Baker	Actor
July 18	Vin Diesel	Actor
July 20	Reed Diamond	Actor (Homicide: Life on the Street, Dollhouse)
July 23	Philip Seymour Hoffman	Actor (died 2014)
July 25	Matt LeBlanc	Actor (Joey on Friends)
July 25	Wendy Raquel Robinson	Actress (The Steve Harvey Show, The Game)
July 26	Jason Statham	Actor
July 27	Sasha Mitchell	Actor (Dallas, Step by Step)
August 1	José Padilha	Producer
August 2	Aline Brosh McKenna	Producer
August 4	Chuck Hogan	Screenwriter
August 9	Deion Sanders	NFL football player, MLB baseball player and sports analyst
August 11	Joe Rogan	Actor and comedian (NewsRadio)
August 12	Brent Sexton	Actor
August 13	Quinn Cummings	Actress (Family)
August 13	Byron Mann	Actor
August 15	Peter Hermann	Actor
August 17	David Conrad	Actor
August 21	Michael Bendetti	Actor and producer (21 Jump Street)
August 21	Serj Tankian	Singer
August 22	Adewale Akinnuoye-Agbaje	Actor (Oz, Lost)
August 22	Ty Burrell	Actor (Modern Family)
August 31	Jonathan Cake	English actor (Chuck, Desperate Housewives)
September 6	Chad L. Coleman	Actor (The Wire, The Walking Dead, The Expanse)
September 7	Leslie Jones	Actress and comedian (Saturday Night Live)
September 11	Harry Connick Jr.	American actor
September 12	Louis C.K.	American stand-up comedian
September 13	Michael Johnson	Sprinter
September 14	Dan Cortese	Actor (Veronica's Closet, What I Like About You)
September 17	Malik Yoba	Actor (New York Undercover)
September 19	Chris Sheridan	Actor
September 20	Kristen Johnston	Actress (3rd Rock from the Sun)
September 20	Victoria Dillard	American actress (Spin City)
September 22	Matt Besser	Actor
September 23	LisaRaye McCoy	Actress (All of Us)
September 23	Jenna Stern	Actress
September 27	Debi Derryberry	Voice actress (voice of Jimmy on Jimmy Neutron)
September 30	Andrea Roth	Canadian actress
October 1	Ajai Sanders	Actress (A Different World)
October 2	Tom Kiesche	Actor
October 4	Liev Schreiber	Actor (Ray Donovan)
October 4	Jovita Moore	News anchor (died 2021)
October 6	Bruno Bichir	Actor
October 7	Toni Braxton	Singer
October 8	Teddy Riley	Singer, songwriter and record producer
October 9	Eddie Guerrero	WWE pro wrestler (died 2005)
October 10	Michael Giacchino	Composer
October 11	Artie Lange	Comedian and actor (Mad TV)
October 13	Kate Walsh	Actress (Grey's Anatomy, Private Practice, 13 Reasons Why)
October 14	Stephen A. Smith	Sports journalist
October 16	Davina McCall	English TV presenter
October 18	Eric Stuart	Voice actor (voice of Brock and James on Pokémon) and singer
October 18	Lucky Yates	Voice actor
October 20	Fred Coury	Drummer
October 21	Marci Klein	Producer
October 23	Walt Flanagan	Comic book manager
October 26	Ali Farahnakian	Actor
October 26	Keith Urban	Singer (American Idol, The Voice)
October 27	Scott Weiland	Singer (died 2015)
October 28	Julia Roberts	Actress
October 29	Joely Fisher	Actress (Ellen, 'Til Death)
October 31	Vanilla Ice	Rapper and actor
October 31	Adam Schlesinger	American songwriter (died 2020)
November 1	Kara Vallow	American television animation producer
November 1	Michael Seitzman	American television producer
November 5	Judy Reyes	Actress (Scrubs, Devious Maids)
November 6	Rebecca Schaeffer	Actress (My Sister Sam) (died 1989)
November 8	Courtney Thorne-Smith	Actress (Melrose Place, Ally McBeal, According to Jim)
November 13	Jimmy Kimmel	Talk show host (Jimmy Kimmel Live!)
November 13	Matt Weitzman	American producer
November 13	Steve Zahn	American actor
November 15	E-40	Rapper and actor
November 16	Lisa Bonet	Actress (The Cosby Show, A Different World)
November 17	Ronnie DeVoe	American actor
November 17	John Kennedy	American actor
November 19	Randi Kaye	American television news journalist
November 22	Mark Ruffalo	Actor
November 23	Salli Richardson	Actress
November 25	Curtis Baldwin	Actor (227)
November 25	Niurka Marcos	Actress
November 28	Anna Nicole Smith	Model and actress (The Anna Nicole Show) (died 2007)
November 28	Stephnie Weir	Actress and comedian (Mad TV)
December 1	Nestor Carbonell	Actor (Suddenly Susan, Kim Possible, Lost, Bates Motel)
December 6	Judd Apatow	Producer
December 6	Bryan Johnson	American podcaster
December 7	Tino Martinez	Player
December 8	Michelle Miller	National correspondent
December 10	Arnold Pinnock	Actor
December 11	Peter Kelamis	Canadian voice actor (Rolf on Ed, Edd n Eddy)
December 11	Mo'Nique	Comedian and actress (The Parkers)
December 13	Jamie Foxx	Actor (In Living Color, The Jamie Foxx Show) and singer
December 14	Noelle Beck	American actress (Loving)
December 14	Kirsten Powers	American author
December 15	Keith Askins	NBA basketball player
December 17	Sonia Satra	Actress (Guiding Light, One Life to Live)
December 19	Bill Weir	American journalist
December 24	John Carpenter	Game show contestant
December 28	Sean Casey	Filmmaker
December 29	Ashleigh Banfield	Canadian-American journalist
December 31	Rebecca Rigg	Actress

== Deaths ==
Date	Name	Age	Notability
January 21	Ann Sheridan	51	Actress (Another World)
February 21	Charles Beaumont	38	Screenplay writer (Twilight Zone)
May 30	Claude Rains	77	Actor
June 29	Jayne Mansfield	34	Actress

== Television debuts ==
- Rutanya Alda – The Borgia Stick
- Tom Baker – Trapped!
- Ed Begley Jr. – My Three Sons
- Candice Bergen – Coronet Blue
- Dennis Christopher – The Time Tunnel
- Timothy Dalton – Sat'day While Sunday
- William Devane – N.Y.P.D.
- Antonio Fargas – Ironside
- Harrison Ford – The Virginian
- Frederic Forrest – Dark Shadows
- Paul Freeman – Champion House
- Michael Gambon – Softly, Softly
- Julius Harris – N.Y.P.D.
- Goldie Hawn – Good Morning World
- Eric Idle – No – That's Me Over Here!
- Diane Keen – Love Story
- Yaphet Kotto – NBC Experiment in Television
- Ed Lauter – Dark Shadows
- Kay Lenz – The Monroes
- Steve Martin – Off to See the Wizard
- Toshiro Mifune – Taiyo no Aitsu
- Helen Mirren – The Extravaganza of Golgotha Smuts
- Christopher Mitchum – Dundee and the Culhane
- Lorenzo Music – The Smothers Brothers Comedy Hour
- Annette O'Toole – My Three Sons
- Stephen Rea – Angel Pavement
- Buddy Rogers – The Lucy Show
- John Ritter – The Dating Game
- Alex Rocco – Batman
- Jan-Michael Vincent – Dragnet
- Michael York – The Forsyte Saga
