= Theo Wesselo =

Dutch actor

- Born: November 10, 1963 (age 62); Roterdam, Netherlands
- Occupations: Actor, musician

Theo Wesselo (Rotterdam, 10 November 1963) is a Dutch actor and musician. He is known for his involvement with the VPRO children's series Rembo & Rembo and voicing Purno in Purno de Purno.

== Biography ==
Wesselo was born in 1963 in Rotterdam. His career began in the mid-1980s with Rembo & Rembo, where he started his career in scriptwriting. The series ended in the mid-90s after VPRO interfered with its content, causing him to end his contract with the broadcaster. After that, he consumed a large amount of alcoholic beverages and drugs. As of 2015, he was confirmed to have ADHD. As the voice of Purno in Purno de Purno, an animated series also from VPRO, he coined Purno's catchphrase "sapperedosio!" (akin to "juicylicious!").

In 1992, he had a minor role in The Johnsons. He is also a visual artist, creating his first exhibit in 2015. He has the word FUCK in uppercase written on his belly, and some of his poems even tackle swearing. As of 2011, his excesses in alcohol and drugs had come to an end.

In the 2020s, he became famous for his appearances at the De Parate mobile theatre. In 2025, he created his own talk show specifically for the event, ZEG HET MAAR!, presented by Houme Ten Goede (one of his alter-egos) and Gerard Olthaar.

== Musical career ==
He re-emerged into the public eye in 2008 as the vocalist of Hausmagger. He writes the lyrics and composes the music to his songs. As of 2022, he had another alter ego, Ouwe Kut. His songs also include adult language and themes.
