= Mark Lotterman =

Dutch singer-songwriter

Mark Lotterman (born 31 January 1984) is a Dutch singer-songwriter from Rotterdam known for his observational songwriting and cross-disciplinary projects. Active since 2001, his career spans both English and Dutch-language releases alongside literary and visual art collaborations.

== Career ==
=== Early years and breakthrough (2001–2011) ===
Lotterman entered the music scene as a musical accompanist for poet Simon Vinkenoog and later performed at the 2009 P.C. Hooft-prijs ceremony for poet Hans Verhagen. Following his first two albums, he gained wider recognition with Funny (2011). The album's single "I Miss You" reached the local iTunes Top 10 after being featured in a national column by journalist Roelof Hemmen.

=== Holland project and hiatus (2012–2022) ===
In 2014 his album A year without summer was released under Harlem Records. In 2017, Lotterman launched Holland, a multidisciplinary art project centered on his fifth album. Following this project, Lotterman took a six-year hiatus from music to work in youth social care.

=== Dutch-language trilogy (2023–present) ===
Lotterman returned to recording with a shift to Dutch-language songwriting, releasing a trilogy of albums: Stedentrip (2023), Het regent nooit de hele dag (2025), and Indien later, dan ook nu (2026). These projects featured collaborations with Lucky Fonz III and André Manuel, and the 2026 release was supported by a joint tour with Meindert Talma.
