= IGAC =

IGAC may stand for:

- International Global Atmospheric Chemistry
- Inspecção Geral das Actividades Culturais
- Investors Group Athletic Centre in Winnipeg, Manitoba, Canada
- Geographic Institute Agustín Codazzi Colombian cartographic organisation
