= List of 2021 box office number-one films in Belgium =

The following is a list of 2021 box office number-one films in Belgium by weekend.

== Number-one films ==
This is a list of films that have placed number one at the box office in Belgium during 2021.

#	Weekend end date	Film	Weekend gross	Top 10 openings	Ref.
There is no box office data on the weekends of January 3-10.
3	17 January 2021	Trolls World Tour	US$1,671		
There is no box office data on the weekend of January 24.
5	31 January 2021	Trolls World Tour	US$97		
6	7 February 2021	Trolls World Tour	US$1,614		
7	14 February 2021	Trolls World Tour	US$2,030		
There is no box office data on the weekend of January 24.
9	28 February 2021	Trolls World Tour	US$972		
10	7 March 2021	Raya and the Last Dragon	US$62		
11	14 March 2021	Trolls World Tour	US$1,013		
12	21 March 2021	Raya and the Last Dragon	US$562		
13	28 March 2021	Raya and the Last Dragon	US$267		
There is no box office data on the weekend of April 4.
15	11 April 2021	Raya and the Last Dragon	US$824		
16	18 April 2021	Raya and the Last Dragon	US$618		
17	25 April 2021	Raya and the Last Dragon	US$128		
18	2 May 2021	Raya and the Last Dragon	US$182		
There is no box office data on the weekend of May 9.
20	16 May 2021	Raya and the Last Dragon	US$186		
21	23 May 2021	Raya and the Last Dragon	US$48		
22	30 May 2021	Raya and the Last Dragon	US$132		
23	6 June 2021	Trolls World Tour	US$116		
24	13 June 2021	Cruella	US$126,759		
25	20 June 2021	Cruella	US$97,276		
26	27 June 2021	Cruella	US$168,644	Nobody (#2), The Courier (#3), Promising Young Woman (#4)	
27	4 July 2021	Cruella	US$151,259		
28	11 July 2021	Black Widow	US$675,383	The Croods: A New Age (#2)	
29	18 July 2021	F9: The Fast Saga	US$1,700,000		
30	25 July 2021	F9: The Fast Saga	US$622,000	Old (#3), The Marsman (#7)	
31	1 August 2021	F9: The Fast Saga	US$438,000	Jungle Cruise (#2)	
32	8 August 2021	Jungle Cruise	US$302,188	The Forever Purge (#2), Chaos Walking (#3), The Green Knight) (#5)	
33	15 August 2021	Free Guy	US$236,001	PAW Patrol: The Movie (#2)	
34	22 August 2021	Free Guy	US$237,426		
35	29 August 2021	Free Guy	US$246,254		
36	5 September 2021	Shang-Chi and the Legend of the Ten Rings	US$503,370		
37	12 September 2021	Shang-Chi and the Legend of the Ten Rings	US$404,955		
38	19 September 2021	Shang-Chi and the Legend of the Ten Rings	US$206,787		
39	26 September 2021	Shang-Chi and the Legend of the Ten Rings	US$158,883		
40	3 October 2021	Shang-Chi and the Legend of the Ten Rings	US$145,703		
41	10 October 2021	Shang-Chi and the Legend of the Ten Rings	US$96,023		
42	17 October 2021	The Last Duel	US$89,325		
43	24 October 2021	Ron's Gone Wrong	US$100,700		
44	31 October 2021	Antlers	US$97,188	The French Dispatch (#3)	
45	7 November 2021	Eternals	US$746,984		
46	14 November 2021	Eternals	US$458,411		
47	21 November 2021	Eternals	US$171,632		
48	28 November 2021	Encanto	US$337,935		
49	5 December 2021	House of Gucci	US$303,000	Parallel Mothers (#3)	
50	12 December 2021	Encanto	US$337,935	West Side Story (#2)	
51	19 December 2021	Encanto	US$138,364	Spencer (#4)	
52	26 December 2021	Encanto	US$230,741		

== Highest-grossing Films ==
=== In-Year Release ===
Highest-grossing films of 2022 by In-year release
Rank	Title	Distributor	Gross
1	Spider-Man: No Way Home	Sony	US$12,444,982
2	No Time to Die	Universal	US$8,596,206
3	F9: The Fast Saga	Universal	US$4,527,093
4	Sing 2	Sony	US$3,926,922
5	Dune: Part One	N/A	US$3,300,000
6	Encanto	Disney	US$2,679,692
7	House of Gucci	Sony	US$2,150,168
8	Black Widow	Disney	US$1,897,848
9	Shang-Chi and the Legend of the Ten Rings	Disney	US$1,866,538
10	Eternals	Disney	US$1,841,546

Highest-grossing films by Kijkwijzer rating of 2021
AL/TOUS	Paw Patrol: The Movie
6	Sing 2
9	N/A
12	Spider-Man: No Way Home
14	N/A
16	The King's Man
18	N/A
