= Purno de Purno =

- Also known as: Purno
- Genre: Animation; Surreal comedy
- Created by: Marcus Vlaar; Hans Wessels
- Country of origin: Netherlands
- Original language: Dutch
- No. of seasons: 5
- No. of episodes: 56

Production
- Animators: Marcus Vlaar; Hans Wessels
- Running time: 13 minutes (season 2); 2 1/2 minutes (season 3); 7 minutes (seasons 4 and 5)
- Production companies: Hootchie Cootchie Cartoons; VPRO

Original release
- Network: VPRO (Nederland 2)
- Release: 5 January 1992 – February 9, 1992
- Network: Nederland 3 via Z@ppelin
- Release: November 6, 1994 – 12 November 2007

Purno de Purno, also simply known as Purno, is a Dutch television series created by Marcus Vlaar and Hans Wessels. The series aired on the children's slot on Nederland 2, airing under the VPRO's children's block in its first run. It also became notorious for its adult jokes, becoming the first children's series to be blocked by YouTube for underage users.

== Premise ==
The series focuses on the bizarre adventures of Purno, a man in a purple suit, speaking with a nasal voice (played by Theo Wesselo, of Rembo & Rembo). His catchphrase is "sapperedosio!" (a neologism representing surprise, concern, approval or disapproval). The catchphrase was reportedly adapted from a song featuring the term "sapperedosia" by Johnny Jordaan; whose last letter was replaced by a Rotterdam-style "-o". Other characters include Buuf, Purno's beautiful neighbor, Stupid Duck (Stomme Eend), the Chinese villain Dr. Ha Chiu, Pedo, a postman who licks stamps, Kiet, a giant blue elephant-like monster that tickles drawn in a stereotypical view of black people with a Surinamese accent that tickles and Sjakie, an abstract-looking big-nosed yellow creature who lives inside a painting. The character later became a Chinese stereotype at the later seasons in order to make the series seem more diverse.

Beginning in season 2, the action takes place in Hootchie Cootchie Stad (Hootchie Cootchie City).

== List of episodes ==
=== Season 1 (1992) ===
Six episodes of ten minutes each. Airdates in this section refer to the 1992 run. Season 1 is the only one in the series to follow a serialized structure, involving Purno's quest to restore Princess Sanseveria's beauty.

- Purno is de lul (5 January 1992)

Princess Sanseveria is being held hostage by Kietelaar and his aide Cas Vegas. In desperation, his father King Purschuim holds a tournament to find the kingdom's most courageous warrior. Purno, an unsuspecting spectator, bumps into the competition by mere chance and wins his opponents. An impossible task awaits him: freeing the princess from Kietelaar's clutches.

- In het hol van de kietelaar (Note: Also known as Oog en oog met de kietelaar) (12 January 1992)

After an exhaustive trip across the Klikklak Desert, Purno enters a maze trap. There, he is threatened to death by Kietelaar. Using a stratagem, he tries to escape, but the villains stole Sanseveria's beauty. Purno frees her the two get married, but heads to the Purnomobile (gifted by Purschuim) in order to rescue her beauty.

- De schaduwwereld van Cas Vegas (19 January 1992)

Purno is captured by Cas Vegas and is imprisoned in the Shadow Planet. Purno escapes using his shadow alone.

- De binnenstebuiten planeet (26 January 1992)

Purno travels to the Inside-Out Planet to hear Mr. Oei's advice to help restore the princess's beauty. However, his place was taken over by Pad Pong, who is trying to manipulate Purno. He sends Purno to the edge of the universe to find a herb, the only ingreident left in his wonder elixir.

- Meiniedeinies (2 February 1992)

During his trip to the edge of the universe, Purno encounters the Meiniedeinies, aliens determined to take the control of his personality. He escapes and finds Vulva, the mother of the cosmos. He picks up the herb with her help, which he plans to exchange with Pad Pong for the beauty of the princess.

- Het wonderelixer van Pad Pong (9 February 1992)

Upon arriving to Pad Pong's lair, Purno falls again under Kietelaar's clutches. He then witnesses Pad Pong upon drinking the magic elixir. Purno manages to escape and brought a flask of the elixir to Princess Sanseveria.

=== Season 2 (1994-1995) ===
Ten episodes of thirteen minutes each.

- Coconut Sjakie (6 November 1994)

Purno plays the new videogame Coconut Sjakie, where Sjakie is being attacked by coconut-throwing gorillas. When Purno tries to defend Sjakie, the gorillas throw Purno into the game. Together, Purno and Coconut Sjakie pass through levels with bees, bodybuilders and computer viruses.

- Het droomgat (13 November 1994)

Purno suffers nightmares. Dream therapist Mr. Oei puts him into therapy using his newest invention, the dream machine. Purno ends up in Oei's grandmother's dream by mistake; if she wakes up, Purno ceases to exist. In order to bring him back, Mr. Oei takes his place in the machine and dives into the subconscious world of dreams and desires.

- Superpurno en het snifsnaf poeder (20 November 1994)

Purno receives the wrong cold medication from Dr. Ha Chiu. After a large dose of that magic powder which Superman, an American superhero, uses as a stimulant, Purno gains superpowers and does heroic tasks. Saving people gets tiresome. Purno finds himself relieved when Superman recovers both the powder and his powers.

- Sunil Baba en de 40 graden was (27 November 1994)

Upon finding a missing sock in the washing machine, Purno gets trapped in another world where missing clothes are. These are kept under the control of Sunil Baba, an orange shirt which acts like a guru.

- Puzzelbach am Niesl (4 December 1994)

Purno is assembling a puzzle of a Swiss mountain. Each piece Purno puts becomes real, putting him in the location of the landscape. However, only one piece was missing, with a local girl, Gretel. Purno must find the missing piece for both the puzzle and the reality to complete each other again.

- Stage crazy (11 December 1994)

Purno gets involved in amateur theatre. It all begins with rehearsals, which unexpectedly attract a full audience. Buuf, his neighbor, plays the role of a princess who was kidnapped by Gabriel. Purno's mission is to save the princess. The actors are engaged with their roles to an extent where fiction and reality get mixed. Even the sets are more realistic than the actors imagine.

- Canard d'art (18 December 1994)

Purno visits an exhibit by his friend Stomme Eend (pseudonym of Canard Stupide). After drinking too much lemon soda, he ends up inside a painting, where he meets Sjakie Inspirasie, who claims to be responsible for all the paintings. To test Purno that he knows a lot of things, Sjakie tells him about the history of modern art, from Piet Mondrian to Joan Miró, where he discovers that art is full of surprises. At the end, Shakie convinces Purno to do a nude pose for him.

- Het kapperscomplot (25 December 1994)

Two unemployed hairdressers try to increase their customer base throwing hair growth products to the potable water supply of Hootchie Cootchie Stad. Due to several cases of mistaken identity, in which Purno, unaware, takes a fundamental role, it was Buuf's shaving product that fell into the water.

- Beauty on the Beach (1 January 1995)

A sunny day in Hootchie Cootchie Stad turns into a storm, causing Purno to travel to an island where he was held captive by a giant woman. Purno tries a series of attempts to escape from that oppressive love, but without success. When Purno finally ends up crying, the giantess understands that he should be set free.

- Speciale aanbieding (8 January 1995)

In an attempt to get the body of an Adonis through hormonal therapy, Purno commits a fatal mistake: the wrong hormone treatment give him a female body. To worsen the situation, he and Buuf are kidnapped and taken as slaves into an exotic desert outing.

=== Season 3 (1996) ===
Twenty-six episodes of 2.5 minutes each.

- Willem Ruis

When Purno settles in to watch an episode of his show Purno de Purno, Willem Ruis ruins his day.

- Mol in je Hol

Purno is taking a sunbath when moles come out of the rooftop where he is.

- Irritantjes

An annoying couple is the personification of all problems and suffering one can find in life. They put everyone involved to the test. Whoever gets past his torments will leave as a wise man.

- 100% Scheithanz

Gurlie's new sex partner is 100% Scheithanz. They say he is good on the inside, but they don't know why is he silent.

- Vlinderhypnose

Purno is hypnotized by a butterfly, who, in his imagination, later looks like him.

- Ruzie in de slagerij

Purno's experience at the butcher isn't pleasant, causing a brawl.

- Supersuck 2000

A revolutionary breakthrough in suction power, Supersuck 2000, is presented.

- Levensliedje

Purno gets a song about life stuck as an earworm.

- Kleine Purno

Purno experiences stinky pancakes with extra garlic.

- In de wolken

Purno goes swimming with a mole and suggests to take his clothes off; the mole doesn't wear any clothes.

- In de kast

Kietelaar wants to know why is Purno completely naked in Gurlie's closet.

- Het Kameraadje

Purno feels like he is being permanently watched all time.

- Gat in de muur

Purno has his head full of air through a hole in a wall, which is exploited as a natural phenomenon.

- Zwart beest

Purno encounters a strange black beast and does not know what to do with it.

- Purno goes interactive

Purno interacts with real people and tries what it feels like to be on drugs.

- Purno de Purno de Purno

Purno is out of control and thinks it's time to take some fresh air.

- Kerstverhaal

Purno crashes with a bird on Christmas Eve.

- De grote Bikini verdwijntruc

Purno wants to see a giant bikini disappear.

- Oud en Nieuw

The annoying couple repents not giving Purno a gift over the holiday season.

- Stand-up Comedian

Purno has fun with a stand-up comedian at a bar near the port.

- Onzichtbaarheidslotion

Purno goes invisible.

- Reïncarnatie

Purno looks back at his past lives to see why his current life has no problems.

- Hoil Therapie

Purno pays for crying therapy, but ends up in laugh therapy.

- Opperwezen

Beings from another planet kidnap migrant workers because their bathtub got clogged.

- Extra knoflook

Stomme Eend holds an "arty-farty-party" in his bedroom, but Purno ate too much pancakes with extra garlic.

- De PurnoPosse is in the house

Purno gets in a party.

=== Season 4 (2005-2006) ===
Thirteen episodes of 7 minutes each.

- Het geheime kistje

Kiet and Sjakie discover a wonderful surprise for Purno's birthday, keeping everything a secret. When Purno threatens to reveal it, they are forced to take drastic measures.

- De grote blote vrouw

One day, a big, naked woman walks downtown. As much as Kiet and Sjakie are interested in conquering her, Purno wins the grand prize, as he appreciates her esssence.

- Pizza Fantasia

Purno and Kiet compete for who has the most imagination. When Sjakie opens the doors to his own subconscious, chaos emerges, as they had both ordered a Pizza Fantasia.

- Blotensteijn

Purno, Kiet and Sjakie go on vacation to Blotensteijn, a nudist camp with only one rule: staying completely naked. Purno doesn't want to do so.

- El Boeffo

Hootchie Cootchie Stad is under attack by a serial criminal who puts everybody's pants down. They discover he looks like Purno.

- Homo Museum

At an anthropological museum, Sjakie takes Purno and Kiet on a journey through the evolution of mankind, from the homo erectus to the fictional Homo Zeldzamus. Purno could be descended from this last one.

- Tutti frutti

The Tutti Frutti monsters from the planet Toedeledoki go on vacation to Hootchie Cootchie Stad, where Sjakie tries to get rich quick with their visit.

- Økenøken

Purno, Kiet and Sjaak are playing a Scandinavian board game, Økenøken, but disagree with its rules. They ask its creator, cousin Nøf, for help.

- Sjakie's Dating Service

Sjakie and Kiet have girlfriends. This means they don't have a partner for Purno to play Økenøken. Purno tries to find a girlfriend.

- All inclusive

Purno wins the top prize in Sjakie's instant lottery: an all inclusive vacation with snacks, drinks and more, except peeing.

- Boogie & Woogie

When Purno discovers a small zipper in Kiet's belly, he finds out that a man lives behind it. It is actually one of the members of Boogie & Woogie, a legendary band, which used to present ad Club Zombie, in Mathenesserdijk.

- Pokon Purno

Purno buys a special seed from Sjakie, which sprouts a special flower that ends up looking like him, wreaking havoc.

- Sjakie de Sjakie

A rivalry emerges between Purno and Sjakie over tho is the coolest. The two initiate a competition; the winner gets the chance to take part in his very own TV show.

=== Season 5 (2007) ===
Seven episodes of 7 minutes each.

- Kreezie Kloontje

World renowened filmmaker Kreezie Kloontje is looking for talented animated characters to take part in Kreezie Kloontje 5, the latest installment of his titular film series.

- Gurlie

Sjakie tries to open a shop but ends up receiving critical customers.

- Zwarte Sjakie

Purno, Kiet and Sjaak discover two doors on the dyke during an afternoon nature walk. Behind the doors, they discover Zwarte Sjakie's paradise, where they are brothers having a party.

- Dr. Freundshaft

The three haven't been with each other, causing them to look for Dr. Freundshaft, "Certified Poop and Friendship Therapist", for help.

- De Vlinderkoning

Sjakie turns Purno's head upside down with a magnificent poem on the essence of life, Eenzaamheid. This caused Purno to reflect on his life, which up until then was purely superficial.

- Prins Carnaval

Prins Carnaval discovers the meaning of the word "sapperedosio", Purno's catchphrase, on a holiday in the south of the country.

- Het Mysterie van de verdwenen Harderwijker

Purno and Kiet are stars in Sjakie's latest play, Het Mysterie van de verdwenen Harderwijker, where fantasy and reality collide. Against all odds, it becomes a smash hit, but they have to deal with the conseuqences.

== Production ==
According to the creators Marcus Vlaar and Hans Wessels, the name Purno comes from their childhood's best friend:

"We used to live next to a tennis court. My younger brother had a friend, Vincent, who spoke with a bit of a nasal twang and was really good at finding balls. Whenever someone hit a ball over the fence, Vincent would say, ‘Just you wait, *Speurneus* [Sleuth] will find the ball!’ *Speurneus* became Purno; that’s what everyone called him. Marcus and I thought it was a funny name."

Vlaar and Wessels had previously studied fine art painting at the Willem de Kooning Academy but found the canvas too limiting; they subsequently enrolled in the Image and Media Technology program at the Utrecht School of the Arts, where they were introduced to computer animation with two megabytes of RAM and only 32 colors at a resolution of 320×200 pixels. The frame rate was just 12 frames per second (half the standard rate). Animations were saved to diskette on the Amiga, after which they could be recorded onto Betacam in the Hootchie-Cootchie Cartoons studio at Rotterdam and subsequently edited into a complete animated film.

The character Purno was created in 1988 as a mix of Marcus and Vlaar. The series was not only popular with children, but also with adults, as other VPRO programmes were referenced (Ffukkie Slim and Keepvogel) as well as paintings by Salvador Dalí and Edward Hopper. Purno's first appearance was in a science show on the same VPRO slot, Het torren van pizzas (The Tower of Pizzas) in 1989, after which it became a standalone series in 1992. Series 4 and 5 were also largely created digitally, though using technology from around 2006. The animation is hand-drawn and then scanned into Toon Boom Harmony alongside backgrounds at Photoshop mixed with CGI elements. For Series 5, the company Urrebuk—which had by then taken over production—switched to cut-out animation done at Anime Studio Pro, which allowed for a significant acceleration of the production process. At the time, Urrebuk consisted of founders Maarten Visser, Bas de Ruiter, Michiel Wesselius, and Sander Alt. They produced 20 episodes commissioned by Purno's creators who wrote the scripts and handled the production side of things from 2005 onwards.

At its peak, the demographic with the most fans were underaged nonetheless it received letters from parents because of the sexual jokes. The producers thought that Since August 2013, most YouTube copies of the series were age-restricted to underage viewers. The producers at the time thought that violence was a much worse influence than sex.

Wessels later went on to create, also for VPRO, Ffukkie Slim, which aired on Z@ppelin in 2002 to 2007 attracting a huge 8-12 audience.

== Broadcast ==
Initially, Purno de Purno aired in the Sunday morning VPRO children's block, later moving to weekdays before Sesamstraat. It was in this timeslot that criticism began.

The fourth season was repeated from 6 September 2007 on Zappelin on Nederland 3.

== Homages ==
From 7 March to 2 June 2002, a Purno Poseert event was held at Villa Zebra in Rotterdam, introducing children to artistic disciplines.

A Purno Day was held at Melkweg in Amsterdam on 16 June 2018, with a non-stop seven-hour loop of all of its episodes. Several of its staff are fans of the series.
