= Games Rating Authority =

British government agency for video game rating

- Logo adopted in 2023
- Formerly: The Video Registration Council; The Video Standards Council
- Industry: Video game rating
- Founded: 1989
- Headquarters: Stevenage, Hertfordshire, United Kingdom
- Area served: United Kingdom
- Key people: Tony Lake (Chair)
- Website: www.gamesratingauthority.org.uk

The Games Rating Authority (GRA), previously known as the Video Standards Council (VSC), is an administrator of the PEGI system of age rating for video games. It was established in 1989, as the VSC, originally with the purpose of helping retailers to adhere to the Video Recordings Act 1984 and educating retailers on its requirements. It has been statutorily responsible for the age ratings of video games sold in the United Kingdom since 2012. The organisation is accountable to the Department of Culture, Media and Sport. In conjunction with the International Age Rating Coalition (IARC), PEGI ratings are also voluntarily applied to games and apps on a range of digital stores.

== History ==
The VSC was created in 1989 following concerns from then Home Secretary Douglas Hurd regarding the enforcement of the Video Recordings Act 1984. The organisation designed a code of practise to ensure that the recorded video and video game industries delivered their products to the public responsibly, as well as providing retailers with staff training courses concerning the supply of age restricted videos, DVDs and video games.

In 1994, the VSC first began administrating the age ratings of video games sold within the UK. Initially, they worked on behalf of the UK Interactive Entertainment Association (formerly ELSPA) via a voluntary system of game ratings which most publishers adopted. In 2003, the ELSPA ratings were replaced by the Pan European Game Information PEGI system. The GRA continues today to administrate the PEGI system alongside NICAM (Netherlands Institute for the Classification of Audiovisual Media); NICAM classifying games for ages 3 to 7, and the GRA classifying games for ages 12 and above.

In 2012, the government removed the responsibility of the British Board of Film Classification (BBFC) to rate video games except those containing strong pornographic content, passing responsibility to the VSC. At the same time, the PEGI system was incorporated into UK law. Since this time, the organisation has been the statutory body responsible for the age rating of all video games within the UK. Between 2012 and 2017, the VSC operated using the brand name Games Rating Authority, with the brand VSC Rating Board used between 2017 and 2023. The GRA branding was subsequently readopted as an operating name in June 2023.

On 30 September 2024, the VSC formally changed its legal name to the Games Rating Authority, with the original "The Video Standards Council Limited" being retained as a separate entity in connection with its ongoing work with retail partners. The GRA also rates games for approximately 40 other European countries.
