= PEGI =

European video game content rating system

Pan-European Game Information
- Formation: 9 April 2003; 23 years ago
- Type: not-for-profit company with a social purpose
- Location: Brussels, Belgium
- Coordinates: 50.84357°N 4.36998°E
- Region served: Most European countries (Germany and Russia are notable exceptions)
- Parent organization: Video Games Europe
- Website: pegi.info

PEGI (/ˈpɛɡi/ PEG-ee), short for Pan-European Game Information, is a European video game content rating system established to help European consumers make informed decisions when buying video games or apps through the use of age recommendations and content descriptors. It was developed by the Interactive Software Federation of Europe (now Video Games Europe) and came into use in April 2003, replacing many national age rating systems with a single European system.

The administration, monitoring and further development of the PEGI system are the responsibility of PEGI s.a., a not-for-profit company incorporated under Belgian law which pursues a social purpose.

The PEGI system is now used in 36 countries and is based on a code of conduct, a set of rules to which every publisher using the PEGI system is contractually committed. PEGI self-regulation is composed by five age categories and nine content descriptors that advise the suitability of a game for a certain age range based on the game's content. The age rating is not intended to indicate the difficulty of the game or the skill required to play it.

== Age ratings ==
PEGI has six age categories.

Rating	Description
	PEGI 3 rating is used on games which content is considered suitable for all age groups. PEGI 3 games shouldn't contain bad language or content that is considered to be too frightening to young children. Any depicted violence should be very mild and depicted in a comical context or a childlike setting.
	Games with PEGI 7 rating may contain content that can be seen as frightening to younger children. Violence depicted in implied, non-detailed or non-realistic way is acceptable. As of July 2026, will also include games "play by appointment", such as daily or weekly quests.
	Games with PEGI 12 rating can include violence depicted in a slightly more graphic nature towards fantasy characters or non-realistic violence towards human-like characters. They may contain sexual innuendos, sexual posturing or mild bad language. As of July 2026, will also include games with time- or quantity-limited in-game purchasable content.
	PEGI 16 rating is applied on games with a realistic depiction of violence or sexual activity, more extreme use of bad language, usage of tobacco, alcohol or illegal drugs. As of July 2026, will also include games with purchasable random items like loot boxes.
	PEGI 18 classification is applied on games with violence depicted in a way that can be seen as gross or towards defenceless characters. Content may also contain apparently motiveless killing. The rating also applies when illegal drugs, simulation of gambling or explicit sexual activity is glamorised. As of July 2026, will also include games with entirely unrestricted communication features and block chain or NFT purchasing features.
	In addition to age ratings, there is a special rating represented by an exclamation point labeled "Parental Guidance Recommended". These contents are available for all ages, but it is recommended that parents (mostly with children who are under the age of 18) supervise activities within the program.

=== Content descriptions ===
In addition to the above ratings, PEGI also uses nine content descriptors:

==== Current ====
Icon	Content descriptor	Active since	Explanation	Corresponding age ratings
	Bad Language	2003	The game contains bad language. This descriptor can be found on games with a PEGI 12 (mild swearing), PEGI 16 or PEGI 18 rating (e.g. sexual expletives or blasphemy).	PEGI 12 PEGI 16 PEGI 18
	Discrimination	2003	The game contains depictions of ethnic, religious, nationalistic or other stereotypes deemed likely to encourage hatred. This content is always restricted to a PEGI 18 rating (and may infringe national criminal laws). As of 2026, only five titles have this descriptor: two expansions for Postal 2 – Share the Pain (2004) and Apocalypse Weekend (classified 2005); Original War (classified 2004); Patriots: A Nation Under Fire (2006); and SWAT: Target Liberty (2007, the only PSP title to do that).	PEGI 18
	Drugs	2003	The game refers to or depicts the use of illegal drugs, narcotics, alcohol or tobacco. Games with this content descriptor are rated either PEGI 16 or PEGI 18.	PEGI 16 PEGI 18
	Fear/Horror	2003	The Fear descriptor may appear on games with a PEGI 7 if they contain pictures or sounds that may be frightening or scary to young children. The Horror descriptor may appear on PEGI 12 or PEGI 16 games with horror sound effects or images, but not necessarily any violent content. Although PEGI's official website states that only games rated PEGI 7 may carry the Fear descriptor as of 2024, it also lists three titles previously rated PEGI 12 – Road to India (classified 2007), Ultima VII Complete (classified 2013) and the hidden object game collection Grim Tales: Die Gray Familien-Saga (2017) – as well as the PEGI 16 title ABE VR (2016) as displaying the Fear descriptor instead of Horror.	Fear: Horror:
	Gambling	2003	The game contains elements that reference or simulate gambling. References include games with prominent themes to gambling. Simulations of gambling refer to games of chance that are normally carried out in casinos or gambling halls. As of 2026, games that contain gambling themes are rated PEGI 12, while games that simulate gambling are rated PEGI 18. Previously, games that simulated gambling could be classified at PEGI 12 or PEGI 16, although these older games retain their existing classifications.	Former:
	Sex	2003	This content descriptor can accompany a PEGI 12 rating if the game includes sexual posturing or innuendo, a PEGI 16 rating if there is erotic nudity or sexual intercourse without visible genitals, or a PEGI 18 rating if there is explicit sexual activity in the game. Depictions of nudity in a non-sexual context do not require a specific age rating, and this descriptor would not be necessary.	PEGI 12 PEGI 16 PEGI 18
	Violence	2003	The game contains depictions of violence. In games rated PEGI 7 this can only be non-realistic or non-detailed violence. Games rated PEGI 12 can include violence in a fantasy environment or non-realistic violence towards human-like characters, whereas games rated PEGI 16 or 18 have increasingly more realistic-looking violence.	PEGI 7 PEGI 12 PEGI 16 PEGI 18
PEGI Online	Online	2003	May contain online interactions.	PEGI 3 PEGI 7 PEGI 12 PEGI 16 PEGI 18
	In-Game Purchases	2018	The game presents players with the options to purchase digital goods or services with real-world currency. These purchases include but are not limited to bonus levels, skins, surprise items, music, virtual coins and other forms of in-game currency, subscriptions, season passes and upgrades (e.g. to disable ads). This descriptor may be accompanied by an additional notice that the game includes random items such as loot boxes.	PEGI 3 PEGI 7 PEGI 12 PEGI 16 PEGI 18

==== Former ====
Portugal	Finland
2003–2021	2003–2007

In Portugal, the PEGI 3 and 7 categories were originally aligned with the age ratings of the film classification system – 4 and 6, respectively – to avoid confusion. Finland also used a modified scale, where the PEGI 12 and 16 categories became 11 and 15, respectively. Finland fully adopted PEGI on 1 January 2007, while Portugal fully adopted it on 14 January 2021, and the standard ratings were fully enforced as well in both countries at the respective dates.

== Rating process ==
To obtain the ratings for any piece of interactive software, the applicant submits the game with other supporting materials and completes a content declaration, all of which is evaluated by an independent administrator called the Netherlands Institute for the Classification of Audiovisual Media (NICAM). It is based on the Dutch Kijkwijzer system as well. Following the evaluation the applicant will receive a license to use the rating logos. If the applicant disagrees with the rating, they can ask for an explanation or make a complaint to the complaints board. Consumers may also make complaints to this board.

Although PEGI was established by an industry body (ISFE) the ratings are given by a body independent of the industry and the whole system is overseen by a number of different Boards and Committees. There is the PEGI Council, composed mainly by national representatives for PEGI, that recommends adjustments to the code in light of social, legal and technological developments. Members of the PEGI Council are recruited for their skill and experience from among parent/consumer body representatives, child psychologists, media specialists, civil servants, academics and legal advisers versed in the protection of minors in Europe.

There is also a Complaints Board with experts from various European countries. They deal with complaints related to breaches of requirements of the code of conduct or to age rating recommendations. Should a complaint be received from a consumer or publisher regarding a rating given to a game and no satisfactory settlement can be reached by the PEGI administrator through discussion, explanation or negotiation the complainant may formally request the Complaints Board to mediate. Three board members will then convene, hear the complaint and decide on a ruling. Publishers using the PEGI system are bound by the decision of the Complaints Board. Consequently, they are obliged to carry out any corrective actions required and, in cases of non-compliance, are subject to sanctions as laid out by the code.

== Global cooperation in IARC ==
In 2013, PEGI co-founded the International Age Rating Coalition with USK and the ESRB. IARC aims to streamline the rating of digitally distributed games and apps by providing a single online system that produces age ratings for all participating regions. By filling out one questionnaire, a publisher instantaneously receives ratings from PEGI, USK, ESRB, ACB and others.

== PEGI Online ==
In 2007, the PEGI Online division of PEGI was formed as an addition to the PEGI system for online games. Goals include giving young people in Europe improved protection against unsuitable online gaming content and educating parents on how to ensure safe online play. This project is supported directly by the European Commission:

PEGI On-line, which was launched in June 2007 and co-funded by the Safer Internet Programme, is the logical development of the PEGI system, designed to better protect young people against unsuitable gaming content and to help parents to understand the risks and potential for harm within this environment.

PEGI Online is based on four principles:

- The PEGI Online Safety Code and Framework Contract which is signed by all participants
- The PEGI Online Logo which will be displayed by holders of a licence
- The website for applicants and for the general public
- An independent administration, advice, and dispute settlement process

The licence to display the PEGI Online Logo is granted by the PEGI Online Administrator to any online gameplay service provider that meets the requirements set out in the PEGI Online Safety Code (POSC).

== Usage ==
PEGI is the standard age rating system for video games in 36 European countries but products with PEGI labels can be found across the globe alongside other rating systems as a result of import for linguistic reasons (e.g.: English versions in India, South Africa and the United Arab Emirates, Spanish or Portuguese versions in Latin America). The official status of PEGI ratings varies from country to country, depending on the way national legislation deals with age classification and the protection of minors. In some countries, PEGI is the de facto standard without specific regulation, other countries have officially acknowledged PEGI as the sole system for age ratings, while yet another number of countries have incorporated the PEGI rating system into laws governing the age classification of media, making the labels enforceable in retail.

=== Officially supports PEGI ===
Country	Status	Local system
Albania	Officially supports PEGI and is represented in the PEGI Council.	
(European Union) Austria	Officially supports PEGI. Although there is no specific legislative basis at the federal level, PEGI is legally adopted and enforceable in the federal states of Vienna and Carinthia. Other states do not prescribe a specific labelling system, with the exception of Salzburg, where USK labels are mandatory. Represented in the PEGI Council.	
(European Union) Belgium	Officially supports PEGI, but there is no specific legislative basis.	
Bosnia and Herzegovina	Officially supports PEGI and is represented in the PEGI Council.	
(European Union) Bulgaria	Officially supports PEGI and is represented in the PEGI Council, but there is no specific legislative basis.	
(European Union) Croatia	Officially support PEGI and PEGI age classifications are mandatory by law. However, distributors have to submit official announcement to national videogame commission (consisting of 3 people from HAVC, CGDA and AEM) to approve this rating (and de facto, release of videogame) for inside of Croatia. In case of disapproval, distributors have to highlight the change of age rating inside Croatia, according to decision of national videogame commission.	
(European Union) Cyprus	Officially supports PEGI, but there is no specific legislative basis. Northern Cyprus however does not officially support PEGI, but uses it. Nor does it have a legislative basis, even though it is internationally recognised as part of the Republic of Cyprus, some laws like those do not apply there. PEGI labels are used as most are imported from Turkey and the rest of the EU.	
(European Union) Czech Republic	Officially supports PEGI, but there is no specific legislative basis.	
(European Union) Denmark	Officially supports PEGI and is represented in the PEGI Council, but there is no specific legislative basis.	
(European Union) Estonia	Officially supports PEGI, but there is no specific legislative basis.	
(European Union) Finland	In Finland, games with PEGI ratings are exempt from mandatory classification with national age symbols. Both classifications are enforced by the penal code. Represented in the PEGI Council.	KAVI
(European Union) France	France has adopted legislation making classification of video games with age labels mandatory. Represented in the PEGI Council.	
(European Union) Greece	Officially supports PEGI and is represented in the PEGI Council, but there is no specific legislative basis.	
(European Union) Hungary	Officially supports PEGI. Games rated PEGI 18 are exempt from carrying Hungarian warning label "Not suitable for minors under 18" required by law on protecting minors.	
Iceland	PEGI is officially supported and age classifications are mandatory for video games by law.	
(European Union) Ireland	PEGI ratings are exempt from mandatory classification by IFCO, which adopts PEGI. IFCO is still legally empowered to ban certain video game content from the market. Represented in the PEGI Council.	
(European Union) Italy	Officially supports PEGI and is represented in the PEGI Council, but there is no specific legislative basis.	
Kosovo	Officially supports PEGI and is represented in the PEGI Council.	
(European Union) Latvia	Officially supports PEGI, but there is no specific legislative basis.	
(European Union) Lithuania	Lithuanian legislation has adopted PEGI which is exempt from mandatory classification with national age symbols. Both classifications are enforced by the penal code as of November 2010.	
(European Union) Luxembourg	Officially supports PEGI and is represented in the PEGI Council, but there is no specific legislative basis.	
(European Union) Malta	Officially supports PEGI and is represented in the PEGI Council, PEGI is the legally enforceable system for game classification in Malta since January 2016.	
Moldova	Officially supports PEGI and is represented in the PEGI Council.	
Montenegro	Officially supports PEGI and is represented in the PEGI Council.	
(European Union) Netherlands	PEGI is officially adopted and legislation is in place to enforce age classification in shops where video games are sold.	
North Macedonia	Officially supports PEGI and is represented in the PEGI Council.	
Norway	Officially supports PEGI and is represented in the PEGI Council, but there is no specific legislative basis.	
(European Union) Poland	Officially supports PEGI and is represented in the PEGI Council, but there is no specific legislative basis.	
(European Union) Portugal	PEGI has officially been adopted by the Portuguese Classification Board IGAC. Represented in the PEGI Council.	IGAC
(European Union) Romania	Officially supports PEGI, but there is no specific legislative basis.	
Serbia	Officially supports PEGI and is represented in the PEGI Council.	
(European Union) Slovakia	Officially supports PEGI, games which obtained PEGI rating are exempt from mandatory classification within national JSO rating system.	JSO
(European Union) Slovenia	Officially supports PEGI, but there is no specific legislative basis.	
(European Union) Spain	Officially supports PEGI and is represented in the PEGI Council, but there is no specific legislative basis.	
(European Union) Sweden	Officially supports PEGI and is represented in the PEGI Council, but there is no specific legislative basis.	
Switzerland	Officially supports PEGI, but there is no specific legislative basis.	
Ukraine	Officially supports PEGI and is represented in the PEGI Council.	
United Kingdom	Officially supports PEGI (PEGI is the legally enforceable system for game classification in the UK since 30 July 2012). Represented in the PEGI Council.	BBFC

=== Other countries ===
Country	Status	Local system
(European Union) Germany	The USK system is adopted and enforced. Games that are refused classification by the USK can be placed on the BzKJ index. PEGI is not recognised, although PEGI labelling can sometimes be found on retail games along with the USK rating, usually for titles printed for multiple markets. Not represented on the PEGI Council.	USK
Israel	PEGI has been adopted by law as the mandatory classification system for video games in Israel since 2007. Not represented on the PEGI Council.	
Russia	The RARS was system adopted in 2012, and enforced. All games, including imported ones, must have the RARS rating present. PEGI labels were originally used prior to 2012, but were never officially recognised.	RARS
Turkey	Uses PEGI labels in almost all foreign and Turkish-published video games inside the country, and so do the publishers, but does not have an official legislative basis regarding PEGI, and is not represented in the PEGI council.	

== Reception ==
=== Portrayals of gambling ===
Games containing minigames resembling casino games and gambling may be subject to heightened ratings due to "12" being the minimum for the "Gambling" descriptor. A 2016 re-release of Pokémon Red and Blue for Nintendo 3DS received a "12" rating (despite receiving the "E" rating from the U.S.-based ESRB) due to its "Game Corner" feature, which includes slot machines that can be played with in-game cash to earn coins redeemable for items. The European release of Pokémon Platinum (2009) was modified to remove the slot machines and replace them with non-interactive "game machines". As of 2020, PEGI's policies regarding content that resemble casino games and gambling have gotten stricter, with new games featuring the "Simulated Gambling" content descriptor automatically receiving an "18" rating from that point forward.

In 2019, the basketball video game NBA 2K20 received criticism for a trailer, focused on its "MyTeam" mode, which depicted chance-based minigames styled after casino games such as roulette, slots and pachinko. The visuals were considered to be sensitive due to increasing controversy over use of "loot box" mechanics in video games. After receiving an e-mail expressing concern over the trailer, PEGI clarified in response that the "Gambling" descriptor applies only to games that "teach" and "encourage" gambling, although admitting that the trailer's imagery may have been "too close for comfort" for some viewers, and that PEGI did not base its ratings decisions on singular trailers.

Balatro, a roguelike deck-building game, had its PEGI rating changed from 3+ to 18+ shortly after its February 2024 release due to perceived gambling imagery, and was pulled from some online stores. Playstack, the game's publisher, argued that while the game was based on poker and features poker hands, it does not feature or encourage gambling. Balatro was restored to the Nintendo eShop in Europe, Australia and New Zealand on 8 March with the higher 18+ rating. In a Reddit AMA, Balatro developer Localthunk criticised PEGI for re-rating the game after its release, writing "I still believe that the rating is unwarranted, but there is some gray area for interpretation from PEGI and at this point it is what it is. I think the one thing I am most disappointed by is the fact that other games with actual gambling mechanics aren't rated the same way because of their appearance/theme." PEGI reclassified Balatro as well as Luck Be a Landlord, which, Balatro was inspired by, to PEGI 12 in February 2025, saying that the gambling aspects were mitigated by the fantasy nature of gameplay, and for future games, they will devise a more granular approach when considering gambling-like elements in games.

== See also ==
- Video game content rating system
