= Hoepla =

Dutch television series

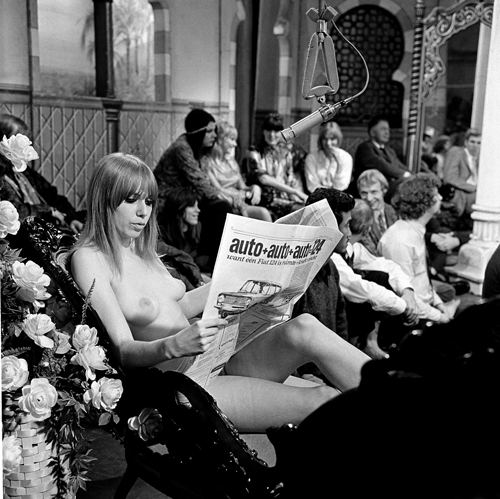
- Phil Bloom reading the newspaper on the set of Hoepla in 1967
- Genre: Avant-garde; Music; Satire; Talk show
- Created by: Wim T. Schippers; Wim van der Linden; Willem de Ridder; Hans Verhagen
- Written by: Wim T. Schippers; Wim van der Linden; Willem de Ridder; Hans Verhagen
- Country of origin: Netherlands
- Original language: Dutch
- No. of seasons: 1
- No. of episodes: 4

Original release
- Network: VPRO (Nederland 2)
- Release: 28 July – 23 November 1967

Hoepla ("Whoops") is a Dutch experimental cultural television show broadcast in 1967. It aimed at a young teenage audience and was notable for being unpredictable and risky in its subject matter, featuring reports, performances, declarations, and interviews that tied in with the subversive atmosphere of the Provo movement. Three episodes were made for the VPRO, and the show caused controversy when a naked woman, Phil Bloom, appeared on the show, being the first time this happened on Dutch television. (Note: Critics differentiate between the brief nudity in Hoepla, characterized by its inactivity, and the first scene involving a naked actress (Pleuni Touw) acting: that occurred in 1974's De Stille Kracht.) A fourth episode was taped but did not air until 2008. The show was written and produced by the team of Wim T. Schippers, Wim van der Linden, Willem de Ridder, and Hans Verhagen.

== Background ==
Hoepla was made by and for a teenage audience (the post-World War II generation), at a time (the late 1960s) when Dutch culture was one of "boredom and obedience". That segment of the population had already clashed with the establishment over a VARA television show that ran from 1963 to 1966, Zo is het toevallig ook nog eens een keer, "the most despised and controversial satirical TV program ever". That show, based on the BBC program That Was the Week That Was, had aired a parody of the Lord's Prayer ("Give us this day our daily television"), on 4 January 1964, in a skit called "Beeldreligie" ("image worship") which led to criticism from television viewers and politicians; questions were asked in parliament, and one of the show's presenters, the wildly popular and by no means rebellious Mies Bouwman, was forced to resign from the show after receiving threats. Police were called in to protect the studio during subsequent tapings. Like Zo is het toevallig, Hoepla would tackle controversial topics such as "the colonial past, the royal family, and sexuality" in a social system where "authority and community were central".

== Hoepla ==
According to Hans Verhagen, one of Hoepla's writers and directors, the show was intended to operate on a "wavelength" which had hitherto not been tried on television. That Hoepla was in tune with happening developments in popular culture was indicated by its guest list: musical performances were given by some of the era's hippest artists, including Soft Machine (episode 2), The Mothers of Invention (ep. 2), and The Jimi Hendrix Experience (ep. 3), and there were declarations by and interviews with such idols as Eric Clapton and Mick Jagger. The Experience performed "Foxy Lady", "Catfish Blues", and "Purple Haze" in the studio on 10 November 1967, before playing an evening show in Rotterdam; that rendition of "Catfish Blues" was reissued on the 1994 compilation album Blues. (The section with "Foxy Lady" appears to be lost, and might have been stolen from the archive by a Hendrix fan.)

=== First episode ===
The first episode aired on 28 July 1967 and immediately redrew the earlier battle lines familiar from the "Beeldreligie" controversy. Opposition against the show was mobilized by the national daily newspaper De Telegraaf, who had complained earlier that Zo is het toevallig was a waste of the public's television licence, and published pictures of the cast and crew of Zo is het toevallig to accompany its coverage of Hoepla, to remind its audience of what was at stake. Notable sections of the show included an interview of Pete Townshend by Hans Verhagen and the appearance of Phil Bloom, naked except for a strategically placed garland of plastic flowers, during a performance by the singer Teddy Lee J. (a 25-year-old singer from Suriname) who sang "I'm a sexman" Verhagen paid Bloom 150 guilders for her work, and the VPRO lost 67 members.

=== Second episode ===
For the second episode, the writers had upped the ante, and got Phil Bloom to appear completely naked. During a skit, she is reading a newspaper, sitting on a sofa; she reads, out loud, a review of the first episode of Hoepla that appeared in the Protestant daily Trouw and when she lowers the newspaper she is shown to be completely naked. But when photos of the taping leaked out and were published, the scene was shot again; this time Bloom is on a chair (likewise naked) reading another Hoepla article, this time from Het Vrije Volk, the social democratic daily paper, which states that the VPRO cut Bloom's scene after the photos leaked out. As soon as the scene is over, the screen shows the VPRO's postal address, to accommodate those who wished to cancel their membership.

Reactions were predictable: Telegraaf columnist Leo Riemens referred to the show as "filth" and "pornography", and letters to the various editors struck the same chords. Other newspapers, though, were more positive, and the commentary in parliament by SGP representative Cor van Dis Sr. (the Reformed Political Party is a small, orthodox, Calvinist party), who strongly criticized the Minister of Culture Marga Klompé for allowing women to be degraded, did not meet with approval in parliament or the press. The VPRO anticipated angry letters from some of its members, and had prepared a standard reply in which the organization said it understood that not everyone would agree with the show's message, but that it wanted to be an "open organization" which could adjust to the rapidly changing attitudes toward society's norms.

=== Third episode ===
The third episode was taped on 10 November 1967 but did not air until 23 November, minus two controversial items that the VPRO cut: a section called "Vleesch" (an old-fashioned spelling for "vlees", "meat"), which reported on the last five minutes in an abattoir of a cow's life, and a section in which a model performs a striptease over an audio tape of Dutch prime minister Piet de Jong, responding to the questions asked in parliament by C. N. van Dis about Hoepla The "Vleesch" section had been moved from the second to the third episode; after a committee of child psychiatrists had delved into the matter, it was approved as safe for children but was again moved, to the fourth episode, which never aired. The section was conceived by Hans Verhagen and vegetarian Wim T. Schippers; Wim van der Linden filmed the section, and afterward became a vegetarian as well. The story on the missing episode was reported on Vlees Magazine ("Meat Magazine"), since it and the attendant video footage provided insight into slaughter procedures in the 1960s.

=== Fourth episode ===
A fourth episode was supposed to air on 8 January 1968 (and apparently a record number of people had tuned in to watch it), but it was decided on that very day to cancel it, with the explanation given that Phil Bloom had been photographed by Playboy during rehearsals, and such commercial ventures were not allowed on public television. The VPRO told the show's makers on 15 January that there would be no more new episodes. The tapes for the fourth episode were discovered early in the 21st century, unedited; they were newly edited and aired in January 2008.

VPRO had a back-up plan. Its slot on Nederland 2 used to broadcast Hoepla would be filled with an edition of Young People's Concerts in case of cancellation.
