= Rembo & Rembo =

- Created by: Theo Wesselo; Maxim Hartman
- Country of origin: Netherlands
- Original language: Dutch
- No. of seasons: 5
- No. of episodes: 45

Production
- Running time: 13 minutes (season 2); 2 1/2 minutes (season 3); 7 minutes (seasons 4 and 5)
- Production companies: Hootchie Cootchie Cartoons; VPRO

Original release
- Network: VPRO (Nederland 2)
- Release: 4 October 1987 – January 13, 1990
- Network: VPRO (Nederland 3)
- Release: March 28, 1993 – 26 January 1997

Rembo & Rembo is a surreal Dutch television series for children, created by Theo Wesselo and Maxim Hartman. It aired on VPRO's Villa Achterwerk from 1987 to 1997, running for five seasons and a total of 45 episodes. Its slogan was "Rembo & Rembo; bovenmaatse humor van de 1 na bovenste plank" (Rembo & Rembo, oversized humor from the shelf just below the top shelf").

== Premise ==
The series consists of a succession of sketches played by the two Rembos (both creators of the series). They use crude language and inappropriate acts. The sketches were presented from behind a small yellow table in the studio.

== Production ==
Rembo came from an idea Wesselo had at the VPRO in the mid-1980s. He and Hartman were creating a series of sketches to the broadcaster and they decided what would be produced. Wesselo did not want to produce a children's program, but ended up doing it. Later, the VPRO interfered in the creative process and Wesselo had to end the series.

In April 2015, Rembo & Rembo was uploaded onto official VPRO profiles, but not entirely. According to Wesselo, he removed the introductions and jokes involving doctors.

== Controversies ==
In the spring of 2004, Kijkwijzer fined the VPRO in a sum of €1000 under the grounds that a Rembo & Rembo sketch was deemed violent. In it, a sister beats her younger brother after he grabbed his toys. NICAM, which runs the ratings system, said that the broadcaster should have indicated that the series was rated ages 6 and up, and not for all ages.
