= Kijkwijzer =

Media rating system in the Netherlands and Belgium

The Kijkwijzer (French: Cinecheck; German: Cinecheck) is a film rating tool originally from the Netherlands that can be used to check whether watching a film, television programme or computer game could be harmful to children. The tool is also the guideline for possible criminal liability in the category "from 16 years" and can be used by the judge. In 2011, the tenth anniversary was extensively celebrated with various YouTube videos and questions, for example through a study by the Jeugdjournaal. To be able to make a realistic assessment of whether to assign a certain pictogram to films and television programmes, Kijkwijzer uses a uniform questionnaire. Since 2020, the system has also been in use in Belgium, where it is referred to in French and German as "Cinecheck". In addition, the age classifications of 14 years and 18 years were added in 2020, of which the classification of "18 years and older" is not enforced by law and can be viewed from the age of 16.

== Description ==
Since 2002, the Kijkwijzer has been determined by the Netherlands Institute for the Classification of Audiovisual Media (NICAM), or at least, film distributors do this themselves after training from NICAM. Kijkwijzer advice is applied to almost all audiovisual products offered in the Netherlands, from television programs and cinema films to films on DVD and video. The pictograms appear on the screen at the beginning of a television programme/film and are in broadcasting guides and on packaging. The Commissariat for the Media supervises the implementation of Kijkwijzer. Kijkwijzer does not judge the content or quality of television programmes or films. The preferences and standards of parents differ too much for that. Kijkwijzer only warns of potentially harmful images in television programmes or films. Initially, the starting point was that parents themselves are responsible for what their children are allowed to see. The government has linked a legal provision to the various age limits. Kijkwijzer is the successor and an important extension of the Film Screening Act, by expanding it to include the categories of violence, fear, sex, discrimination, drug and alcohol abuse and coarse language. In addition to audiovisual media, games (computer games) are assessed using the same standards by the equivalent organization PEGI. There are plans to also include the internet under the provisions of Kijkwijzer and PEGI.

The age with the signs can also be seen on almost all channels via teletext page 282.

At first, only ages such as: All ages (AL), (MG)6, 12 and 16 years were discussed. MG stood for viewing along desired

Later, Kijkwijzer found that the gap between 6 and 12 years was quite large. Because of this, Kijkwijzer introduced the category the age 9 years and older. In 2020, Kijkwijzer introduced the categories 14 years and older for a similar reason, and in addition, a category 18 years and older was also introduced.

== Advice and prohibitions ==
AL (all ages): not harmful.

From 6 years: watching recommended for very young children.

From 9 years: harmful for young teenagers.

From 12 years: images may be undesirable if no adult is watching.

From 14 years: films with realistic intense action.

From 16 years: legal prohibition is in the Criminal Code.

From 18 years: not suitable for children.

The categories of 12, 14, 16 and 18 years are subject to the prohibition provision of article 240a of the Criminal Code, whereby the category under 16 is punishable under this provision. The classification from 18 years has no legal character and can only be enforced if the viewers are under 16 years of age.

The makers of the films may also determine their own colour for the age. On the back of blu-ray and DVDs with a dark cover it is usually red. There are also separate colours: for example, on Nickelodeon this is orange.

These are allocated to television programmes, DVD's and cinema films. Television programmes with the qualification 'AL', '6' and '9' may be broadcast at any time of the day. Programmes from the age of '12' may not start before 20:00, programmes with '16' may not start before 22:00. If a programme is broadcast too early, the broadcaster may receive a hefty fine. To be able to broadcast films and series earlier, the commercial channels of RTL and SBS regularly choose to broadcast censored versions: on the Kijkwijzer website these programmes can be recognised by the designation RTL version or SBS version.

== Content descriptors ==
In addition to the above ratings, Kijkwijzer assesses films, TV programs and online video content based on seven content characteristics, which may mean that the film will receive a certain warning (by means of a pictogram):

Pictogram	Content descriptor	Active since
A word-vomiting figure	Coarse language (Dutch: Grof taalgebruik)	2003
A black figure against a background of white figures	Discrimination (Dutch: Discriminatie)	2003
Syringe	Drug and/or alcohol use	2003
Spider	Fear/Horror (Dutch: Angst)	2001
Two pairs of feet intertwined	Sex (Dutch: Seks)	2003
Fist	Violence (Dutch: Geweld)	2003
A caution sign in front of an energetic figure	Dangerous challenges and stunts (Dutch: Gevaarlijk gedrag)	2020

== Legal prohibition "from 16 years" ==
The advisory nature of the Kijkwijzer to parents and educators initially stopped at the age limit of 16 years. Classification in the category "from 16 years" entails a legal prohibition for cinema operators to admit young people under the age of sixteen, as well as a prohibition on the sale and rental of DVDs etc. to these young people.

The legal prohibition is regulated in Article 151e of the Criminal Code:

Anyone who provides, offers or shows a visual representation as referred to in Article 239, third paragraph, or an object, the display of which may be considered harmful to persons under the age of sixteen, to a person under the age of sixteen shall be punished with a prison sentence of up to one year or a fine of the fourth category.

A violation of Article 151e is a criminal offence (and not a offence). A conviction for committing a crime also results in a criminal record for the perpetrator. The original intention of the previous Article 240a was to protect young people from pornography. This protection has been expanded to include the categories of violence, fear, sex, discrimination, drug and alcohol abuse and coarse language. In the event of prosecution, it is important for the judge to know whether the screening is considered harmful to persons under the age of sixteen. NICAM has made this clear with the material content of the Kijkwijzer.

In case of doubt about the age, the cinema operator may – given the punishability – ask for identification or refuse access. Video stores, shops and libraries also have to deal with the Criminal Code and may not sell or rent DVDs (or games) to children under the specified age limits. Incidentally, a game or a film with an 18+ classification by the European PEGI or the Dutch Kijkwijzer may be sold to young people aged 16 and over.

The recommended age stated in the Kijkwijzer does not mean that a television programme or film is suitable for all children from that age (for example, a film may be too difficult, but not harmful). The advice also does not constitute a judgement on the quality of the television programme or film.In the Netherlands, the Kijkwijzer system is used, which is executed by the Netherlands Institute for the Classification of Audiovisual Media (NICAM). Kijkwijzer is an advisory system for parents, but Dutch law also has a legal provision for public spaces, including cinemas. Children under the specified age limits are only admitted to films carrying an age limit of 6, 9, 12, or 14 if accompanied by an adult. In the case of "16" and "18" rated films, admission is legally prohibited for children under 16 years of age in both categories (a person aged 16 or 17 may rent, see or be admitted to "18" rated films) per section 240a of the Dutch Criminal Code.

=== Covenant (2009) ===
In February 2009 a Covenant was signed between the branches, NICAM and the Ministry of Justice. This should lead to better enforcement of the age limits for audiovisual products in cinemas, shops, video stores and libraries. This covenant includes the agreement that the age limit of 16 years will be enforced. In case of doubt, the age will always be asked for the age limit of 12 years, and the answer will be considered correct. The Minister has explicitly stated in the Covenant that the provisions were established as a result of the current political course.

The Ministry of Justice has agreed with NICAM:

- The covenant partners undertake to make an effort to achieve compliance with the age limits of 16 and 18 (PEGI) of at least 70%.
- For the classification 12 years, which cannot be determined by means of an identity document, the age will always be asked in case of doubt; the answer is assumed to be correct.

Critics of this policy believe that the government is playing the role of a "surrogate parent" when enforcing it and experience the role of the government for this category as patronizing (for parents and guardians). Politicians have also joined in this discussion.

Minister Hirsch Ballin referred to the explanatory memorandum which also indicated that existing restrictions in the Film Screenings Act regarding the accessibility of films for young people should be unabated recorded in the NICAM regulations. The Film Screenings Act had two age limits, 12 and 16 years. This policy was confirmed again by letter from the Minister dated 21 November 2003. Despite the explicitly stated age limit of 16 years and older in the Criminal Code, the government has indicated that the relevant article of law (then article 240a of the Criminal Code) also applies to other ages.

The exception for cinemas is that children who are "one or two years" younger than the age limit of 12 years may be admitted under the supervision of a parent. This means that an 11-year-old child may be admitted to a film with an age limit of 12 years under the supervision of a parent.

=== Change in the admission policy of cinemas (2012) ===
On 22 August 2012, the State Secretary for Security and Justice sent a letter to the House of Representatives, in which he announced, among other things, a change in the admission policy of cinemas. In short, the admission policy will be as follows:

At 16: No 16, no admission. Not even accompanied by a parent.

At 12: Children under 12 may not be admitted without an adult. Children under 12 accompanied by an adult may be admitted. The cinema staff will point out the classification.

=== Enforcement of compliance with age limits ===
Inspectors from the Telecom Agency check, on behalf of the Ministry of Justice, whether article 240a of the Criminal Code is being complied with by sellers, lessors and cinema operators. The Kijkwijzer and PEGI (for games) classification systems are used for enforcement. The Telecom Agency carries out national inspections at, for example, toy stores, department stores, CD and DVD stores, game shops, video stores, film houses, cinemas, game events, etc. The inspectors are special investigating officers and can draw up a report if they find anything.

=== Libraries ===
The 2009 Covenant pays special attention to self-service systems for lending films and games in libraries (affiliated with the VOB). Where possible, the current systems will be adjusted in such a way that if a minor's library card states an age lower than the applicable age classification of the product to be borrowed, the loan will be automatically blocked.

== See also ==
- PEGI - European video game rating system
