= VPRO =

Dutch public broadcaster

Omroepvereniging VPRO
- Current logo, in use since 2021
- Type: Public broadcaster
- Country: Netherlands
- Founded: 29 May 1926; 100 years ago
- TV stations: NPO 1, NPO 2, NPO 3
- Radio stations: NPO Radio 1, NPO 3FM, NPO Klassiek
- Parent: NPO
- Key people: Zakia Guernina (CEO); Roel Burgman (CEO)
- Former names: Vrijzinnig Protestantse Radio Omroep
- Digital channel: 3voor12
- Official website: Official website

The VPRO (stylized vpro; originally an acronym for Vrijzinnig Protestantse Radio Omroep, lit. 'Liberal Protestant Radio Broadcaster', nowadays known as Omroepvereniging VPRO) is a Dutch public broadcaster and a member of the Dutch public broadcasting system. The VPRO presents itself as a progressive broadcaster and mainly produces liberal, thought-provoking programmes focusing on society, culture and the arts.

The VPRO was founded on 29 May 1926 by the liberal Protestant section of Dutch society, which wanted a radio broadcaster that would reflect liberal Protestant views and perspectives. The VPRO thus became one of the Netherlands' many broadcasters.

The VPRO made a cultural shift in the late 1960s, becoming a progressive broadcaster. This meant a departure from their previous, more Protestant image. Since then, the VPRO has become known for its many artistic and liberal programmes. The number of members of the VPRO grew substantially in the 1980s, and since the 1990s the VPRO has been one of the Netherlands' best-known established broadcasters.

In 2016, the VPRO partnered with the humanist broadcaster HUMAN. In 2022, the collaborative organization VPRO-HUMAN was founded. The two broadcasters remain independent, but they work together in some areas.

Like all public broadcasters in the Netherlands, VPRO does not have its own television channel. VPRO often cooperates with foreign broadcasters such as WDR, the BBC, and Arte.

== History ==
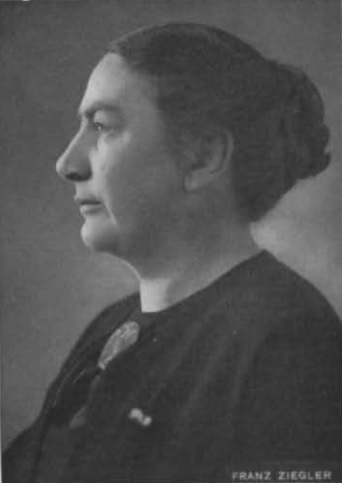
Nicolette Bruining, one of the founders of the V.P.R.O. and chairwoman of V.P.R.O. from 1926 to 1956

In the 1920s, the first radio broadcasting companies were established in the Netherlands. These broadcasting companies were divided into pillars, in which each religious and ideological group had its own facilities, including its own radio broadcasting company. A small pillorized group in the Netherlands were the liberal Protestants, who were followers of liberal Protestantism and believed that people should allow their Christian faith to be strongly determined by an undogmatic attitude, in which freedom of thought and belief based on one's own insights is central. This group of Protestants were a minority within the Protestant pillar in the Netherlands, but they did want the opportunity to make their voices heard. That is why the Vrijzinnig Protestantse Radio Omroep (V.P.R.O.) was founded on May 29, 1926 by the Central Committee for Liberal Protestantism. What distinguished the broadcaster from the Protestant broadcaster N.C.R.V. (founded in 1925) was that the programming of the V.P.R.O. was based on humanism and liberal Protestantism, which meant that there was a 'general' programming.

The V.P.R.O. had a hard time in its early years. Because the V.P.R.O. was founded later than the other broadcasters, the broadcaster had little airtime and had to change channels often. This changed in the early 1930s, when the Zendtijdbesluit came into effect. The Zendtijdbesluit was introduced by the Dutch government to fairly distribute radio airtime among the broadcasters. As a result, the V.P.R.O. received more airtime than it had previously. At the same time, the V.P.R.O. strongly opposed the pillorized broadcasting system in the Netherlands. They were in favour of a national broadcaster. But because there was no support for this idea among the other broadcasters and politicians, the V.P.R.O. decided to adhere to the Zendtijdbesluit and remained an independent broadcaster.

=== VPRO during WWII ===
On March 9, 1941, the V.P.R.O. and the other radio broadcasters were closed down by the German occupiers and replaced by the Rijksradio Omroep, which broadcast national socialist propaganda. Before that, the V.P.R.O. was able to continue broadcasting its programs from 1940 to 1941. This was because the radio broadcasters, including the V.P.R.O., did what the German occupiers wanted from the start, to prevent their broadcaster from being closed down. For example, the V.P.R.O. had to submit its programming to a censorship committee, which determined what would and would not be included in the broadcast, and the broadcaster also dismissed Jewish employees, in order to meet the wishes of the Germans. In addition, the V.P.R.O. broadcasting guide contained bad things about Jews. According to the V.P.R.O., it did this because of the liberalism that the broadcaster was pursuing. The broadcaster believed that everyone should have a say, including national socialists. Despite the obedience, the V.P.R.O. was dissolved in 1941. The Rijksradio Omroep took over part of the broadcaster's programming. In 1947, the V.P.R.O. was re-established after the government had made a failed attempt to form a national broadcaster.

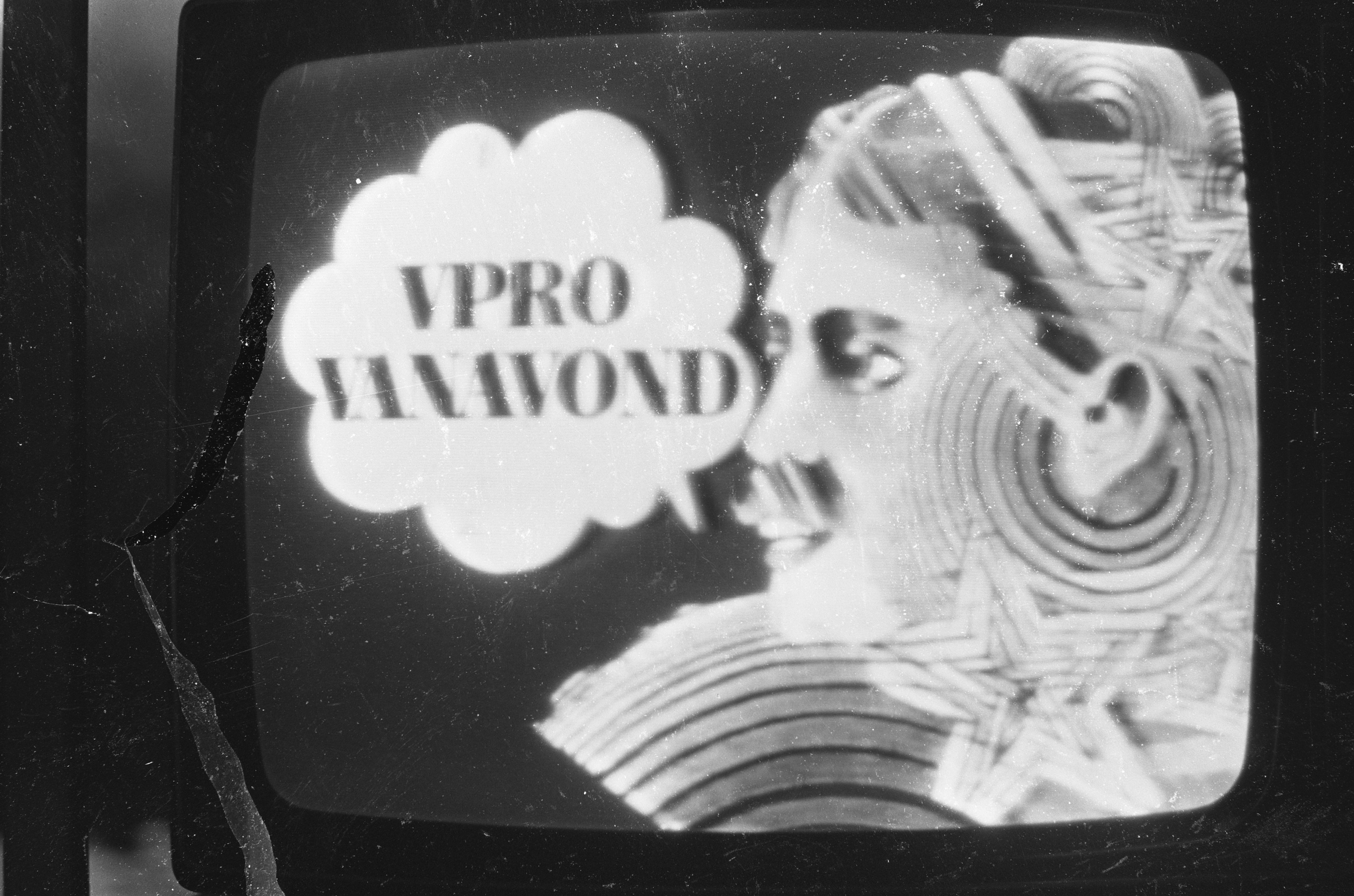
Opening of a VPRO program in 1973

=== 1950s to present ===
In 1951, television was introduced in the Netherlands. The broadcasting companies A.V.R.O, K.R.O, N.C.R.V and V.A.R.A were the first broadcasting companies to start broadcasting on television, and together they founded the Nederlandse Televisie Stichting (NTS). The V.P.R.O became a member of the NTS in 1952 and has also been making television programs since then.

The V.P.R.O. underwent a cultural shift in the late 1960s. Due to the change in mentality that arose in the Netherlands in the 1960s, a new generation of programme makers joined the broadcaster who were supporters of the flower power movement. They managed to convince the broadcaster's board and the members of the V.P.R.O. to distance themselves from Protestantism and to become a progressive broadcaster. The name of the broadcaster was changed to VPRO, which meant that the broadcaster distanced itself from the original abbreviation.

By the early 1970s, the VPRO was still under C status, alongside TROS.

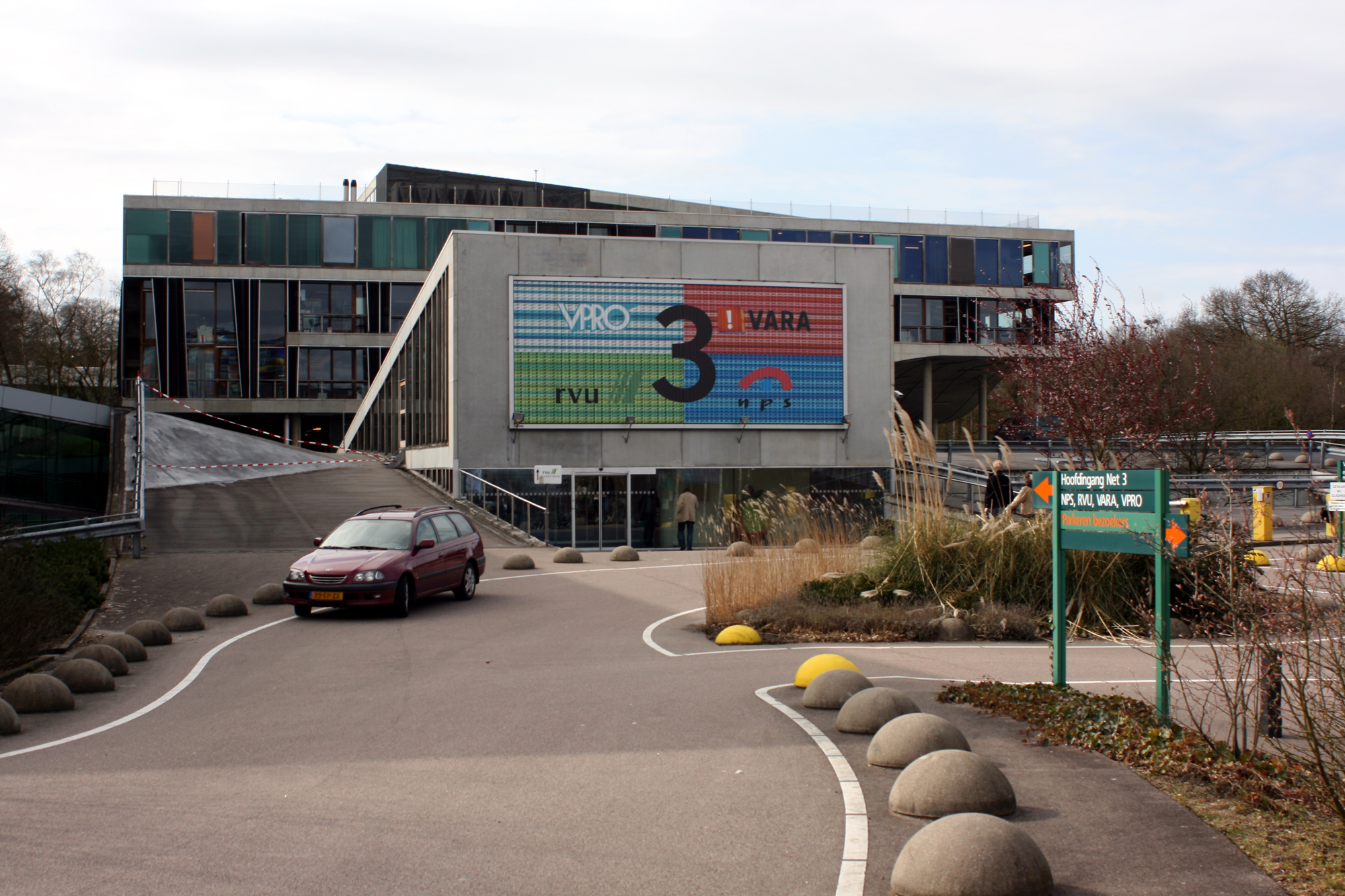
Shared headquarters of the broadcasters VPRO, VARA, RVU and NPS in 2007. Nowadays the broadcasters NTR, BNNVARA and HUMAN are located in the same building as the VPRO.

In 1984, the VPRO achieved B status, because the broadcaster had enough members (in the Netherlands, a public broadcaster must have enough members for airtime). Partly due to the amendment of the Omroepwet, the VPRO was able to grow into a large, established broadcaster. This was because the broadcaster gained many members, which allowed it to achieve A status in 1991.

In 2010, the public broadcasters in the Netherlands had to make cutbacks due to the policy of the Rutte I cabinet. Because less money was given to the broadcasters, some broadcasters decided to work together or merge. In 2011, the VPRO was in talks with the AVRO about a possible merger of both broadcasters. In 2011, VPRO announced that it did not want to merge with AVRO, because it wanted to remain independent. Since 2016, VPRO has been working with humanist broadcaster Omroep HUMAN. Since 2016, the broadcasters have been producing radio and television programs together. In 2021, VPRO and HUMAN decided to work together in the collaborative organization VPRO-HUMAN. In 2022, VPRO-HUMAN was recognized by Minister Arie Slob of Education and Culture.

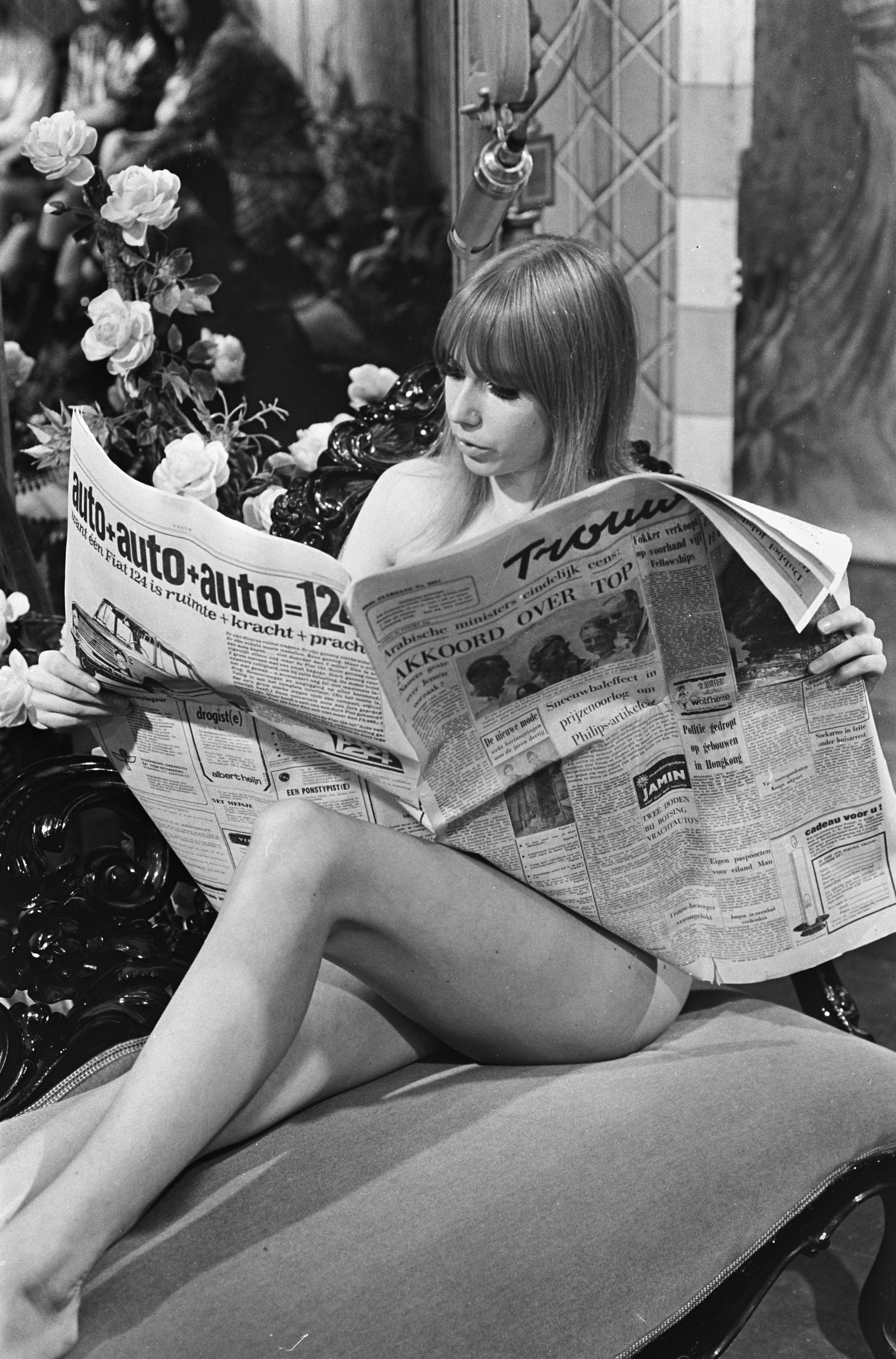
Model Phil Bloom reads the Trouw newspaper naked in the television program Hoepla (1967)

== Television and radio programs ==
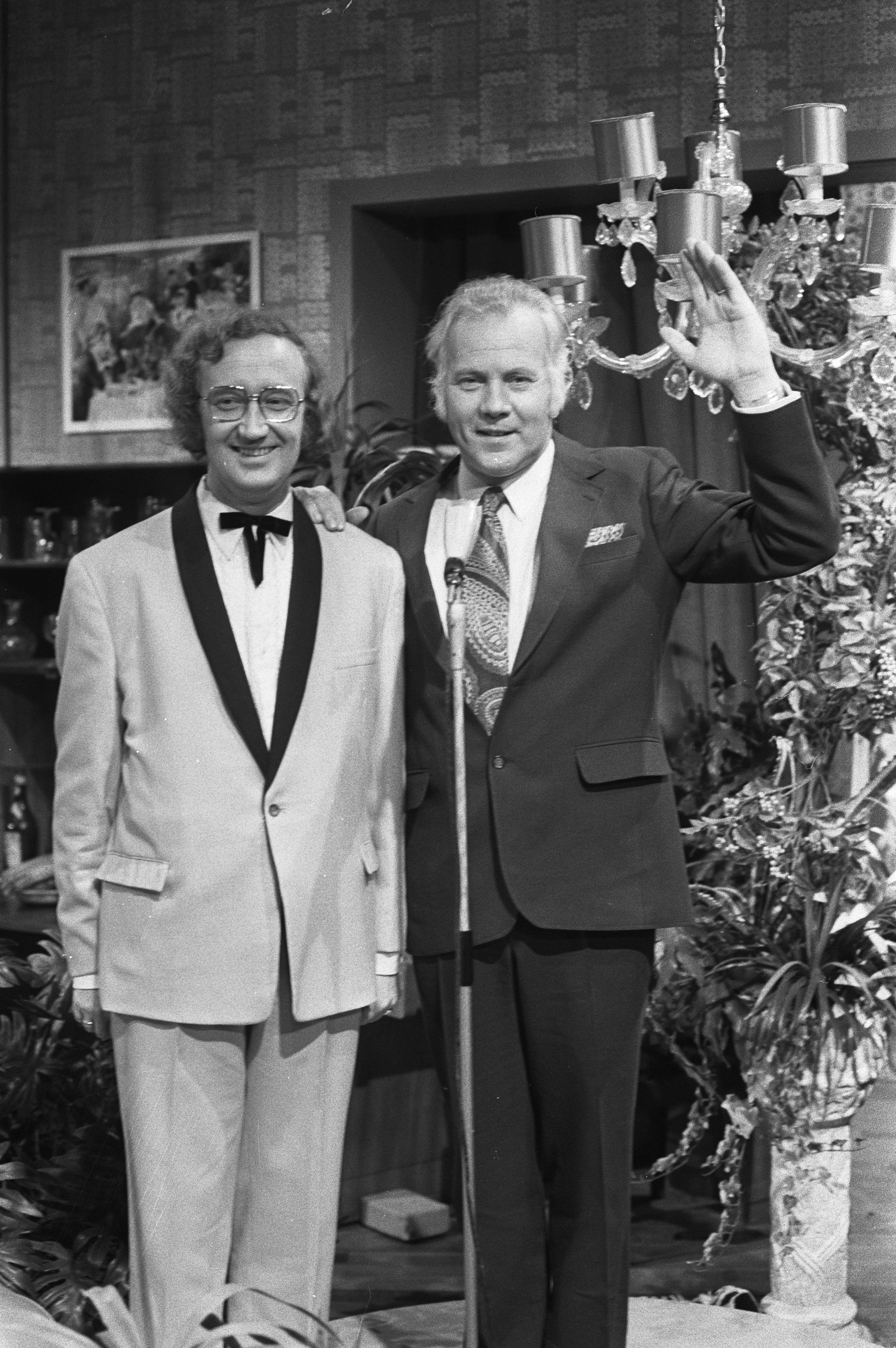
Barend Servet (left) and Fred Haché (right) in the Fred Haché Show (1972)

=== Television ===
In 1967, the VPRO made the youth program Hoepla. The program was taken off the air after three episodes, because there were complaints about a broadcast in which model Phil Bloom read the Dutch newspaper Trouw naked. It was the first time that female nudity was seen on Dutch television.

From 1970 to 1990, artist Wim T. Schippers made many absurdist programs at the VPRO, which were also very controversial. A well-known example of such a program is the Fred Haché Show, which was broadcast by the VPRO from 1971 to 1972. The program often discussed taboo subjects, such as sex and religion, and satirically ridiculed subjects such as the Dutch royal family. The program regularly caused controversy. For example, in 1972 the program makers received many threatening letters because many people found the broadcast in which Queen Juliana was peeling Brussels sprouts distasteful.

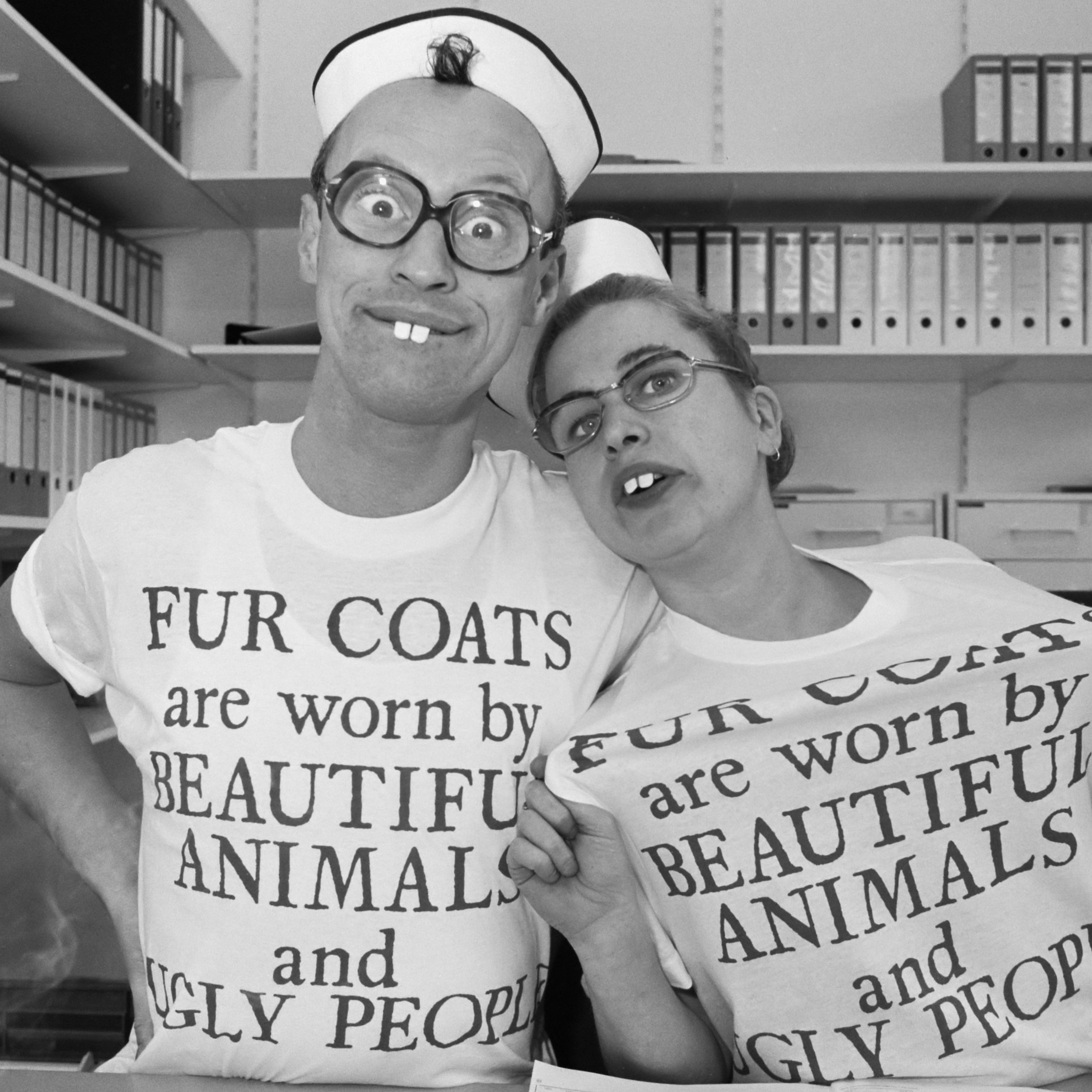
The children's programme Theo & Thea (1988)

Another well-known VPRO program maker was the duo Van Kooten en De Bie. The duo made many programs for the broadcaster from 1974 to 1998, in which they created satire through sketches and characters. Their best-known program is Keek op de Week (1988 – 1993). The television program covered the current affairs of the past week, through satirical commentary and sketches. What also made the program unique was that the program used a chroma key, which made it seem as if Van Kooten en De Bie were talking to their own characters via the screen. The VPRO is also known for its satirical programs. In addition to the programs by Van Kooten en De Bie, other well-known satirical programs are the absurdist Jiskefet and the late-night talk show Zondag met Lubach.

Since 1984, the VPRO had sufficient funding to produce children's programmes. In VPRO children's programming, children were taken seriously, and the focus shifted more to the child's soul. Programmes such as Rembo & Rembo, Villa Achterwerk and Theo & Thea are examples of such programmes. The VPRO also produced many documentaries for children that were also about children, such as the documentary Anders dan Anders (1997 – 1999), about children growing up in special circumstances.

Since 1988, the VPRO has produced the programme VPRO Zomergasten, in which a guest is interviewed for three hours and shows fragments to form his ideal television evening. The programme is broadcast every summer and has had the spin-off Wintergasten since 2020, in which international guests are interviewed.

Since 2002, the VPRO has broadcast the programme VPRO Tegenlicht. The documentary programme often deals with political, economic and scientific themes. One of their best-known documentaries is Wiki's Waarheid, which examines how reliable Wikipedia is.

From 2008 to 2021, the VPRO produced the journalistic program Metropolis. The program shows the world through the eyes of local journalists, who search for answers to universal questions and themes in their own city or country. Since 2022, Omroep HUMAN has broadcast the program.

=== Radio ===
Logo of 3voor12

On the radio, the VPRO produced many journalistic programs, which were regularly made in an experimental and improvisational manner. Themes that were regularly discussed were sex and the royal family. A well-known VPRO program on the radio is Marathoninterview, in which a guest is interviewed for three hours. This format was later also used for the television program Zomergasten. The journalistic programs of the VPRO are mainly broadcast on NPO Radio 1.

In addition, the VPRO mainly focuses on alternative, pop and modern music. This started in the radio programs of Wim Noordhoek and Jan Donkers, among others. The music programs of the VPRO are broadcast on the radio on NPO 3FM (modern music) and on NPO Klassiek (classical music).

In 1998, the pop music platform 3voor12 was founded. 3voor12 is broadcast by the VPRO on radio station NPO 3FM. In addition, the platform has an extensive website on which interviews, album reviews and festival reports appear.

== List of VPRO television and radio programs ==
Logo of the radio program Argos, a program produced by both VPRO and Omroep HUMAN

Here is an overview of well-known VPRO television and radio programs:

=== Television programs ===
- 24 uur met... (2008–2016)
- Achterwerk in de kast (1980–1990)
- Andere Tijden (2000–present)
- Boeken (2005–present)
- Buitenhof (1995–present)
- Draadstaal (2007–2009)
- De Fred Haché Show (1971–1972)
- Hier is... Adriaan van Dis (1983–1992)
- Hoepla (1967)
- Jiskefet (1990–2005)
- Keek op de Week (1988–1993)
- Metropolis (2008–2021)
- Van Oekel's Discohoek (1974–1975)
- Purno de Purno (1989–1996; 2006–2007)
- Rembo & Rembo (1987–1997)
- Tegenlicht (2002–present)
- Theo & Thea (1985–1989)
- Vrije Geluiden (2001–2019)
- Wintergasten (2005–present)
- Villa Achterwerk (1984–2014)
- Zomergasten (1988–present)
- Zondag met Lubach (2014–2021)

=== Radio programs ===
- 3voor12 (1998–present)
- Argos (1992–present)
- Bureau Buitenland (2022–present)
- De Avonden (1995–2013)
- Een Uur Cultuur (2023–present)
- Een uur Ischa (1974–1995)
- Marathoninterview (1986–present)
- Nooit meer slapen (2014–present)
- OVT (1992–present)
- Radio Bergeijk (2001–2007)
- Ronflonflon (1984–1991)

== Logos ==
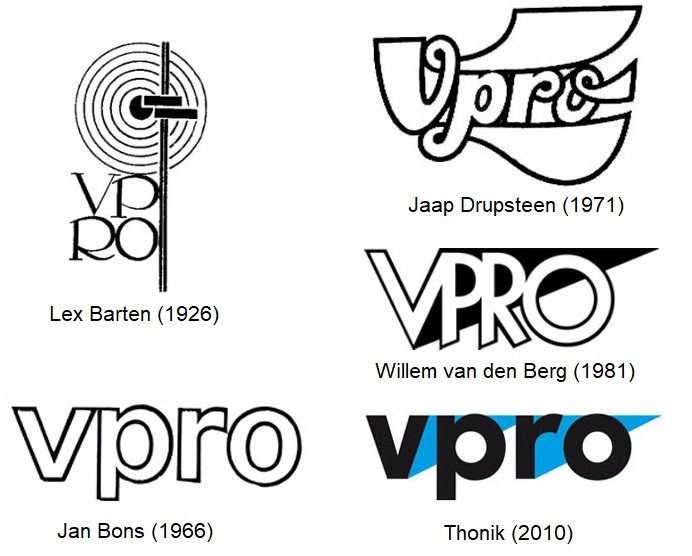
Overview of VPRO logos

Lex Barten designed the first logo for the VPRO in 1926: the four letters as two pairs under each other, with a transmission mast and round transmission beams. Jan Bons designed a logo with a modest word mark based on Helvetica letters in 1966. In 1971, Jaap Drupsteen designed the next logo for the VPRO: an American-looking vignette with large, elegant letters in soft shapes, inspired by the Coca-Cola logo. After ten years, it was Willem van den Berg who, in response to the previous logo, created a visual mark in 1981 with razor-sharp letters on an equally sharp V-shadow. This logo was in use for 28 years. On 24 August 2010, the VPRO introduced its current design. Design agency Thonik, which was responsible for the design, also gave the logo numerous appearances. In 2021, the logo was renewed to the current logo.

== Trivia ==
VPRO ident from 2010, in which the intro of the song Here Is the News is used as a station call

- Since 1981, the VPRO has used a fragment of the song Here Is the News by Electric Light Orchestra as a station call.
- For a long time, the VPRO concluded their programming with a piece of music by Jakob Klaasse, which was whistled by Jan Tromp.
- Every year, the VPRO broadcasts the television recordings of the Pinkpop Festival in co-production with NTR and BNNVARA.
- Due to its foundation in 1926, the VPRO is the oldest public broadcaster in the Netherlands within the Dutch public broadcasting system.

== See also ==
- Nederlandse Publieke Omroep (NPO)
- Pillarization
- AI Song Contest
