= Netherlands Institute for the Classification of Audiovisual Media =

Dutch classification institute

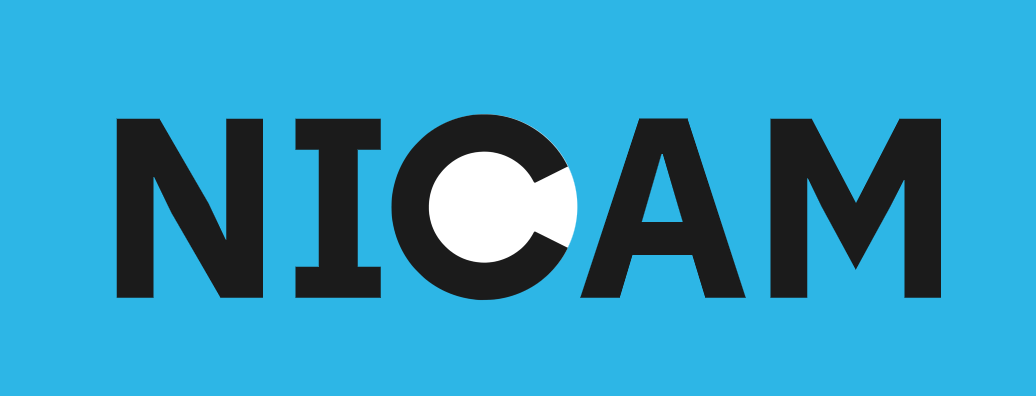
The logo of the Netherlands Institute for the Classification of Audiovisual Media.

Netherlands Institute for the Classification of Audiovisual Media (Nederlands Instituut voor de Classificatie van Audiovisuele Media) is the institute responsible for the content given for review for the Dutch motion picture rating system, Kijkwijzer, and the software given for review for the European video game content rating system PEGI.

== History ==
The first call for regulation within the audiovisual world came from the government at the end of the 1980s, to protect younger audience from possible bad influences. With an explosive growth of audiovisual media, the European Commission called for action, which resulted in the "not for all ages"-governmentnote in 1997. This note pleaded for an independent institute, which would have to serve as a guiding institute for selfregulating within the audiovisual branch.

In 1999 the Nederlands Instituut voor de Classificatie van Audiovisuele Media was founded, in close cooperation with the ministries of Education, Culture & Science (OCW), Public health, Wellbeing and Sport (VWS) and Justice. NICAM began with an initiating and coordinating role in the founding of Kijkwijzer, which was officially accepted by the government in 2000, and became a law on February 22, 2001.

In April 2003, the NICAM was given the task of evaluating computer- and videogame software for the newly founded Pan European Game Information. The British Video Standards Council acts as an agent in the United Kingdom for NICAM due to "high concentration of videogame publishers (that) are found in the UK".

In 2004, the work of the NICAM was evaluated by the Dutch government. Although the evaluation found points that could be improved, it was concluded that the NICAM was functioning well.

== Organisation ==
The independent governing board president of NICAM is Mrs. Hedy d´Ancona.

Over 2,200 companies and organisations are directly or indirectly associated with the NICAM. The governing board consists of representatives of both public and commercial broadcasters, film distributors and cinema operators, distributors, video rental stores and detaillists.

- Dutch Association of Producers and Importers of video- and audio-carriers (NVPI)
- Dutch Video Detaillist Organisation (NVDO)
- Dutch Association of Gramophone record Detaillists (NVGD)
- Dutch Federation for the Cinematography (NFC)
- Dutch Broadcasting Foundation (NOS), representing all Dutch public broadcasters
- Association for Satellite Television and Radio Programme Broadcasters (VESTRA)
