= Hans Verhagen =

Dutch journalist (1939–2020)

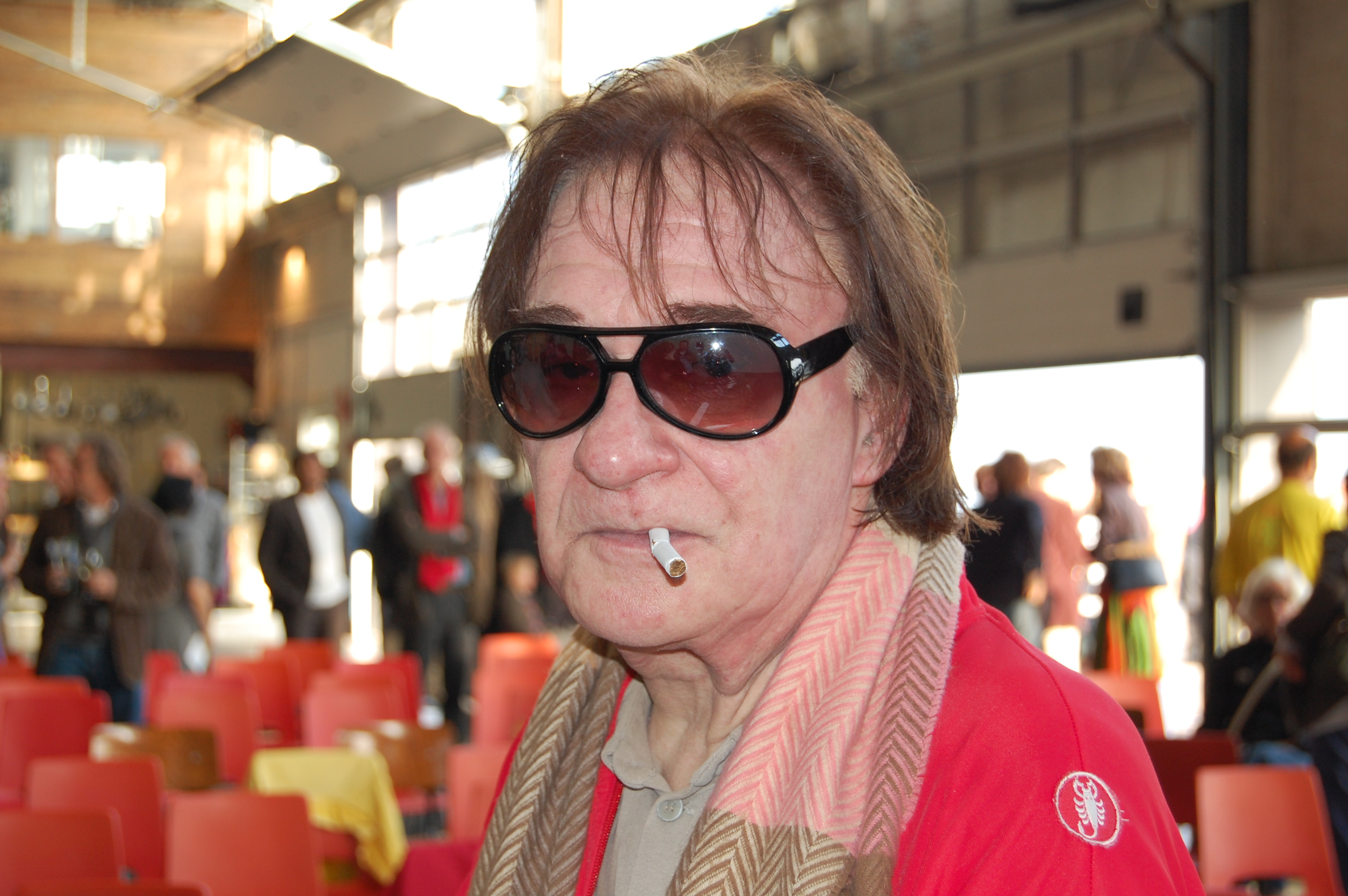
- Verhagen in 2008
- Born: 3 March 1939; Vlissingen, Netherlands
- Died: 10 April 2020 (aged 81); Amsterdam, Netherlands
- Occupations: Journalist, poet, painter, filmmaker
- Writing career
- Language: Dutch
- Notable awards: P. C. Hooft Award (2009)

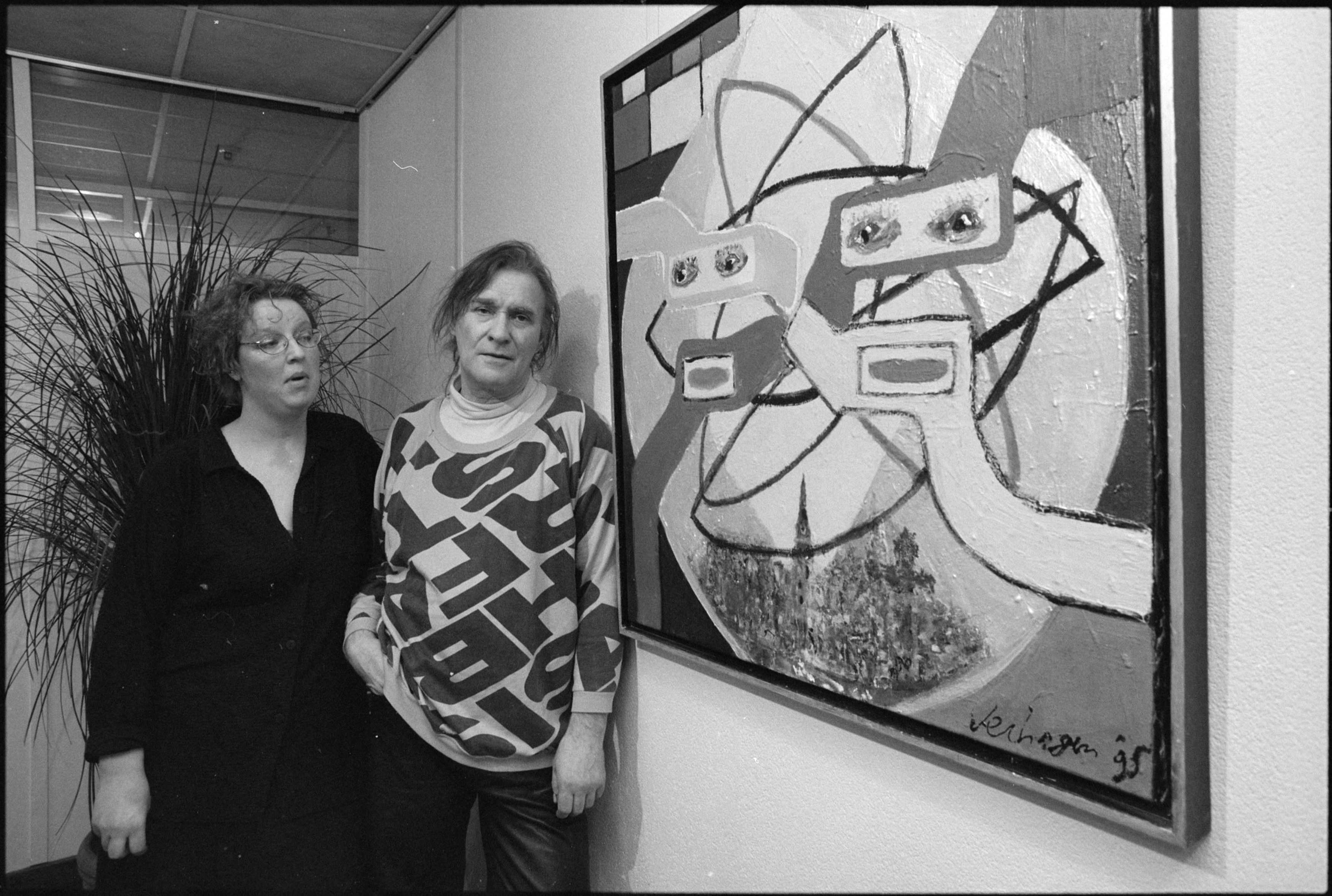
Verhagen with work, 1996.

Hans Verhagen (3 March 1939 – 10 April 2020) was a Dutch journalist, poet, painter and filmmaker, born in Vlissingen. He gained the P. C. Hooft Award in 2009 "for his humour, his engagement, his poetic daring and whimsy."

== Work ==
Verhagen began writing poetry at the start of the 1960s at the same time as he was using drugs. He recalls in an interview that "I learned from those LSD experiences. There is an enormous intensification: everything that has been said and done seems to come together in one place, a kind of diamond.” Applying this experience to poetry he "discovered that you could achieve a maximum power with a minimum of material.” The poems themselves are written in sequences made up of short sections bringing in all kinds of contemporary and scientific material:

Ist deformation: war with myself
(images, limbs, letters)
after only 1 second the air-raid warning escapes

- a language according to my syndrome.

After centuries the 1st poem on the radio.

Tongue in cheek, he later characterised such New Realist writing as "full of misplaced symbolism and defective imagery, quasi-mysticism coupled with an abuse of technical terms."

With the appearance of Duizenden zonsondergangen (Thousands of sunsets, 1971) Verhagen shifted into the sentimental mode of the Dutch renewal of Neo Romanticism. From the eighties onwards he confined himself to painting and did not return to poetry until the new millennium.
