= Phil Bloom =

Dutch artist (born 1945)

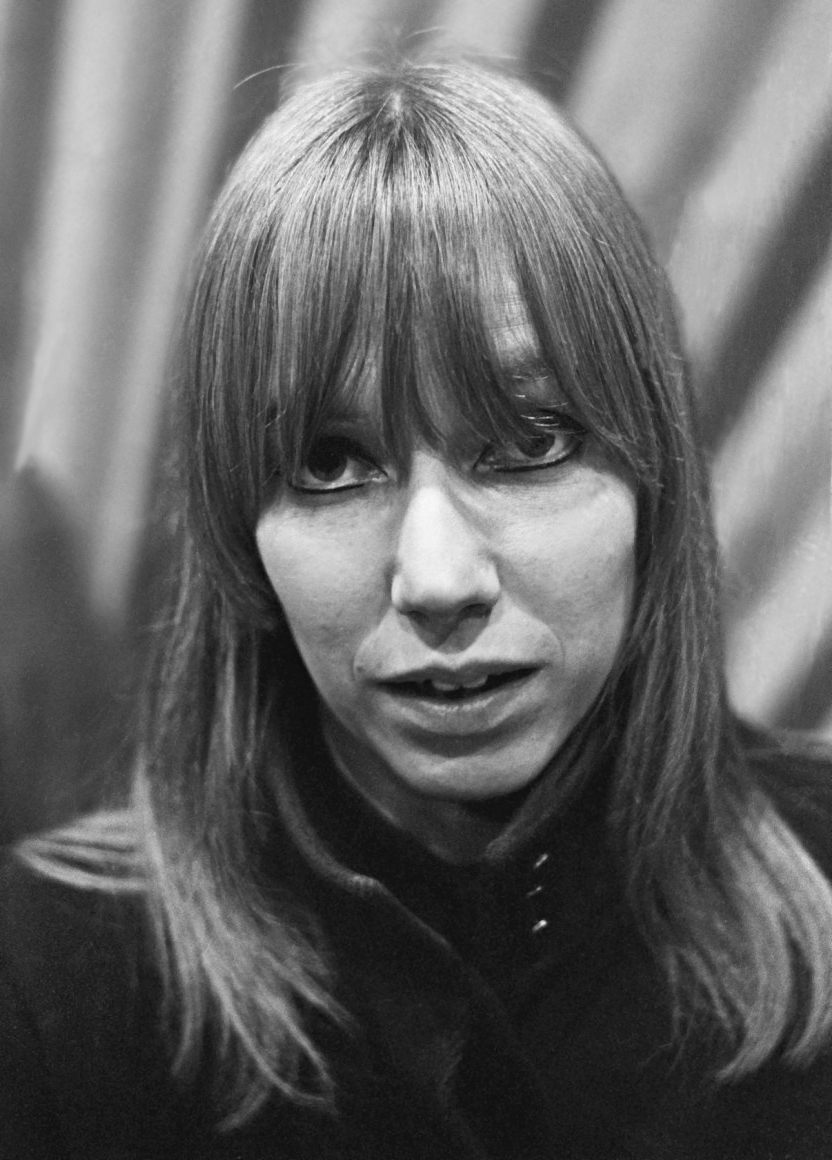
- Bloom in 1968
- Born: 27 November 1945 (age 80); Berkel en Rodenrijs, South Holland, Netherlands
- Occupation: Artist
- Organization: Fluxus (formerly)
- Known for: First person to appear nude on Dutch TV
- Website: www.philbloom.nl

Phil Bloom (born 27 November 1945 in Berkel en Rodenrijs) is a Dutch artist, graphic designer and performer. She was the first person to appear completely nude on Dutch television broadcaster VPRO, on 28 July 1967 during the show Hoepla, which caused scandal and controversy at the time. Afterwards, she worked in painting, photography and performance art. She was a member of the Fluxus network in 1967. A notable performance of hers is "Lemniscaat" which takes place in Lapland.

She still works and lives in Amsterdam.
