= Inspecção Geral das Actividades Culturais =

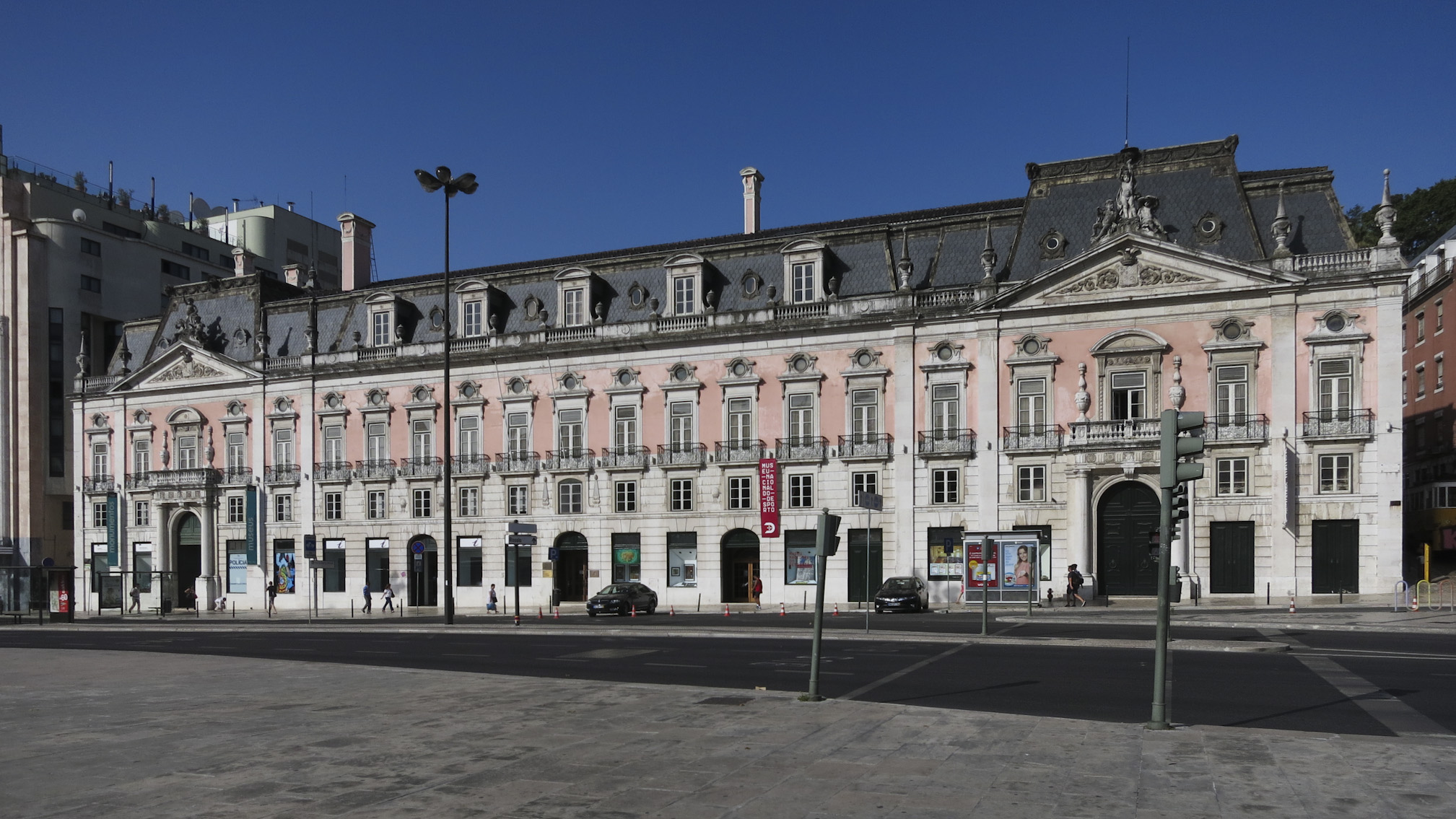
- Headquarters at the Foz Palace in Lisbon

Agency overview
- Jurisdiction: Government of Portugal, Ministry of Culture
- Headquarters: Palácio Foz, Calçada da Glória 9, Lisbon
- Website: www.igac.gov.pt/inicio

Inspecção Geral das Atividades Culturais (IGAC; General Inspection of Cultural Activities), is an organisation that is part of the Ministry of Culture of Portugal. It is the organisation responsible for the rating of video games, films and related media released in Portugal.

== Ratings ==
Films are rated using the following classifications:

- A - (Partly) Suitable for children.
- M/3 Suitable for all ages. Content with this rating should be of short duration and easy to understand. It should not provoke fear and/or collide with the sense of fantasy.
- M/6 Not recommended for children under 6. Content with this rating may be of longer duration and contain some fear factor. Children below the age of 6 must be accompanied by an adult.
- M/12 Not recommended for children under 12. Content with this rating may, due to its length and complexity, provoke fatigue and psychiatric trauma in younger viewers. Children below the age of 12 must be accompanied by an adult.
- M/14 Not recommended for children under 14. Children under 14 must be accompanied by an adult.
- M/16 Not recommended for children under 16. Content with this rating may explore aspects of sexuality, physical and psychic violence. Children under 16 must be accompanied by an adult.
- M/18 Adults only. Content with this rating may be of explicit sexual nature. Children must be accompanied by an adult, and ticket sellers reserve the right to block very young children from these screenings.
