= Weeds (album) =

Studio album by Brewer & Shipley
- Released: 1969
- Studio: Golden State Recorders, San Francisco
- Genre: Folk rock
- Length: 30:56
- Label: Kama Sutra Records
- Producer: Nick Gravenites

Brewer & Shipley chronology
Down In L.A. (1968)	Weeds (1969)	Tarkio (1970)

Professional ratings
Review scores
Source	Rating
AllMusic	4.5/5 stars

Weeds was the second album by Brewer & Shipley and was released in 1969. The album was recorded at Golden State Recorders in San Francisco and produced by Nick Gravenites using the pseudonym "Nicky Gravy". Gravenites assembled a group of highly respected musicians for the album recording sessions, including guitarist Mike Bloomfield, bassist John Kahn, pedal steel guitarist Red Rhodes, violinist Richard Greene and keyboardists Mark Naftalin and Nicky Hopkins.

The final track, "Witchi-Tai-To," in particular, received a lot of FM radio play, contributing to the album's modest success. The duo gained a devoted underground following as a result of this exposure, which also prepared them for the commercial success of their upcoming album release.

Weeds has been reissued on CD twice, both times coupled with Brewer & Shipley's third album Tarkio, firstly by Collector's Choice records in 2004 and then by Acadia Records in 2008.

== Track listing ==
All tracks by Brewer & Shipley except where noted

Side A

1. "Lady Like You" – 2:12
2. "Rise Up (Easy Rider)" – 3:15
3. "Boomerang" – 2:18
4. "Indian Summer" – 2:59
5. "All Along the Watchtower" (Bob Dylan) – 3:18

Side B

1. "People Love Each Other" – 2:55
2. "Pig's Head" – 2:10
3. "Oh, Sweet Lady" – 2:00
4. "Too Soon Tomorrow" – 2:52
5. "Witchi-Tai-To" (Jim Pepper) – 6:57

== Personnel ==
- Mike Brewer – vocals, guitars, shakers, Vibra-slap
- Tom Shipley – vocals, guitars
- Mike Bloomfield – electric guitar
- Fred Olson – electric guitar
- Mark Naftalin – piano, organ
- Ira Kamin – piano, organ
- John Kahn – bass
- Robert Huberman – bass
- Bob Jones – drums
- Orville 'Red' Rhodes – pedal steel guitar
- Richard Greene – fiddle
- AppleJack – harmonica
- Rienol Andino – congas
- Nicky Hopkins – piano

Technical

- Nicky Gravy (Nick Gravenites) - producer
- Leo De Gar Kulka - engineer
- Vance Frost - assistant engineer
