= So Alone =

So Alone may refer to:

== Albums ==
- So Alone (album), by Johnny Thunders, 1978

== Songs ==
- "So Alone" (song), by Men at Large
- "So Alone" by Juliana Hatfield, from the album How to Walk Away
- "So Alone" by Lou Reed, from the album Growing Up in Public
- "So Alone" by The Offspring, from the album Smash
- "So Alone" by Syndicate of Sound, from the album Little Girl
- "So Alone" by Ty Segall, from the album Ty Segall
- "So Alone" a 2010 song by the German emo/rock singer Anna Blue.

== See also ==
- So Lonely (disambiguation)
