= Lawrence Welk =

American bandleader and TV impresario (1903–1992)

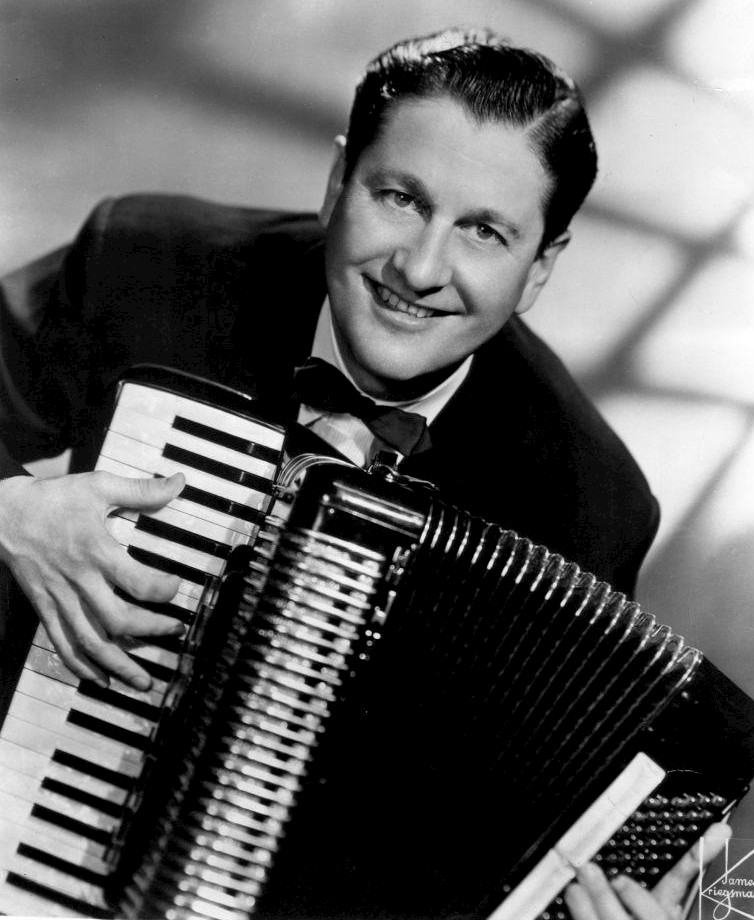
- Welk with his accordion, 1956
- Born: March 11, 1903; Strasburg, North Dakota, U.S.
- Died: May 17, 1992 (aged 89); Santa Monica, California, U.S.
- Resting place: Holy Cross Cemetery, Culver City, California
- Education: MacPhail Center for Music
- Occupations: Accordionist; bandleader; television impresario
- Years active: 1924–1982
- Television: The Lawrence Welk Show
- Spouse: Fern Veronica Renner (m. 1931)
- Children: 3

Lawrence Welk (March 11, 1903 – May 17, 1992) was an American accordionist, bandleader, and television impresario, who hosted The Lawrence Welk Show from 1951 to 1982. The program was known for its light and family-friendly style, and the easy listening music featured became known as "champagne music" to his radio, television, and live-performance audiences.

Welk, a native of North Dakota who was born to German immigrants from Russia, began his career as a bandleader in the 1920s in the Great Plains. He gradually became more known throughout the country due to recordings and radio performances, and he and his orchestra were based in Chicago in the 1940s, where they had a standing residency at the Trianon Ballroom. By the start of the next decade, Welk relocated to Los Angeles and began hosting his eponymous television show, first on local television, before going national when the show was picked up by ABC in 1955. The show's popularity held through the following years, and with its focus on inoffensive entertainment, it was embraced by conservative audiences as an antidote to the counterculture of the 1960s. Welk vigorously sought to uphold this "clean-cut" reputation, and was deeply involved in managing both the on- and off-camera reputations of his show's performers.

In 1971, ABC cancelled The Lawrence Welk Show as part of a broader trend away from programs aimed at older or more rural audiences. Welk then continued his program in broadcast syndication until retiring in 1982. In the remaining decade of his life, he managed various business interests and packaged reruns of his show for broadcast on PBS, where it has continued to appear into the 21st century.

== Early life ==
Welk was born in the German-speaking community of Strasburg, North Dakota. He was sixth of the eight children of Ludwig and Christiana (née Schwahn) Welk, Roman Catholic ethnic Germans who had emigrated in 1892 from Odessa in the Russian Empire (later Ukraine).

Welk was a first cousin, once removed, of former Montana governor Brian Schweitzer (Welk's mother and Schweitzer's paternal grandmother were siblings). Welk's paternal great-great-grandparents, Moritz and Magdalena Welk, emigrated in 1808 from Germanophone Alsace-Lorraine to Ukraine.

The family lived on a homestead that became a tourist attraction. They spent the cold North Dakota winter of their first year inside an upturned wagon covered in sod. Welk left school during fourth grade to work full-time on the family farm.

Welk decided on a career in music and persuaded his father to buy a mail-order accordion for $400 (equivalent to $6,429 in 2025). He promised his father that he would work on the farm until he was 21, in repayment for the accordion. Any money he made elsewhere during that time, doing farmwork or performing, would go to his family.

Welk became an iconic figure in the German-Russian community of the northern Great Plains—his success story personified the American dream. Welk did not learn to speak English until he was 21; he never felt comfortable speaking in public. To the day he died, his English had a marked German accent.

== Early career ==
On his 21st birthday, having fulfilled his promise to his father, Welk left the family farm to pursue a career in music. During the 1920s, he performed with various bands before forming an orchestra. He led dance bands in North Dakota and eastern South Dakota, including the Hotsy Totsy Boys and the Honolulu Fruit Gum Orchestra. His band was also the station band for the popular radio programming WNAX in Yankton, South Dakota. The Lawrence Welk Orchestra scored an immediate success and began a daily radio show, which lasted from 1927 to 1936. The radio show led to many well-paying engagements for the band throughout the midwestern states. In 1927, he graduated from the MacPhail School of Music in Minneapolis, Minnesota.

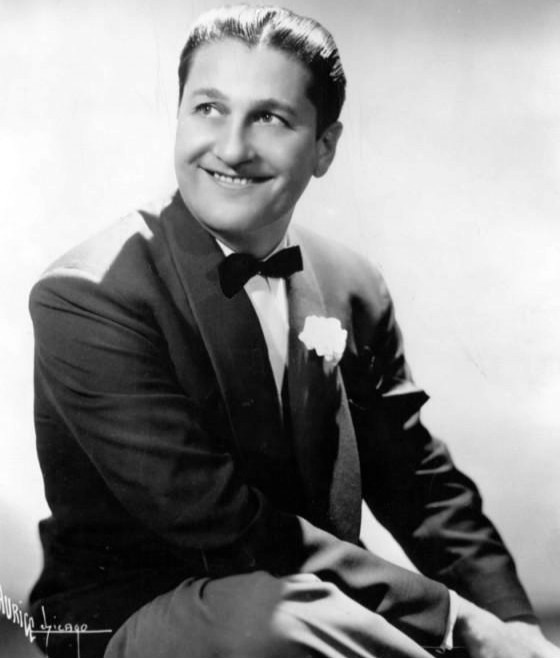
Welk in Chicago, 1944

Although many associate Welk's music with a style quite separate from jazz, he recorded several jazzy sides; in November 1928 for Gennett Records, based in Richmond, Indiana: "Spiked Beer" and "Doin' The New Low Down" and in 1931 in Grafton, Wisconsin for Paramount Records "Smile Darn Ya, Smile".

During the 1930s, Welk led a touring dance band specializing in dance tunes and "sweet" music (during this period, bands performing light-melodic music were referred to as "sweet bands" to distinguish them from the more rhythmic and assertive "hot" bands of artists like Benny Goodman and Duke Ellington). Initially, the band traveled around the country by car. They were too poor to rent rooms, so they usually slept and changed clothes in their cars. The term champagne music was derived from an engagement at the William Penn Hotel in Pittsburgh, after a dancer referred to his band's sound as "light and bubbly as champagne." The hotel also lays claim to the original "bubble machine," a prop left over from a 1920s movie premiere. Welk described his band's sound, saying, "We still play music with the champagne style, which means light and rhythmic. We place the stress on melody; the chords are played pretty much the way the composer wrote them. We play with a steady beat so dancers can follow it."

Welk's band performed across the country, but particularly in the Chicago and Milwaukee areas. In the early 1940s, the band began a 10-year stint at the Trianon Ballroom in Chicago, regularly drawing crowds of several thousand. His orchestra also performed frequently at the Roosevelt Hotel in New York City during the late 1940s. In 1944 and 1945, Welk led his orchestra in 10 "Soundies", three-minute movie musicals considered to be the early pioneers of music videos.

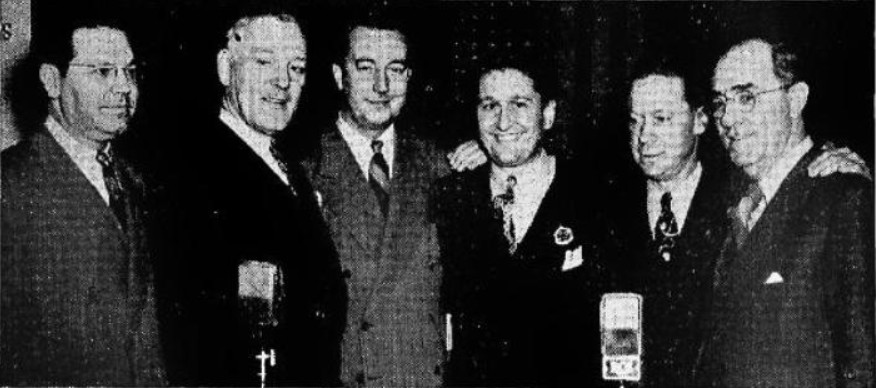
Lawrence Welk with War Bond officials during a c. 1943 event in Chicago.

Welk collaborated with Western artist Red Foley to record a version of Spade Cooley's "Shame on You" in 1945. The record (Decca 18698) was number 4 to Cooley's number 5 on Billboard's September 15 "Most Played Juke Box Folk Records" listing. From 1949 through 1951, the band had radio programming on ABC, sponsored by Miller High Life, "The Champagne of Bottled Beer."

In addition to his activities as a performing artist, Welk edited a course of modern music for the piano accordion which included arrangements by John Serry for the U. S. School of Music in New York City in 1953.

== Recordings ==
In addition to the above-mentioned "Spiked Beer," Welk's territory band made occasional trips to Richmond, Indiana, and to Grafton, Wisconsin, to record a handful of sessions for the Gennett and Paramount companies. In November 1928 he recorded four sides for Gennett spread over two days (one side was rejected), and in 1931 he recorded eight sides for Paramount (in two sessions) that were issued on the Broadway and Lyric labels. These records are rare and highly valued.

From 1938 to 1940, he recorded frequently in New York and Chicago for Vocalion Records. During this period Welk recorded numerous instrumentals especially for radio stations; these transcription records became a broadcasting staple. Welk signed with Decca Records in 1941, then recorded for Mercury Records and Coral Records for short periods of time before moving to Dot Records in 1959.

In 1967, Welk left Dot Records and joined its former executive Randy Wood in creating Ranwood Records. Welk bought back all his masters from Dot and Coral, and Ranwood became the outlet for all of Welk's many artists. They started with a huge reissue of old Dot albums in 1968 to get them started on the right foot. Wood's interest was sold to Welk in 1979. In 2015, Welk Music Group sold the Vanguard and Sugar Hill labels to Concord Bicycle Music while retaining ownership of the Ranwood catalog. Welk's estate licensed the Ranwood catalogue to Concord Music Group for 10 years.

== The Lawrence Welk Show ==
In 1951, Welk settled in Los Angeles. The same year, he began producing The Lawrence Welk Show on KTLA in Los Angeles, where it was broadcast from the Aragon Ballroom in Venice Beach. The show became a local hit and was picked up by ABC in June 1955. By 1956, Welk also signed with Ben Selvin at RCA Thesaurus for broadcasts of his "New Lawrence Welk Show" on leading national radio networks.

During its first year on the air, the Welk hour instituted several regular features. To make Welk's "Champagne Music" tagline visual, the production crew engineered a "bubble machine" that spouted streams of large bubbles across the bandstand. While the bubble machine was originally engineered to produce soap bubbles, complaints from the band members about soapy build-ups on their instruments led to the machine being reworked to produce glycerine bubbles instead. During the show's first year, the bubble machine operated continuously, with the bubbles wafting across the musicians' faces and instruments for the entire hour. Within a year, the bubble machine was retired except for the opening and closing "Champagne Music" selections. Whenever the orchestra played a polka or waltz, Welk himself would dance with the band's female vocalist, the "Champagne Lady". This was a long-standing tradition in the Welk band; the first Champagne Lady was Lois Best (1939 to 1941), followed during the war years by Jayne Walton.

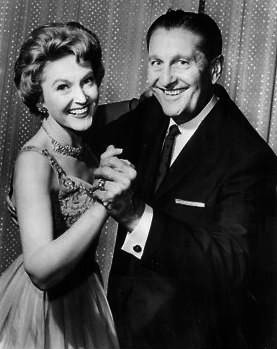
Welk with Norma Zimmer in 1961.

Beginning with the Welk show's freshman year, Welk was careful to program current songs in addition to the traditional big-band standards. The Boyd Bennett rock-and-roll hit "My Boy Flat Top" was featured on two different programs (November 26, 1955, and December 10, 1955, the latter featuring Buddy Merrill on electric guitar). The policy was relaxed over the next year, with new songs still being included but now being treated as novelty arrangements. In the December 8, 1956, broadcast, "Nuttin' for Christmas" became a vehicle for Rocky Rockwell dressed in a child's outfit, and Elvis Presley's "Don't Be Cruel" was sung by the violinist Bob Lido, wearing fake Presley-style sideburns. In another episode, the Lennon Sisters and Norma Zimmer performed the Orlons' No. 2 pop hit "The Wah-Watusi" with the bass singer Larry Hooper wearing a beatnik outfit.

These stood in comparison to the contemporary American Bandstand, which catered to a teenager audience and featured the latest acts. In a 1971 episode, Welk infamously billed the Brewer & Shipley single "One Toke Over the Line" (performed as a duet by Gail Farrell and Dick Dale), which referenced the use of marijuana, as a "modern spiritual"; social conservatives of the era saw the song as subversive and it became the first casualty of an attempt by the Federal Communications Commission to get radio stations to ban all pro-drug songs. Later in the 1970s, however, Welk's programs often included current adult contemporary songs performed by his singers, including "Feelings" and "Love Will Keep Us Together" (made famous by Morris Albert and Captain & Tennille, respectively), and current songs were included up through 1982, the final year of production of the show.

Whenever a Dixieland tune was scheduled, Welk harked back to his days with the Hotsy Totsy Boys and enthusiastically led the band. Befitting the target audience, the type of music on The Lawrence Welk Show was conservative, concentrating on popular music standards, show tunes, polkas, and novelty songs, delivered in a smooth, calm, good-humored easy-listening style and "family-oriented" manner. Although described by one critic, Canadian journalist and entertainment editor Frank Rasky, as "the squarest music this side of Euclid", this strategy proved commercially successful, and the show remained on the air for 31 years.

Welk's musicians included accordionist Myron Floren, the concert violinist Dick Kesner, the guitarist Buddy Merrill, and the New Orleans Dixieland clarinetist Pete Fountain. Though Welk was occasionally rumored to be tight with a dollar, he paid his regular band members top scale. Long tenure was common among the regulars. For example, Floren was the band's assistant conductor throughout the show's run. He was noted for spotlighting individual members of his band.

Welk had a number of instrumental hits, including a cover of the song "Yellow Bird". His highest-charting record was "Calcutta", written by Heino Gaze, which achieved hit status in 1961. Welk himself was indifferent to the tune, but his musical director, George Cates, said that if Welk did not wish to record the song, he (Cates) would. Welk replied, "Well, if it's good enough for you, George, I guess it's good enough for me." Although the rock-and-roll explosion in the mid-1950s had driven most older artists off the charts, "Calcutta" reached number 1 on the U.S. pop charts between February 13 and 26, 1961; it was recorded in only one take. The tune knocked The Shirelles' "Will You Love Me Tomorrow" out of the number 1 position, and it kept the Miracles' "Shop Around" from becoming the group's first number-1 hit, holding their recording at number 2. It sold more than one million copies and was awarded a gold disc.

The album Calcutta! also achieved number-one status. The albums Last Date, Yellow Bird, Moon River, Young World and Baby Elephant Walk and Theme from the Brothers Grimm, produced in the early 60s, were in Billboard's top ten; nine more albums produced between 1956 and 1963 were in the top twenty. His albums continued to chart through 1973.

Welk was adamant on providing wholesome entertainment. For example, he fired Alice Lon, at the time the show's "Champagne Lady," because he believed she was showing too much leg. Welk told the audience that he would not tolerate such "cheesecake" performances on his show. A torrent of fan mail indicated that viewers opposed Lon's firing. Welk relented and offered Lon her job back, but Lon refused. He then had a series of short-term "Champagne Ladies" before Norma Zimmer became Lon's permanent replacement. He was highly involved with his stars' personal lives, often to the point of arbitrating their marital disputes. His musical conservatism caused occasional controversies as well. Despite the authentic New Orleans Dixieland clarinet that made him a popular cast member, Pete Fountain left the orchestra in a dispute with Welk over adding a jazz solo to a Christmas song.

Reflecting the controversies about the quality of Welk's music among the cognoscenti, in 1956, musical satirist Stan Freberg, known for his love of jazz, wrote and recorded a biting Welk satire, "Wunnerful! Wunnerful!" Freberg impersonated Welk. Recorded with some of Hollywood's best jazz musicians, arranged by Billy May to sound like authentic Welk, the single mocked Welk's accordion work, his sometimes-stumbling patter between songs and the music of such Welk favorites Rocky Rockwell ("Stony Stonedwell"), Champagne Lady Alice Lon ("Alice Lean") and Larry Hooper ("Larry Looper"). Welk was not amused, and when he met Freberg years later, claimed he never used the "Wunnerful! Wunnerful!" term. Ironically, it became the title of Welk's 1971 autobiography.

Despite its staid reputation, The Lawrence Welk Show nonetheless kept up with the times and never limited itself strictly to music of the big-band era. During the 1960s and 1970s, for instance, the show incorporated material by such contemporary sources as the Beatles, Burt Bacharach and Hal David, Neil Sedaka, the Everly Brothers and Paul Williams (as well as, in the most notorious example, Brewer & Shipley), all arranged in a format that was easily digestible to older viewers. Originally produced in black and white, in 1957 the show began being recorded on videotape, and it switched to color for the fall 1965 season.

During its network run, The Lawrence Welk Show aired on ABC on Saturday nights at 9 p.m. (Eastern Time), moving up a half-hour to 8:30 p.m. in the fall of 1963. In fact, Welk headlined two weekly prime-time shows on ABC for three years. From 1956 to 1958, he hosted Top Tunes and New Talent, which aired on Monday nights. The series moved to Wednesdays in the fall of 1958 and was renamed The Plymouth Show, which ended in May 1959. During that time, the Saturday show was also known as The Dodge Dancing Party. During this period, the networks were in the process of eliminating programming that was seen as having either too old an audience, did not appeal to urban residents, or both (the so-called Rural purge). As The Lawrence Welk Show fit into this category, ABC ended its run in 1971. Welk thanked ABC and the sponsors at the end of the last network show. The Lawrence Welk Show continued on as a first-run syndicated program shown on 250 stations across the country until the final original show was produced in 1982, when Welk decided to retire. While many longtime TV shows suffered a serious ratings drop during the counterculture movement of the late 1960s, The Lawrence Welk Show survived largely intact and even had increased viewership during this time, albeit consisting of mostly older viewers.

For the entire run, musical numbers were divided fairly evenly between prerecorded lip- and finger-sync performances and those recorded live on film or tape. Generally, the big production numbers featuring dancing and singing performances were recorded earlier in the day or the day before, often at famous recording studios in and around nearby Hollywood, while the more intimate numbers were recorded live on tape or film.

After retiring from his show and the road in 1982, Welk continued to air reruns of his shows, which were repackaged first for syndication and, starting in 1986, for public television. He also starred in and produced a pair of Christmas specials in 1984 and 1985.

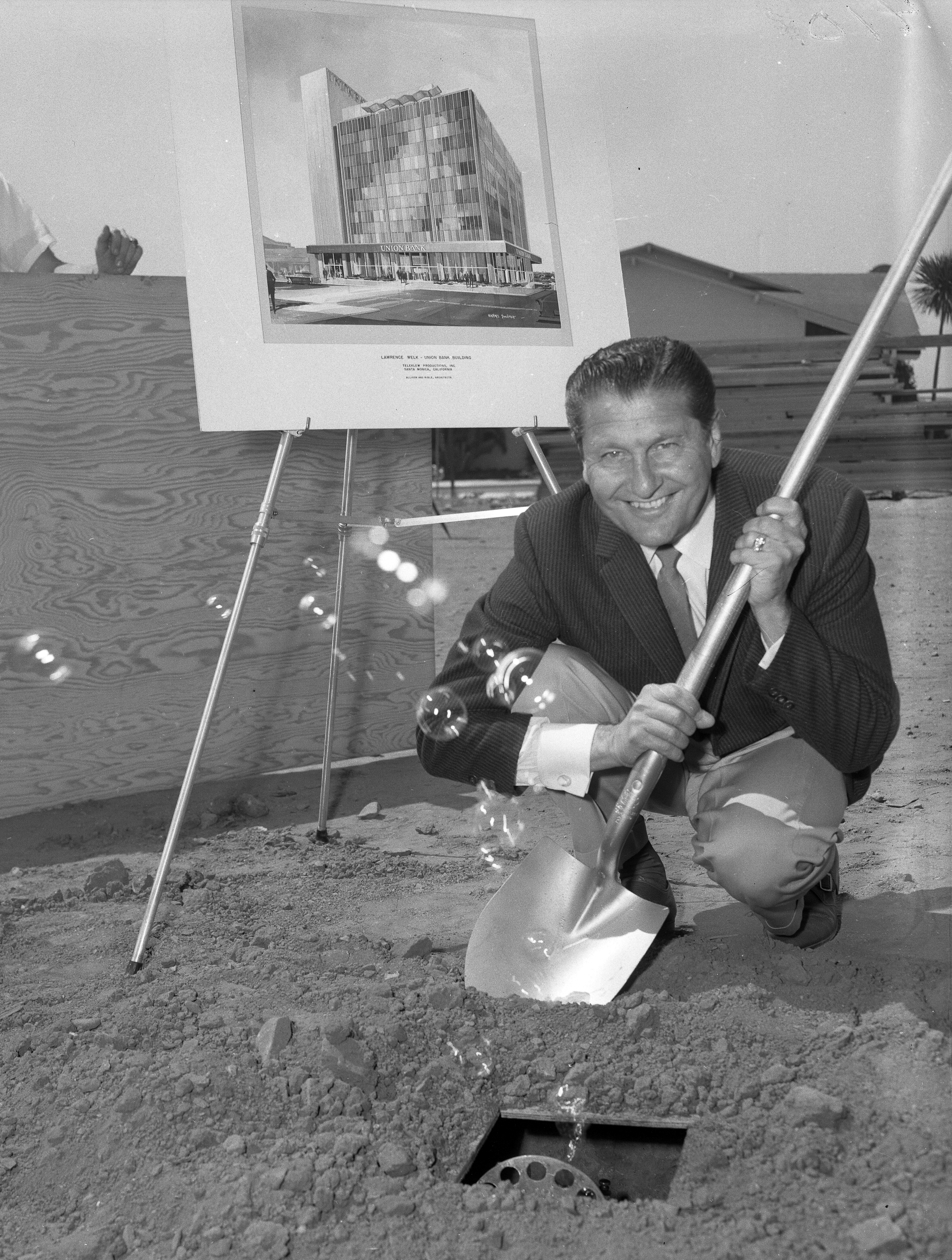
Welk at the groundbreaking of the new Union Bank in Santa Monica, California, 1960

== Business ventures ==
Welk was a businessman and subsequent to his marriage in 1930, he was the manager of a hotel, restaurant, and music store.

In the late 1950s, he founded Teleklew Inc., which had investments in music publishing, recordings, and real estate.

In the 1970s, he developed the "Lawrence Welk Plaza", now known as the 100 Wilshire Blvd Building, in Santa Monica, California, the 21-story high rise which was the former GTE building. Next to that building is the "Lawrence Welk Champagne Towers" the 16-story luxury Apartment Complex, along with the 11-story Wilshire Palisades office building.

In the 1980s, the company became The Welk Group and subsequently split into Welk Music Group and Welk Resort Group.

Welk was awarded four U.S. design patents for a musically themed restaurant menu, an accordion-themed tray for serving food at a restaurant, and an accordion-themed ashtray.

== Personal life and death ==
Welk was married for 61 years, until his death in 1992, to Fern Renner (August 26, 1903 – February 13, 2002), with whom he had two daughters and a son. His son, Lawrence Welk Jr., married and divorced fellow Lawrence Welk Show performer Tanya Falan. Welk had 10 grandchildren and a great-grandchild. His grandson Lawrence Welk III is a helicopter pilot who worked with Zoey Tur and owns Angel City Air, which provides aerial electronic newsgathering services to television stations in Los Angeles.

A devout Roman Catholic, Welk was a daily communicant. He was a member of The Benevolent and Protective Order of Elks.

He died of pneumonia on May 17, 1992, at age 89, at his Santa Monica home, surrounded by his family. He is buried in Holy Cross Cemetery in Culver City, California.

== Honors ==
In 1961, Welk was inducted as a charter member of the Rough Rider Award from his native North Dakota. In 1967, he received the Horatio Alger Award from the Horatio Alger Association of Distinguished Americans. He later served as the grand marshal for the Rose Bowl's Tournament of Roses parade in 1972. Welk received the Golden Plate Award of the American Academy of Achievement in 1980.

In 1994, Welk was inducted into the International Polka Music Hall of Fame.

Welk has a star for recording on the Hollywood Walk of Fame, located at 6613½ Hollywood Boulevard. He has a second star at 1601 Vine Street for television.

In 2007, Welk became a charter member of the Gennett Records Walk of Fame in Richmond, Indiana.

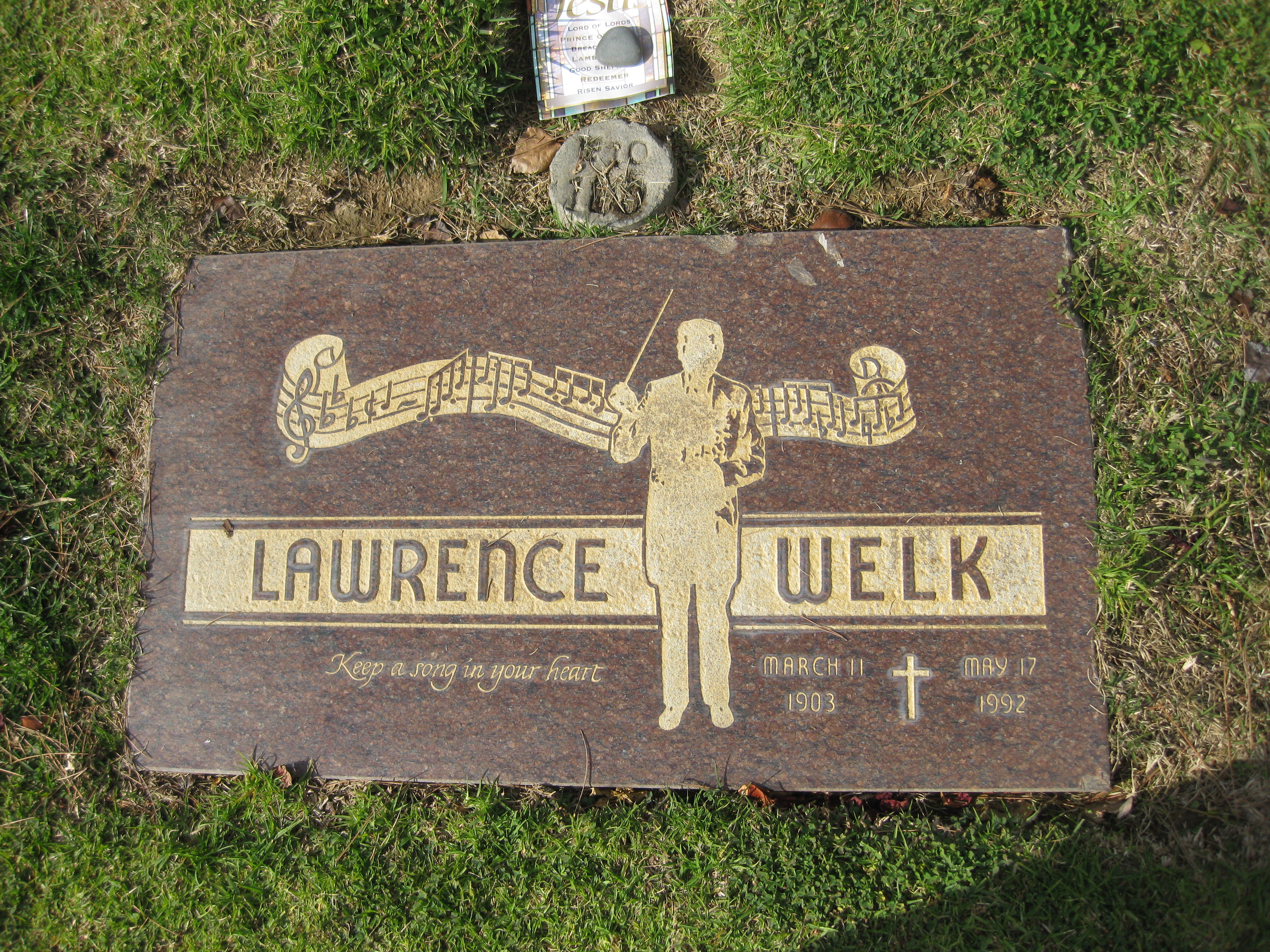
Welk's grave at Holy Cross Cemetery, Culver City, California

== Legacy ==
Welk's band continues to appear in a dedicated theater in Branson, Missouri. In addition, the television show has been repackaged for broadcast on PBS stations, with updates from show performers appearing as wraparounds where the original shows had commercial breaks. The repackaged shows are broadcast at roughly the same Saturday night time slot as the original ABC shows, and special longer rebroadcasts are often shown during individual stations' fund-raising periods. These repackaged shows are produced by the Oklahoma Educational Television Authority.

The "Live Lawrence Welk Show" makes annual concert tours across the United States and Canada, featuring stars from the television series, including Ralna English, Mary Lou Metzger, Gail Farrell, and Anacani.

== Books by Welk ==
All of Welk's books are coauthored by, or written in conjunction with, Bernice McGeehan and published by Prentice Hall, except where indicated:

- Wunnerful, Wunnerful: The Autobiography of Lawrence Welk, 1971, ISBN 0-13-971515-0
- Ah-One, Ah-Two! Life with My Musical Family, 1974, ISBN 0-13-020990-2
- My America, Your America, 1976, ISBN 0-13-608414-1
- Lawrence Welk's Musical Family Album, 1977, ISBN 0-13-526624-6
- Lawrence Welk's Bunny Rabbit Concert, illustrated by Carol Bryan, Indianapolis: Youth Publications/Saturday Evening Post Co., 1977, ISBN 0-89387-501-5 (children's book)
- You're Never Too Young, 1981, ISBN 0-13-977181-6
- Champagne Times: Lawrence Welk and His American Century, by Lance Byron Richey, 31 May 2025, ISBN 978-1-946163-76-9 Fargo: North Dakota State University Press. Three-volume limited edition, signed, numbered.

== Singles ==
Year	Single	Chart positions		
Year	Single	US	CB	US – AC
1938	"Colorado Sunset" b/w "There's A Faraway Look In Your Eyes"	17	–	–
1938	"Change Partners" b/w "I Used to Be Color Blind"	13	–	–
1938	"I Won't Tell A Soul" /	8	–	–
1938	"Two Sleepy People"	13	–	–
1939	"Annabelle" b/w "Then I Wrote A Song About You"	10	–	–
1939	"The Moon Is A Silver Dollar" b/w "I'm A Lucky Devil"	7	–	–
1939	"Bubbles In The Wine" b/w "On Sweetheart Bay"	13	–	–
1939	"I'm Happy About The Whole Thing" b/w "In A Moment Of Weakness"	18	–	–
1941	"Daddy's Lullaby" /	21	–	–
1941	"Maria Elena"	22	–	–
1941	"Little Sleepy Head" b/w "Sweet and Low"	21	–	–
1942	"Dear Home In Holland"	21	–	–
1944	"Cleanin' My Rifle (And Dreamin' Of You)" /	23	–	–
1944	"I Wish That I Could Hide Inside This Letter"	20	–	–
1944	"Don't Sweetheart Me" /	2	–	–
1944	"Mairzy Doats"	16	–	–
1944	"Is My Baby Blue Tonight?" b/w "One Little Lie Too Many"	13	–	–
1945	"Shame On You"* b/w "At Mail Call Today"; Both sides with Red Foley	13	–	–
1953	"Oh Happy Day" b/w "Your Mother and Mine"	5	3	–
1955	"Bonnie Blue Gal" b/w "Sam, The Old Accordion Man"	–	27	–
1956	"Moritat" (Theme From "The Threepenny Opera") b/w "Stompin' at the Savoy"	17	–	–
1956	"The Poor People of Paris" b/w "Nobody Knows But The Lord"	17	–	–
1956	"On the Street Where You Live" b/w "I Could Have Danced All Night"	96	–	–
1956	"Weary Blues" (with The McGuire Sisters) /	32	42	–
1956	"In the Alps" (with The McGuire Sisters)	63	–	–
1956	"Tonight You Belong to Me" (with The Lennon Sisters) /	15	3	–
1956	"When the Lilacs Bloom Again"	70	18	–
1957	"Cinco Robles" b/w "Whispering Heart"	–	29	–
1957	"Liechtensteiner Polka" b/w "You Know Too Much"	48	–	–
1960	"Last Date" b/w "Remember Lolita"	21	103	–
1960	"Calcutta" b/w "My Grandfather's Clock"	1	1	–
1961	"Theme From 'My Three Sons'" /	55	28	–
1961	"Out Of A Clear Blue Sky"	–	128	–
1961	"Yellow Bird" b/w "Cruising Down the River"	71	–	–
1961	"Riders In The Sky" /	87	69	–
1961	"My Love For You"	–	141	–
1961	"A-One A-Two A-Cha Cha Cha" b/w "You Gave Me Wings"	117	94	–
1962	"Runaway" b/w "Happy Love"	56	87	–
1962	"Baby Elephant Walk" /	48	84	10
1962	"Theme From 'The Brothers Grimm'"	–	130	–
1962	"Zero-Zero" b/w "Night Theme"	98	79	–
1963	"Scarlett O'Hara" /	89	100	–
1963	"Breakwater"	100	101	–
1963	"Blue Velvet" /	103	–	–
1963	"Fiesta"	106	111	–
1964	"Stockholm" b/w "The Girl From Barbados"	91	115	–
1965	"Apples and Bananas" b/w "Theme From 'The Addams Family'"	75	88	17
1967	"The Beat Goes On" b/w "Then You Can Tell Me Goodbye"	104	94	–
1968	"Green Tambourine" b/w "Watch What Happens"	–	–	27
1970	"Southtown, U.S.A." b/w "Hello, Dolly!"	–	–	37

* "Shame On You" also made the US Country charts (No. 1) as well as its flip side, "At Mail Call Today" (No. 3)
** "Calcutta" also made the US R&B chart, reaching No. 10

== See also ==
- The Lennon Sisters – mainstay singers for Welk from 1955 to 1968
- Aragon Ballroom (Ocean Park)
