= Little Girl (Syndicate of Sound album) =

Studio album by Syndicate of Sound
- Released: July 1966
- Studio: Golden State, San Francisco
- Genre: Garage rock, pop
- Length: 30:07
- Label: Bell Records
- Producer: Garrie Thompson

Singles from Little Girl
- 1. "Little Girl" Released: April 1966; 2. "Rumors" Released: July 1966

Professional ratings
Review scores
Source	Rating
Allmusic	3/5 stars

Little Girl is the debut album by the American garage rock band Syndicate of Sound. It was released in July 1966 by Bell Records. It blended both garage and psychedelic rock influences. The album was preceded by the single, "Little Girl".

== Background ==
After their single "Little Girl" rose up the charts to the number 8 position in summer of 1966, the Syndicate of Sound entered the studio to record an album. By the time of the album recording, Larry Ray had been replaced on lead guitar by Jim Sawyers. Half of the songs were penned by the group themselves, the remaining were covers from artists as diverse as The Hollies, The Sonics, Chuck Berry and Roy Orbison. John Sharkey has stated that each of the band members picked a song to cover and then they added "Big Boss Man", which was a regular part of their set-list. The album session also produced their follow-up single "Rumors", which peaked at number 55 on the Billboard Hot 100 charts on October 1, 1966.

== Track listing ==
Side one

1. "Big Boss Man" (Luther Dixon, Al Smith) – 2:55
2. "Almost Grown" (Chuck Berry) – 2:13
3. "So Alone" (John Sharkey) – 3:05
4. "Dream Baby" (Cindy Walker) – 2:34
5. "Rumors" (Sharkey) – 2:06
6. "Little Girl" (Don Baskin, Bob Gonzalez) – 2:25

Side two

1. "That Kind of Man" (Baskin) – 2:18
2. "I'm Alive" (Clint Ballard, Jr.) – 2:21
3. "You" (Sharkey) – 2:42
4. "Lookin' for the Good Times (The Robot)" (Sharkey) – 2:26
5. "The Witch" (Gerald Roslie) – 2:33
6. "Is You Is Or Is You Ain't My Baby" (Bill Austin, Louis Jordan) – 2:29

=== Bonus tracks on 1997 release ===
13. "The Upper Hand" (Baskin, Gonzalez) – 2:14
14. "Mary" (Baskin) – 2:32
15. "Keep It Up" (Baskin) – 2:44
16. "Good Time Music" (Baskin) – 2:12

== Personnel ==
=== Musicians ===
- Don Baskin – vocals, guitar
- Jim Sawyers – lead guitar (tracks 1–5, 7–8, 10–12)
- Bob Gonzalez – bass guitar
- John Sharkey – keyboards
- John Duckworth – drums
- Larry Ray – lead guitar (tracks 6,9)

=== Technical ===
- Garrie Thompson – producer
- Leo De Gar Kulka – engineer
- Chuck Patti – liner notes

== Charts ==
Album – Billboard (United States)

Year	Chart	Position
1966	Billboard 200	148

=== Singles ===
Year	Single	Billboard Hot 100
1966	"Little Girl"	8
1966	"Rumors"	55

== Sources ==
- Savage, Jon (2015). 1966: The Year the Decade Exploded. London: Faber & Faber. ISBN 978-0-571-27762-9 – via the Internet Archive.
