= The Love Exchange =

- Origin: Los Angeles, California, United States
- Genres: Psychedelic rock, garage rock
- Years active: 1967–1969
- Labels: Uptown Records; Tower Records
- Past members: Danny Altchuler; Fred Barnett; Jeff Barnett; Walt Flannery; Mike Joyce; Lana Hale; Bonnie Blunt

The Love Exchange was an American psychedelic rock band, best known for their single "Swallow the Sun", released in 1967. Sixteen-year-old Bonnie Blunt was the band's lead singer. They were signed by Uptown Records, a subsidiary of MCA Records.

== "Swallow the Sun" (1967) ==
By late November 1967, The Love Exchange released a single, "Swallow the Sun" b/w "Meadow Memory" (Uptown Records 755). Written by John Merrill, "Swallow the Sun" is described as the band's "chief claim to fame" and "a nice folk-rock-psychedelic tune that's emblematic of the time with its trippily optimistic lyrics, garage-like Mamas & the Papas female-male harmonies, and swirling organ". "Swallow the Sun" was "a re-titled cover of 'Dark on You Now' (with some different lyrics) by the Peanut Butter Conspiracy", which had previously been recorded by Merrill's previous band, The Ashes. The song was anthologized on the Los Angeles portion of the Highs in the Mid-Sixties series, and also on the folk-rock volume of the Nuggets series on Rhino in the 1980s.

== Love Exchange (1968) ==
The Love Exchange's eponymous 1968 album Love Exchange was recorded in one day at Leo de Gar Kulka's Golden State Recorders Studios at Harrison Street, San Francisco, produced by Larry Goldberg of Number One Productions, who "put his name on our songs", and was credited with writing most of the songs, with the exception of "the appropriately melancholy and ghostly 'Ballad of a Sad Man' (written by bassist Mike Joyce)".

There is some conjecture that Goldberg took two of the LP's backing tracks and used them on a single by The Floor Traders (MTA Records 136). The A-side of this single was "Live a Little," a cover of a song from the Broadway musical How Now, Dow Jones. The B-side is "Don't Call Me No More." Both songs sound very much like a Golden Recorders session where the Love Exchange album was recorded, but there is no definitive indication on the session tapes. Previous citation of two tracks, including "Live a Little," being used on the actual original cast recording of the musical on RCA Records is erroneous.

In April 1968, Love Exchange was released and received a favorable rating by Billboard. However, music critic Richie Unterberger was less charitable in his assessment of the album: "In addition to featuring "Swallow the Sun," [it] had an assortment of minor-league psych-folk-pop crossover efforts, few of them written by the band. ... These were pretty shallow garage-psych-folk-rock efforts with their utopian rose-colored lyrics and organ-modal-guitar combinations, like a minor-league Peanut Butter Conspiracy (who weren't such major talents themselves)."

The Love Exchange played often in Los Angeles, including gigs at Pandora's Box and other Sunset Strip clubs, the Los Angeles Sports Arena, and at some festivals, but broke up after appearing at the Newport '69 Pop Festival in June 1969.
