= Birth of the Dead =

Compilation album by Grateful Dead
- Released: March 25, 2003
- Recorded: November 3, 1965 – April 1967
- Genre: Jam, folk rock, psychedelic rock
- Length: 126:57
- Label: Rhino Records

Grateful Dead chronology
Dick's Picks Volume 27 (2003)	Birth of the Dead (2003)	View from the Vault IV (2003)

Professional ratings
Review scores
Source	Rating
Allmusic	4/5 stars
The Music Box	4/5 stars

Birth of the Dead is a two-CD compilation album chronicling the early years of the San Francisco psychedelic band the Grateful Dead. The set was originally part of the twelve-CD box set The Golden Road (1965–1973), released on October 16, 2001, then was released as a stand-alone album on March 25, 2003. The album consists of various studio and live tracks of seven original songs and a number of covers.

Birth of the Dead, Volume One (The Studio Sessions), containing the music from the first CD, was released as a vinyl LP on the Friday Music label on December 17, 2013.

== Recording ==
The two CDs are labeled "The Studio Sides" for the first CD and "The Live Sides" for the second. The Studio Sides comprise three separate recording sessions: "The Autumn Sessions", "The Scorpio Session", and "The Hendricks Session".

The Autumn Sessions was recorded at Golden State Recorders in San Francisco in November 1965. The band used the space under the assumed name of The Emergency Crew. The Scorpio Sessions comprise tracks seven through sixteen of disc one, two of which ("Don't Ease Me In" backed with "Stealin'") were released in limited supply by Scorpio Records, in July 1966, as the band's first single. The Hendricks Session, consisting of only the song "Fire in the City", was recorded for use in the documentary film Sons and Daughters. It was later released as a single by Verve Records.

== Track listing ==
Disc one
The Studio Sides

1. "Early Morning Rain" (Gordon Lightfoot) – 3:22
2. "I Know You Rider" (traditional) – 2:41
3. "Mindbender (Confusion's Prince)" (Jerry Garcia, Phil Lesh) – 2:41
4. "The Only Time Is Now" (Grateful Dead) – 2:24
5. "Caution (Do Not Stop on Tracks)" (Grateful Dead) – 3:17
6. "Can't Come Down" (Grateful Dead) – 3:04
7. "Stealin' (instrumental)" (Gus Cannon) – 2:40
8. "Stealin' (w/ vocals)" (Gus Cannon) – 2:36
9. "Don't Ease Me In (instrumental)" (traditional) – 2:01
10. "Don't Ease Me In (w/ vocals)" (traditional) – 2:02
11. "You Don't Have to Ask" (Grateful Dead) – 3:35
12. "Tastebud (instrumental)" (Ron McKernan) – 7:04
13. "Tastebud (w/ vocals)" (McKernan) – 4:35
14. "I Know You Rider" (traditional) – 2:36
15. "Cold Rain and Snow (instrumental)" (traditional) – 3:15
16. "Cold Rain and Snow (w/ vocals)" (traditional) – 3:17
17. "Fire in the City" (Peter Krug) – 3:19

Disc two
The Live Sides

1. "Viola Lee Blues" (Noah Lewis) – 9:39
2. "Don't Ease Me In" (traditional) – 2:43
3. "Pain in My Heart" (Naomi Neville) – 4:24
4. "Sitting on Top of the World" (Walter Vinson, Lonnie Chatmon) – 3:51
5. "It's All Over Now, Baby Blue" (Bob Dylan) – 5:12
6. "I'm a King Bee" (James Moore) – 8:52
7. "Big Boss Man" (Luther Dixon, Al Smith) – 5:11
8. "Standing on the Corner" (Grateful Dead) – 3:46
9. "In the Pines" (Slim Bryant, Clayton McMichen) – 4:55
10. "Nobody's Fault But Mine" (Blind Willie Johnson) – 4:15
11. "Next Time You See Me" (Earl Forest, Bill Harvey) – 2:47
12. "One Kind Favor" (Lightnin' Hopkins, Jules Taub) – 3:44
13. "He Was a Friend of Mine" (traditional) – 4:45
14. "Keep Rolling By" (traditional) – 7:57

== Personnel ==
Grateful Dead

- Jerry Garcia – guitar, vocals
- Bob Weir – guitar, vocals
- Phil Lesh – bass, vocals
- Bill Kreutzmann – drums
- Ron McKernan – organs, harmonica, vocals

Additional performers

- Jon Hendricks – lead vocals on Fire in the City

Production

Autumn Records sessions (disc one, tracks 1 to 6)

- Recorded on November 3, 1965, at Golden State Recorders in San Francisco
- Producers – Tom Donahue, Bobby Mitchell
- Engineer – Leo De Gar Kulka
- Disc One, tracks 5 and 6, were first released 9 November 1999 on So Many Roads (1965–1995) (Arista CD #GD-14066)
- all other selections from Autumn Records sessions are previously unissued
- note: tape box lists artist as: The Emergency Crew; a short-lived name the band used immediately prior to "Grateful Dead"

Scorpio Records sessions (disc one, tracks 7 to 16)

- Recorded during June 1966 at Buena Vista Studio in San Francisco, and Western Recording in San Francisco
- Producer, engineer – Gene Estribou
- Disc One, tracks 8 and 10, were previously issued locally (in limited quantity), in July 1966, as the Grateful Dead's first single (Scorpio Records #201), with Don't Ease Me In on the A-side. This is the "dry mix" – the single was mastered with added reverb
- All other selections from Scorpio Records sessions are previously unissued

"Fire in the City" (disc one, track 17)

- Recorded during March 1967 at Columbus Recorders in San Francisco
- Producer, arranger – Jon Hendricks
- Originally issued April 1967, as the A-side of a single (Verve #VK-10512) by Jon Hendricks. The Grateful Dead were the backing band

Live performances (all of disc two)

- Recorded in 1966 at the Fillmore Auditorium in San Francisco: Tracks 1–5 & 7–10 on July 16; Tracks 6 (and probably 11–14, though not yet confirmed) on July 17. More from the July 16 performance was released on So Many Roads
- Engineers – Owsley Stanley, Rock Scully
