= Shake Off the Demon =

Studio album by Brewer & Shipley
- Released: November 1971
- Recorded: Wally Heider (San Francisco)
- Genre: Folk rock
- Length: 31:28
- Label: Karma Sutra
- Producer: Brewer & Shipley

Brewer & Shipley chronology
| Tarkio (1970) | Shake Off the Demon (1971) | Rural Space (1972) |

Professional ratings
Review scores
| Source | Rating |
|---|---|
| Allmusic | 3/5 stars |

Shake Off the Demon (1971) is the fourth album released by Brewer & Shipley.

== Track listing ==
all songs Brewer & Shipley except where marked

Side A

1. "Shake Off the Demon" – 3:08
2. "Merciful Love" – 1:58
3. "Message from the Mission (Hold On)" – 3:09
4. "One by One" – 2:58
5. "When Everybody Comes Home" – 1:58

Side B

1. "Working On the Well" – 3:17
2. "Rock Me On the Water" (Jackson Browne) – 4:00
3. "Natural Child" – 3:46
4. "Back to the Farm" – 3:18
5. "Sweet Love" – 3:56

== Personnel ==
- Mike Brewer – vocals, guitars, piano, mouth harp, percussion
- Tom Shipley – vocals, guitars, bass, banjo
- Mark Naftalin – piano, organ, vibraphone
- John Kahn – bass
- John Cipollina – electric and slide electric guitars on "Shake Off the Demon"
- Spencer Dryden, "Little John" Harteman III, Glen Walters – drums
- José Areas, José "Chepito" Areas – congas, bongos, timbales
- David LaFlamme – electric violin
