= Tarkio (album) =

Studio album by Brewer & Shipley
- Released: 1970
- Studios: Wally Heider (San Francisco); University of Sioux Falls (Sioux Falls)
- Genres: Folk rock, country rock
- Length: 36:43
- Label: Kama Sutra Records
- Producer: Nick Gravenites

Brewer & Shipley chronology
Weeds (1969)	Tarkio (1970)	Shake Off The Demon (1971)

Tarkio is the third album by Brewer & Shipley. Released in 1970, the album (also known as Tarkio Road, as that title was printed on the labels of original pressings of the LP and pre-recorded tapes) yielded the hit singles "One Toke Over the Line," and "Tarkio Road."

The title came about when they left California in 1969 returning to the Midwest, this time to Kansas City, Missouri, where they played college towns in Iowa, Nebraska, Missouri, and Kansas. The title referred to songs that came to mind when they were driving to and from Kansas City to their gigs in Nebraska and Iowa on the 2-lane U.S. Route 59 which went through Tarkio, Missouri. In 2011, they held an outdoor concert in downtown Tarkio to celebrate the anniversary of the album. Some reports have erroneously indicated the album was inspired by a 1969 concert at the Mule Barn at Tarkio College but the group has maintained the song was based on the road.

Jerry Garcia contributed the steel guitar to the track "Oh Mommy". The album also features John Kahn and Bill Vitt on bass guitar and drums, respectively; they were regulars of The Jerry Garcia Band.

== Track listing ==
All tracks written by Brewer & Shipley except where noted.

Side A

1. "One Toke Over the Line" – 3:16
2. "Song from Platte River" – 3:15
3. "The Light" – 3:09
4. "Ruby on the Morning" – 2:15
5. "Oh Mommy" – 3:03

Side B

1. "Don't Want to Die in Georgia" – 3:45
2. "Can't Go Home" – 2:29
3. "Tarkio Road" – 4:30
4. "Seems Like a Long Time" (Ted Anderson) – 4:12
5. "Fifty States of Freedom" – 6:49

A CD reissue in 1996 added the following tracks

- "This Seat Occupado (Fly-Fly-Fly)" (Brewer & Shipley)
- "The Mighty Quinn" (Bob Dylan)

== Personnel ==
- Mike Brewer – vocals, guitars
- Tom Shipley – vocals, guitars
- Mark Naftalin – piano, organ
- John Kahn – bass
- Fred Burton – electric guitar
- Bill Vitt, Bob Jones – drums
- Noel Jewkes – flute
- Jerry Garcia – pedal steel guitar

Technical

- Stephen Barncard – engineer
- Nick Gravenites – producer

== Chart performance ==
Chart (1971)	Peak position
Australian Albums (Kent Music Report)	41
Canada Top Albums/CDs (RPM)	35
US Albums (Billboard 200)	34

Professional ratings
Review scores
Source	Rating
AllMusic	4/5 stars
Christgau's Record Guide	B−
