= Golden State Recorders =

Golden State Recorders was a San Francisco recording studio owned by Leo De Gar Kulka. Some of the albums recorded at the studio were Brewer & Shipley's second album Weeds in 1969, sessions for The Beau Brummels originally recorded between 1964–1966 and released as San Fran Sessions in 1996, and The Grateful Dead's Birth of the Dead, recorded in 1965 and released in 2003.

== History ==
The recording studio was opened by Kulka when he came to San Francisco in 1964. It was located at 665 Harrison Street, San Francisco, CA. It has been alleged in a Rolling Stone article that The Great Society were doing sessions in Golden State for what would be the release of "Somebody to Love" b/w "Free Advice", it took 286 takes to get it right. The producer was Sly Stone.

Some of the artists to come through the studio in the 1960s were Mike Bloomfield, Janis Joplin, Grace Slick and Sly Stone. In 1966, the Syndicate of Sound recorded their national hit Little Girl (Syndicate of Sound song) at Golden State Recorders

In 1967, some of the emerging acts geared towards the modern sound of the day to be recorded at the studio were, Bristol Boxkite, the Incorporates, Living Children, Poor Souls, Rear Exit, Stone Hinge and Ticket Angents. The producers that were working with him on these acts were Marty Cooper, Larry Goldberg, Jim Marino, Hank Levine and Don Ralke.

In the mid-1970s, the studio had acquired a Neumann disc mastering facility which according to Kulka was the most advanced in the area. In addition, most of what was taking place at the studio were connected with Kulka's College for the Recording Arts which was being used to teach students the aspects of sound recording.

Founder Kulka died on March 17, 1998, at age 77. Chief engineer David Tonelli died on January 14, 2014, aged 65.

== Staff ==
- Leo De Gar Kulka – Owner
- Brad Miller – Vice president, general manager
- Cher – Receptionist (rumored)
- Vance Frost – Assistant engineer 1968, Chief engineer and manager 1971–78
- David Tonelli – Chief Engineer
- Rob Masud – ?
- Marty Cooper – Producer
- Larry Goldberg – Producer
- Jim Marino – Producer
- Hank Levine – Producer
- Don Ralke – Producer

== Album highlights ==
- The Love Exchange (1968) – The Love Exchange
- Weeds (1969) – Brewer & Shipley
- Loosen Up Naturally, The Sons (both 1969) – Sons of Champlin

=== Later releases of early recordings ===
- Birth of the Dead – Grateful Dead; Autumn Sessions, November 1965
- Slyfest Freshest Funkiest Rarest Cuts – Sly and the Family Stone; four tracks recorded in 1966; Michael Briggs was the co-producer; released 1995
- San Fran Sessions – The Beau Brummels; originally recorded 1964–1966, released 1996
- Oaxaca – Vince Guaraldi; originally recorded March 1971, released 2004
