= Down in L.A. =

Studio album by Brewer & Shipley
- Released: October 1968
- Recorded: A&M
- Genre: Folk rock
- Length: 29:30
- Label: A&M
- Producers: Allen Stanton, Jerry Riopelle

Brewer & Shipley chronology
Down in L.A. (1968)	Weeds (1969)

Down in L.A. is the debut album released in 1968 by Brewer & Shipley. The album was reissued in 2012 on the label Now Sounds.

== Background ==
Mike Brewer said that Allen Stanton started out as the original producer for the pair's album, but that "he just didn't get the concept we were going for", and we "realized that it just wasn't working". Brewer elaborated that a "lot of our songs were in modal tuning and he just didn't get the concept of modes, and the orchestrations he had would sound like scary music". Brewer said they had to discard the majority of what had been produced by Stanton. Stanton then turned them over to Jerry Riopelle, who took them to finish the album at Leon Russell's Skyhill Studios, where Russell ended up playing all of the keyboards for the album. (Note: Leon Russell is credited as Russell Bridges on the album)

Brewer said the first song on the album Truly Right, was inspired by Tom Mastin. (Note: Mastin wrote the song How Do You feel on Jefferson Airplane's second album, Surrealistic Pillow.) He went on to say that Mastin "was just a tormented soul", and "you have to listen to the lyrics and draw your own conclusions". Truly Right was also the Nitty Gritty Dirt Band's second single. When asked about the inspiration behind the track, Keeper of the Keys, Brewer replied that, "The Lord of The Rings trilogy was really big at the time", and there was also a "little political commentary", because of the Civil Rights movement and the Vietnam War. Shipley, who wrote most of the lyrics for the song agreed, stating; "I didn't realize this until later but it was really inspired by what I had just gone through reading the Tolkien trilogy". Shipley, who wrote the song Time and Changes, said "it was about young lust", and he was "inspired by the song Wild Thing by the Troggs".

== Reception ==
Professional ratings
Review scores
Source	Rating
AllMusic	3/5 stars
The Rolling Stone Record Guide	2/5 stars
Uncut	9/10

American music editor John Haskins wrote in his review for The Kansas City Star that a "constant drum and twangy guitar background blends easily with the constantly twangy voices of Brewer and Shipley in this album that seems a total loss of time and effort". He described the harmony as being patterned after "early Beatle harmony-but not in the least original". He also noted that nearly all of the tracks "are set up on the same melody basis; the same harmony; the same tempo and one could go on with the sameness of the album", but admits that "there are those who appreciate redundancy".

Barney Glazer wrote in the Anaheim Bulletin, that the duo "draws from the seeds of grass roots folk and applied their progressive spirits to provide music strong in honestly and style and direct in its communication". He praised the pair for being "able lyricists and that their lyrics in these tracks provide the kind of communication that is personal in origin, universal in comment".

Wayne Harada said in The Honolulu Advertiser, that the album "introduces a duo who not only sing, but compose what is sophisticated folk-rock with a twist of pop". He highlighted the tracks Truly Right and An Incredible State of Affairs as being "best bets". Richie Unterberger from AllMusic said that their "first album was gentle late-'60s folk-rock with touches of pop and country", and that "it's pleasant but on the bland side, bearing some superficial resemblances to early Simon & Garfunkel in the duo's vocal harmonies".

Upon its reissue in 2012, Luke Torn wrote in Uncut, that the album " was instantly forgotten upon release, but ... the duo's dazzling vocal arrangements - intricate, soulful, brotherly - coincide with a pristine studio effort to startling effect". He praised the pairs "hypnotic songwriting that burns through". He also noted the reissue included bonus material: extensive notes, with photos and commentary from both Brewer & Shipley.

== Track listing ==
All tracks composed by Mike Brewer and Tom Shipley, except where indicated

Side A

1. "Truly Right" (Mike Brewer) – 2:46
2. "She Thinks She's a Woman" – 3:26
3. "Time and Changes" (Tom Shipley) – 2:05
4. "Small Town Girl" – 2:10
5. "I Can't See Her" – 2:50
6. "Green Bamboo" – 3:10

Side B

1. "An Incredible State of Affairs" – 3:10
2. "Keeper of the Keys" – 3:24
3. "Love, Love" (Brewer & Shipley, Keith Brewer) – 3:12
4. "Dreamin' in the Shade" – 2:10
5. "Mass for M'Lady" – 3:17

== Personnel ==
- Mike Brewer – vocals, guitars, percussion
- Tom Shipley – vocals, guitars, percussion
- Nick DeCaro – strings, horns
- Jim Gordon – drums
- Hal Blaine – drums
- Milt Holland – percussion
- Lyle Ritz – bass
- Jim Messina – bass
- Joe Osborn – bass
- Russell Bridges – electric piano, organ
- Mike Melvoin – organ
- Lance Wakely – electric guitar, harp
