= Rural Space =

Studio album by Brewer & Shipley
- Released: 1972
- Recorded: Wally Heider (San Francisco)
- Genre: Folk rock
- Length: 31:49
- Label: Karma Sutra
- Producer: Brewer & Shipley

Brewer & Shipley chronology
Shake Off The Demon (1971)	Rural Space (1972)	ST11261 (1974)

Professional ratings
Review scores
Source	Rating
Allmusic	link

Rural Space (1972) was the fifth album released by Brewer & Shipley.

== Track listing ==
all songs Brewer & Shipley except where marked

Side A

1. "Yankee Lady" (Jesse Winchester) – 3:25
2. "Sleeping On the Way" – 2:19
3. "When the Truth Finally Comes" – 2:33
4. "Where Do We Go from Here" – 2:17
5. "Blue Highway" (David Getz, Nick Gravenites) – 6:24

Side B

1. "Fly Fly Fly" – 3:08
2. "Crested Butte" (Michael Brewer) – 2:23
3. "Got to Get Off The Island" – 3:12
4. "Black Sky" (Steve Cash) – 3:39
5. "Have a Good Life" – 2:29

== Personnel ==
- Mike Brewer – vocals, guitars
- Tom Shipley – vocals, guitars
- Billy Mundi, Prairie Prince, Bill Vitt – drums
- Fred Burton – electric guitars
- Mark Naftalin – piano, organ, vibraphone
- John Kahn – bass
- Phil Howe – soprano saxophone
- Buddy Cage – pedal steel guitar
