= ST11261 =

Studio album by Brewer & Shipley
- Released: 1974
- Recorded: Wally Heider (San Francisco)
- Genre: Folk rock
- Length: 34:08
- Label: Capitol
- Producer: John Boylan

Brewer & Shipley chronology
Rural Space (1972)	ST11261 (1974)	Welcome to Riddle Bridge (1976)

Professional ratings
Review scores
Source	Rating
Allmusic	2/5 stars

ST11261 (1974) was the sixth album released by Brewer & Shipley.

The album's title refers to its Capitol Records catalog number, a device previously used by Peter, Paul & Mary (Album 1700, 1967), and which would later be used for albums released by Dave Davies (AFL1-3603, 1980) and Yes (90125, 1983). In the 2021 documentary on Brewer & Shipley One Toke Over the Line ... and Still Smokin', Mike Brewer explains that the decision to name the album after its catalog number followed an encounter with a record executive who referred to the artists' music as "product."

Stephen Stills's band Manassas recorded Brewer's song "Bound to Fall" for their 1972 debut album, two years in advance of its appearance on ST11261.

== Track listing ==
all songs Brewer & Shipley except where marked

Side A

1. "Fair Play" (Steve Canaday) – 4:53
2. "It Did Me In" (Mark Baysinger) – 2:43
3. "Look Up, Look Out" – 2:55
4. "Shine So Strong" (Mike Brewer) – 3:05
5. "How Are You" – 3:55

Side B

1. "Eco-Catastrophe Blues" – 3:15
2. "Keeper Of The Keys" – 3:52
3. "Bound To Fall" (Mike Brewer, Tom Mastin) – 2:15
4. "Oh So Long" – 2:25
5. "Ballad of a Country Dog" (Mike Brewer) – 4:50

== Personnel ==
- Mike Brewer - vocals, guitars
- Tom Shipley - vocals, guitars
- Gary Mallaber & Russ Kunkel - drums
- Larry Knight, Jesse Ed Davis - electric guitars
- John Boylan - keyboards
- Doug Haywood - bass
- Sneaky Pete Kleinow - pedal steel guitar
