= Oaxaca (album) =

Compilation album by Vince Guaraldi
- Released: October 19, 2004
- Recorded: 1970–1971
- Venues: In Your Ear, Palo Alto, California; The Matrix, San Francisco, California
- Studios: Golden State Recorders, San Francisco, California
- Genres: Jazz; funk; soul
- Length: 53:05
- Labels: D & D
- Producers: David Guaraldi; Michael Graves

Vince Guaraldi chronology
The Charlie Brown Suite & Other Favorites (2003)	Oaxaca (2004)	North Beach (2006)

Professional ratings
Review scores
Source	Rating
All About Jazz	3.5/5 stars
Five Cents Please	4/5 stars

Oaxaca is a compilation album by American jazz pianist Vince Guaraldi released by D & D Records (Guaraldi's briefly resurrected label) in 2004. The album is a mix of previously unreleased studio and live recordings taped in 1970 and 1971.

== Background ==
In the mid-2000s, Vince Guaraldi's son, David Guaraldi, worked with audio archivist Michael Graves at his Atlanta, Georgia-based Osiris Studio, in an effort to restore a wealth of unreleased recorded material from his father's archives. The recordings on Oaxaca come from a variety of sources: some songs were performed live at In Your Ear, a jazz club based in Palo Alto, California; one is performed at The Matrix in San Francisco, with remaining tracks taped at Golden State Recorders in San Francisco.

The release features covers of The Rolling Stones' "You Can't Always Get What You Want" and The Beatles' "Something" and "You Never Give Me Your Money", both from Abbey Road.

Oaxaca was released on CD only. It did not receive a vinyl release.

== Critical reception ==
All About Jazz critic David Rickert commented that Oaxaca "could be called In A Silent Way, Charlie Brown," adding that Guaraldi is "powered by a rhythm section well versed in providing a driving rock beat. Armed with an arsenal of electronic devices, they turn 'You Can't Always Get What You Want' into a ferocious squall, yet display a gentler touch on 'Something.' It's a testament to Guaraldi's abilities as a musician that all this works as well as it does, and his treatments of these relatively new songs show a skill at interpretation that was never quite apparent in his early days as a pianist dealing with standards." Rickert concluded by saying, "it should come as no surprise that Guaraldi is still capable of crafting amazingly catchy melodies, and the title track is one of his finest."

Derrick Bang, Guaraldi historian and author of Vince Guaraldi at the Piano, described the title track as "a catchy little tune full of sparkle and sass, which sounds like it could have been a Peanuts theme."

== Track listing ==
All tracks are written by Vince Guaraldi, except where noted.

No.	Title	Writer(s)	Length
1.	"Charlie Brown Blues" (aka "Play It Again, Charlie Brown"/"Charlie's Blues"^{[a]})		5:00
2.	"Oaxaca^{[a]}"		3:10
3.	"We've Only Just Begun^{[a]}"	Paul Williams; Roger Nichols	4:54
4.	"You Can't Always Get What You Want" (live)	Mick Jagger; Keith Richards	16:13
5.	"Something" (live)	George Harrison	3:55
6.	"You're a Good Sport, Charlie Brown (Centercourt)"		2:35
7.	"Watch What Happens" (live, incomplete^{[b]})	Norman Gimbel; Antoine Le Grand	5:40
8.	"You Never Give Me Your Money^{[a]}"	John Lennon; Paul McCartney	6:53
9.	"Oaxaca" (alternate take)		4:46
Total length:			53:05

Notes
^{^[a]} recorded at Golden State Recorders, March 31, 1971
^{^[b]} from the film The Umbrellas of Cherbourg (1964)

== Personnel ==
Credits adapted from CD liner notes.

Vince Guaraldi Quartet

- Vince Guaraldi – piano, Fender Rhodes, Hammond B-3, clavinet
- Vince Denham – saxophone, flute
- Koji Kataoka – electric bass
- Mike Clark – drums

Additional

- Derrick Bang – liner notes
- David Guaraldi – producer
- Michael Graves – engineer (audio restoration), producer

== See also ==
- Vince Guaraldi discography
- List of songs recorded by Vince Guaraldi
- List of cover versions of Vince Guaraldi songs
- Lee Mendelson Film Productions
