= Alice Lon =

American singer, dancer, and television personality (1926–1981)

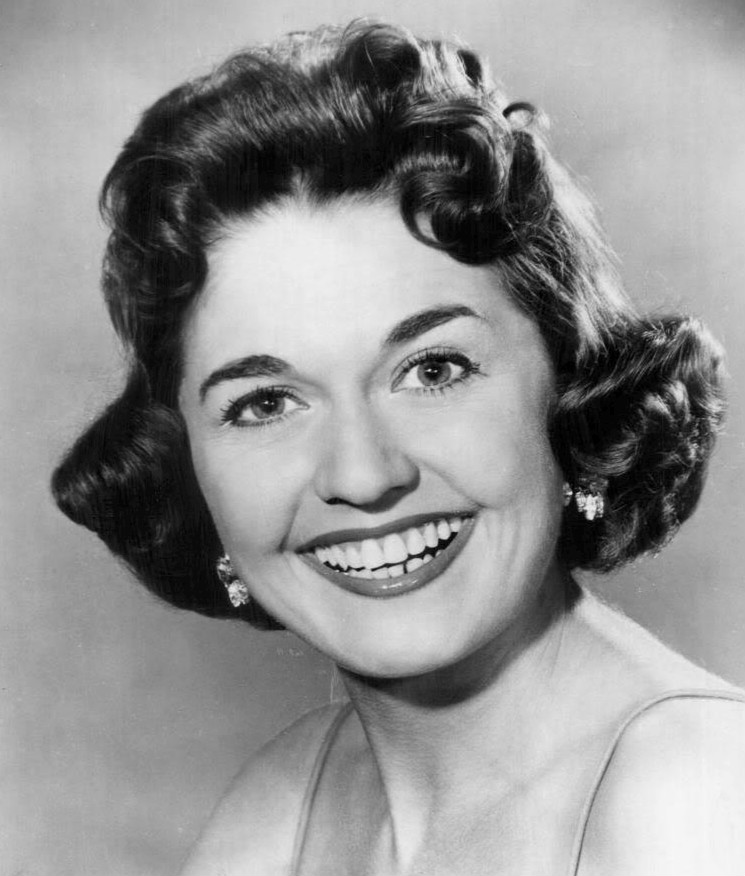
- Alice Lon in 1959
- Born: Alice Lon Wyche; November 23, 1926; Cooper, Texas, U.S.
- Died: April 24, 1981 (aged 54); Dallas, Texas, U.S.
- Occupations: Vocalist, dancer

Alice Lon Wyche (November 23, 1926 – April 24, 1981), known as Alice Lon, was an American singer and dancer on The Lawrence Welk Show during its early years on network television.

== Early years ==
Alice Lon Wyche was born on November 23, 1926, in Cooper, Texas. By age 6, she was taking lessons in piano, singing, and dancing. When she was 10, she was featured as a singer, earning $20 per week on her own radio program in Henderson, Texas. In her teens, she traveled across Texas, performing in a variety of venues. She attended Kilgore College in Texas and was a member of the school's Rangerettes dance team.

== Biography ==
Throughout the big-band era and the years that followed, each of Lawrence Welk's female vocalists was always nicknamed "The Champagne Lady". Lon assumed the title in 1955, during the TV program's first season. Her alto singing voice graced Welk's show weekly until 1959, when she left the show over musical and money issues, although a popular legend developed that she was fired for showing too much leg and for crossing her feet on Welk's desk, something he didn't like. Viewers missed the popular Alice Lon, and Welk received many messages in the American Broadcasting Company mailbox demanding that she be rehired. Welk tried to bring her back, but she refused and was ultimately replaced in 1960 by Norma Zimmer. Lawrence and Lon eventually reconciled personally, but never worked together professionally again.

On Welk's show, Lon was known for wearing particularly full skirts with colorful petticoats designed by her mother, Lois Wyche, as she told TV Guide. She gave instructions in the article on how viewers might make their own petticoats.

She recorded an album for Coral Records titled It's Alice with orchestra directed by George Cates, the musical supervisor for Welk's show. The liner notes provide the following: "Miss Lon, first introduced by Welk as "Alice from Dallas", began singing, dancing and playing the piano at six. By the time she was ten, the precocious young singer was appearing on her own sponsored radio show.

In her teens she began touring her native Texas playing theaters, veterans' hospitals and army camps until she was signed by Interstate Theaters in Dallas. Appearing on the Interstate circuit, she also starred on its weekly radio show, "Showtime", emanating from the Palace Theater in Dallas. While touring for Interstate, she was invited to appear on the Don McNeill's famous radio show The Breakfast Club in Chicago, an engagement that was to be the first of a great many radio and TV appearances in that area.

== Family ==
Lon was married to Bob Waterman, with whom she had three sons, Bobby, Clint and Larry. After she and Waterman divorced, she married George Bowling. On the night of June 13, 1955, Lon and her family were victims of a violent robbery in their North Hollywood, California home.

== Death ==
She died April 24, 1981, at Baylor University Medical Center at Dallas. The cause of death was scleroderma, an autoimmune disease.
