= Apples and Bananas (instrumental) =

Single by Lawrence Welk and His Orchestra

from the album Apples and Bananas
- B-side: "Theme from 'The Addams Family'"
- Released: 1965
- Genre: Instrumental pop
- Length: 2:07
- Label: Dot Records
- Songwriter: Frank Scott
- Producers: George Cates, Lawrence Welk & Randy Wood

"Apples and Bananas" is an instrumental composition released by Lawrence Welk and His Orchestra in 1965. The single spent 4 weeks on the Billboard Hot 100 chart, peaking at No. 75, while reaching No. 17 on Billboard's Middle-Road Singles chart. "Apples and Bananas" was most successful in Chicago, where it reached No. 11 on WLS's "Silver Dollar Survey".

"Apples and Bananas" was the lead song of an album by the same name released by Lawrence Welk and His Orchestra in 1965, which spent 12 weeks on Billboard's chart of Top LPs, peaking at No. 57.

== Chart performance ==
| Chart (1965) | Peak position |
|---|---|
| US Billboard Hot 100 | 75 |
| US Billboard Middle-Road Singles | 17 |
