= Little Girl (Syndicate of Sound song) =

Single by Syndicate of Sound

from the album Little Girl
- B-side: "You"
- Released: April 1966
- Recorded: January 9, 1966
- Studio: Golden State, San Francisco
- Genre: Garage rock; pop rock
- Length: 2:25
- Label: Hush, Bell
- Songwriters: Don Baskin; Bob Gonzalez
- Producer: Garrie Thompson

Syndicate of Sound singles chronology
"Prepare for Love" (1966)	"Little Girl" (1966)	"Rumors" (1966)

"Little Girl" is a song recorded by the California garage rock group Syndicate of Sound, and written by Don Baskin and Bob Gonzalez of the band. It reached the US national pop charts in June 1966, peaking at #5 on Cash Box and #8 on Billboard.

== Background ==
After winning a Bay Area "Battle of the Bands" contest in 1965, the Syndicate of Sound recorded a single "Prepare For Love", which was ultimately unsuccessful. Don Baskin and Bob Gonzales then wrote "Little Girl", which the band recorded at Golden State Recorders in San Francisco on January 9, 1966. Hush Records released the single in April 1966. After becoming a regional hit around the San Jose, California area, Bell Records picked it up for national distribution, the label then offered them an album contract. Prior to going into the studio, Larry Ray was replaced on lead guitar by Jim Sawyers. The album was recorded in three weeks, after which the band embarked on a nationwide tour supporting among others, Paul Revere & the Raiders, the Young Rascals and the Yardbirds.

== Chart history ==
Chart (1966)	Peak position
New Zealand (Listener)	14
U.S. Billboard Hot 100	8

== Other recordings ==
- The Residents as part of their Third Reich 'n Roll album of 1976.
- British group The Banned had a UK hit with it in 1977, reaching #36 in December.
- The Dead Boys on their first album Young, Loud and Snotty, released in 1977.
- Australian group Divinyls released their own version of the song titled "Hey Little Boy" in 1988. It went to #23 on the Australian charts.
- R.E.M. played the song in their very early shows.

== Personnel ==
- Don Baskin – vocals, guitar
- Bob Gonzalez – bass guitar
- John Sharkey – keyboards
- Larry Ray – lead guitar
- John Duckworth – drums

== See also ==
- List of 1960s one-hit wonders in the United States

== Sources ==
- Cost, Jud (1997). Little Girl (Liner notes). Syndicate of Sound. Sundazed. SC 6120.
- Savage, Jon (2015). 1966: The Year the Decade Exploded. London: Faber & Faber. ISBN 978-0-571-27762-9 – via the Internet Archive.
