= Garrie Thompson =

American filmmaker, host and broadcaster

- Born: Garrie Emory Thompson; September 18, 1927; Salt Lake City, Utah, United States
- Died: June 29, 2018 (aged 90)
- Other name: Gary Thompson
- Occupations: Record label owner, publisher, producer
- Children: 5

Garrie Emory Thompson (September 18, 1927 – June 29, 2018) was a record label owner, producer and band manager. He ran the Hush and Duane Record labels. he was the producer of "Little Girl" for Syndicate of Sound.

== Background ==
He was born on September 18, 1927, in Salt Lake City, Utah to parents Garrie and Clara Thompson.

He was the president of Duane Music Inc., and Hush Records. As a publisher, the music included "Little Girl" by Syndicate of Sound, "Warm and Tender Love" by Percy Sledge and "My Adorable One" by Joe Simon. He was also the manager for Syndicate of Sound and produced their hit single "Little Girl".

His father Garrie who was the manager of Joe Simon died on April 23, 1972, at the age of 66.

Along with his partner Gordon McWilliams who co-ran Anesco Construction Co., he is credited with the creation design of the stars on the Hollywood Walk of Fame. in 1955, the Hollywood Improvement Program were looking to give the community a better look. Anesco Construction were also looking for new clients at that time. Coming up with an idea to place stars with actors names and also paying tribute to the movie business, a prototype was presented to the Improvement Program, which a shiny brass brown terrazzo star with John Wayne's name on it. They also put forward their business to do the construction. The decision makers loved the idea and meetings at the Brown Derby restaurant to discuss who in the industry would be deserving of the stars.

== Music career ==
Thompson worked as an engineer for Lockheed, (Missile Systems Division. One of his co-workers was the father of Bob Gonzalez, the bass guitarist for Syndicate of Sound. He produced their song "Little Girl" with Don Baskin on vocals and released it on his Hush label. It became a regional hit in California courtesy of radio KLIV in San Jose. The record caught the attention of Bell Records in New York who distributed it nationally. This then resulted in an album being recorded. The song peaked at number 8 on Billboard in May 1966.

In 1978, with Don Baskin, he co-produced the self-titled album for country rock band Wichita. It was released on the Hush label.

== Death ==
He died on June 29, 2018, leaving behind his wife of 72 years, 5 children and grandchildren.

== duane records ==
He was also connected with duane records, a label which released recordings by Roy Montague and Wm. Penn and the Quakers. The duane label was also connected with the Twilight label as well as his Hush label. With Wm Penn & the Quakers, Thompson produced their "Coming Up My Way" bw "Care Free" single which was released on Duane 104.

== Hush Records ==
Similarly with Duane Music, Inc., Hush Records wasn't confined to any particular genre. Rock and Soul recordings were released on the label. In 1959, according to Cash Box, the owners of Hush Records were Mr. and Mrs. Garrie Thompson. They were actually Garrie Snr. and Clara Thompson, the parents of Garrie who was to run Hush in the 1960s. That year, "Doctor, Doctor" bw "Louise" was released on Hush 1000. Some of the early releases also include The Golden Tones which featured singer Joe Simon. One of which was "Little Island Girl" bw "Doreetha" on Hush G 101.

Wm. Penn & the Quakers recorded their version of "Little Girl" bw "Someboady's Dum Dum. It was released on Hush G 230. In 1968, "Doctor Dear (Do You Think I'm Blind)" bw "Do You Hear" by The Diminished 5th. was released on Hush G 231.

In 1997, The Hush Records Story (Nuggets From The Golden State) a various artists compilation, was released on Big Beat CDWIKD 154. It featured artists from his Hush label, many that he produced himself.

=== Artists ===
The Brogues

The Brogues were a group from California. It was made up of Ed Rodrigues on guitar, Rick Campbell on organ and bass, Bill Whittington on bass and guitar, and Greg Elmore on drums. Later on Gary Duncan was to join the group. They had success with their single "Someday". Peaking at number 31 on KAFY in on Bakersfield and reaching number 14 on radio station KYOS, it became a regional hit for them. Adding Gary Cole on keyboards, they released another single, "Don’t Shoot Me Down" bw "I Ain't No Miracle Worker".

The Diminished Fifth aka The Diminished 5th

They were all high school students from around the Albany / Berkeley area. They consisted of Kenleigh Hall on guitar and vocals, Laura Dendy on vocals, Tony Newton on drums, Earl Nelson on bass and Minor Carlson on guitar. They were probably discovered by Clara Thompson. They had a 45 "Doctor Dear (Do You Think I'm Blind)" bw "Do You Hear" released on Hush G-231.

Wm Penn & the Quakers

Wm Penn & the Quakers were a different group to the William Penn Fyve. They also had no connection to the similarly named William Penn & the Quakers who recorded "California Sun", released on Melron 5013. That group actually had a member called William Penn. The Wm Penn crew lineup included Dan White, Jim Slade, Jo Ann Gunther, Lonny Gunther and Jeff Blanskma. In addition to their release on Hush G 230, they also released "Goodbye My Love" bw "Ghost Of The Monks" on Twilight 45-410 in 1967 and "Coming Up My Way" bw "Care Free" on duane 104 in 1968.

Joe Simon

Between 1960 and 1962, Joe Simon had five solo singles released on the Hush label. These were his first solo releases. He had also been part of the group, The Golden Tones which had singles released on the same label. Simon would later hit it big with "The Chokin' Kind" in 1969, "Power of Love" in 1972 and "Get Down, Get Down (Get on the Floor)" in 1975.
