= Sparkle Time =

American 1940s musical radio program

- Other names: Sparkle Time with Meredith Willson
- Country of origin: United States
- Language: English
- Syndicates: CBS
- Starring: Meredith Willson
- Directed by: Myron Dutton
- Produced by: John Bates; Myron Dutton
- Original release: October 4, 1946 – March 28, 1947
- Sponsored by: Canada Dry

Sparkle Time was a musical radio program in the United States. It was broadcast on CBS October 4, 1946 - March 28, 1947.

== Background ==
Meredith Willson was the orchestra leader on the George Burns and Gracie Allen radio program. He headed Maxwell House Coffee Time as the summer replacement for that show for 13 weeks beginning June 6, 1946. Executives at Canada Dry decided to sponsor a similar program with Willson at the helm beginning in the fall of 1946. The name Sparkle Time was selected as a reminder "of the fizz of the sponsor's beverage."

The program's advertising led to an award for J.M. Mathes Inc. "for the creation of the most effective direct selling, sponsored program, Canada Dry Sparkle Time" for 1946. The recognition came from the Committee on National Radio Awards of the City College of New York.

Citing a shortage of sugar, Canada Dry dropped its sponsorship of Sparkle Time effective March 28, 1947, and that ended the program.

== Format ==
Sparkle Time featured a combination of music and comedy much like that found in many other programs of its era. One thing that set it apart, however, was its delivery of commercials, described as "a unique approach to support [Willson's] sponsors." A five-member group, Talking People, spoke the words in commercials in unison. The technique "caught on with the public, sponsors, and even media critics who were impressed with the concept and its results."

=== Discovery Department ===
The program had a regular feature called "Discovery Department," in which a relatively unknown entertainer was given exposure on network radio. Those introduced in that segment included the following:

- Annette Warren, "accomplished concert pianist and singer .. making her radio debut" (October 4, 1946)
- Jean Nelson, a mezzo-soprano who had performed on two USO tours (November 8, 1946)
- Ernie Felice, "young accordion stylist whose playing has done much to take the instrument out of the mazurka and polka class and into swing" (November 22, 1946)
- Marion Francis, "promising young Hollywood singer" (January 3, 1947)
- Sam Salop, a singer and AAF veteran who lost both arms in World War II (January 17, 1947)
- Rece Saxon, a mezzo-soprano who had "been featured as soloist at the Hollywood Bowl and in concert with Werner Jannssen's Symphony Orchestra." (January 31, 1947)
- Ralph Isbell, a bass singer who won the 1946 Atwater Kent auditions (February 14, 1947)
- Norma Zimmer, a member of Willson's Talking People group (and who later became a featured performer on The Lawrence Welk Show on television, made her solo debut on radio (February 28, 1947)
- Dorothy Wade, a violinist who played a violin that was made in 1704 and was given to her by Jascha Heifetz (March 7, 1947)
- Teresa Piper, 18-year-old lyric soprano from Canada, who had sung with the Toronto Symphony Orchestra (March 28, 1947)

== Personnel ==
Sparkle Time featured Meredith Willson and his orchestra—Willson's first opportunity to have "his own show on prime time radio."

The program's choral group was Talking People, described in an article in a trade publication as "a unique group of radio commercial renderers" and as a "group of five who talk as one." Willson directed the group much as he would an orchestra. The original five members were John Rarig, Betty Allan, Bob Hanlon, Norma Zimmer, and Maxwell Smith.

Paulena Carter was the pianist, and Ben Gage was a singer and the announcer.

John Bates was the initial producer; Myron Dutton was the director and later became producer.
