= Stockholm (instrumental) =

Single by Lawrence Welk and His Orchestra

from the album Early Hits of 1964
- B-side: "The Girl from Barbados"
- Released: 1964
- Genre: Easy listening
- Length: 1:58
- Label: Dot Records
- Songwriter: George Cates

Lawrence Welk and His Orchestra singles chronology
"Blue Velvet" (1963)	"Stockholm" (1964)	"Hello, Dolly!" (1964)

"Stockholm" is an instrumental composition released by Lawrence Welk and His Orchestra in 1964. The single spent 2 weeks on the Billboard Hot 100 chart, peaking at No. 91.

"Stockholm" was the lead song of the album Early Hits of 1964, released by Lawrence Welk and His Orchestra in 1964, which spent 19 weeks on Billboard's chart of Top LPs, peaking at No. 37.
