= Len Stark =

American filmmaker, host and broadcaster

- Born: Leonard Stark
- Occupation: Record producer
- Known for: Record production, composer, record label owner

Len Stark was a Philadelphia-based record label owner, composer and producer. He founded the Melron Records label which acts such as William Penn and the Quakers, Essau, Rocky Brown, Bobby Eli, Pheasants and Colly Williams recorded for.

== Background ==
Stark was the owner of Melron Records, a label he established in 1961. He also ventured into recording himself and recorded "Maybe I'm Just Foolish". Years later in 2012, it would be released on the Rockin' & Boppin' Billy In Philly various artists compilation. Stark was writing songs while working at an 8pm till 4am job as a produce checker for Samuel P. Mandell & Company at the Pennsylvania Produce Terminal, a job he had been working at for the past six years.

== Career ==
Stark was writing music as early as 1956. By November that year, Stark and Dan Franklin, who was his Hollywood-based music partner, had a composition recorded by a well-known group, The Clips. "Kiss Away" was released that year on Calvert 105. Having established the Melron in 1961, Stark had an album and several singles out on his label that year with the artists on his roster. The album was by the Christian Lights. One of the singles was by the Israelites, a new gospel group he was working with. The single they had released was "I'm Building a Home". Other singles were by Lori Ann with "Bobby", The Allures with "Lovin' Him" and Danny Bassett with "If You Want Me".

Along with Tony Luisi, Stark produced "King of Love" which is described in A House on Fire: The Rise and Fall of Philadelphia Soul as an early example of an r&b song that served as a bridge to Philadelphia soul. It was released on Melron 5009 in mid-1964.

In 1980, Stark collaborated with Bobby Eli and in light of the Iran hostage crisis they recorded a single "American Message To The Hostages" which was released on Melron 5040 in 1980. It was dedicated to the hostages and their families. Eli was a founding member of MFSB and pioneer of the Philly sound.

== Melron Records ==
Operating from 1961, the label was headquartered at 5007 F St., Philadelphia. Its earlierst releases included recordings by The Allures and Lori Ann. It was a small independent label with the majority of its output in the 1960s.

In June 1962, Rocky Brown's "Den of Love" bw "Why?" was released on Melron 5001. It was given a 3 star rating by Billboard. It was produced by a young Bobby Eli.

In 1967, Danny Bassett had "Day After Day" bw "Teenage Soldier" released on the Melron 5011. By November that year, William Penn & the Quakers had a single, "California Sun" out on Melron 5013, Not to be confused with The William Penn Fyve, or the similarly named Wm Penn & the Quakers recorded for Duane Records label from Sunnyvale, California, this group actually had a member who was called William Penn. Besides William aka Bill Penn, the other members were Lou Altimari, Wayne Carangi, Paul Mc Nulty and Joe Powell. The following year, Rena Faye And The Teddy Bear Co. has their single "Thank You Baby" bw "Do It" released on Melron 5015.

The label was still active in December 1980 with the release of the "American Message To The Hostages" single, and to date had released at least two dozen singles and an album.

In July, 2008, The Best of Melron Records: The Early Philly Sound was released on Philly Soul PH 002CD. Artists included Essau & His Group, Emerson Brown & Del Rios, Bobby Eli & Del Rios, Colly Williams & Allures, Sweethearts, Howard Churchill & Radars, Lori Ann and her group etc.

A couple of songs from the label "Big Butters", Pts 1 and 2 by Bobby Eli and "Out of the Mist" by The Pheasants were featured on CITR-FM's Shake A Tail Feather Episode which was Broadcast on 12-Dec-2008.

=== List of artists ===
- The Alley Cats
- The Allures
- Angelle
- Angels of Mercy
- Danny Bassett
- Emerson Brown & Del Rios
- Rocky Brown
- The Christian Light Quintet
- Howard Churchill & Radars
- Bobby Eli
- Bobby Eli & Del Rios
- Essau
- Essau & His Group
- Rena Faye and the Teddy Bear Co.
- The Intentions
- The Israelites
- Dolly McCoy & The Shabells
- Fred Martin, Jr's Revue
- Johnny Mendell
- The Intentions
- Lori Ann
- Ronnie Mendell with Frank Mooney and the Memories
- William Penn and the Quakers
- The Pheasants
- The Philadelphians
- The Revelators
- Len Stark
- Sensational Starlights
- The Sweethearts
- Colly Williams & Allures
- Colly Williams & His Group

== Death ==
Len Stark had already passed away prior to his son Ronald's death on May 20, 2009.
