= Norma Zimmer =

American vocalist (1923–2011)

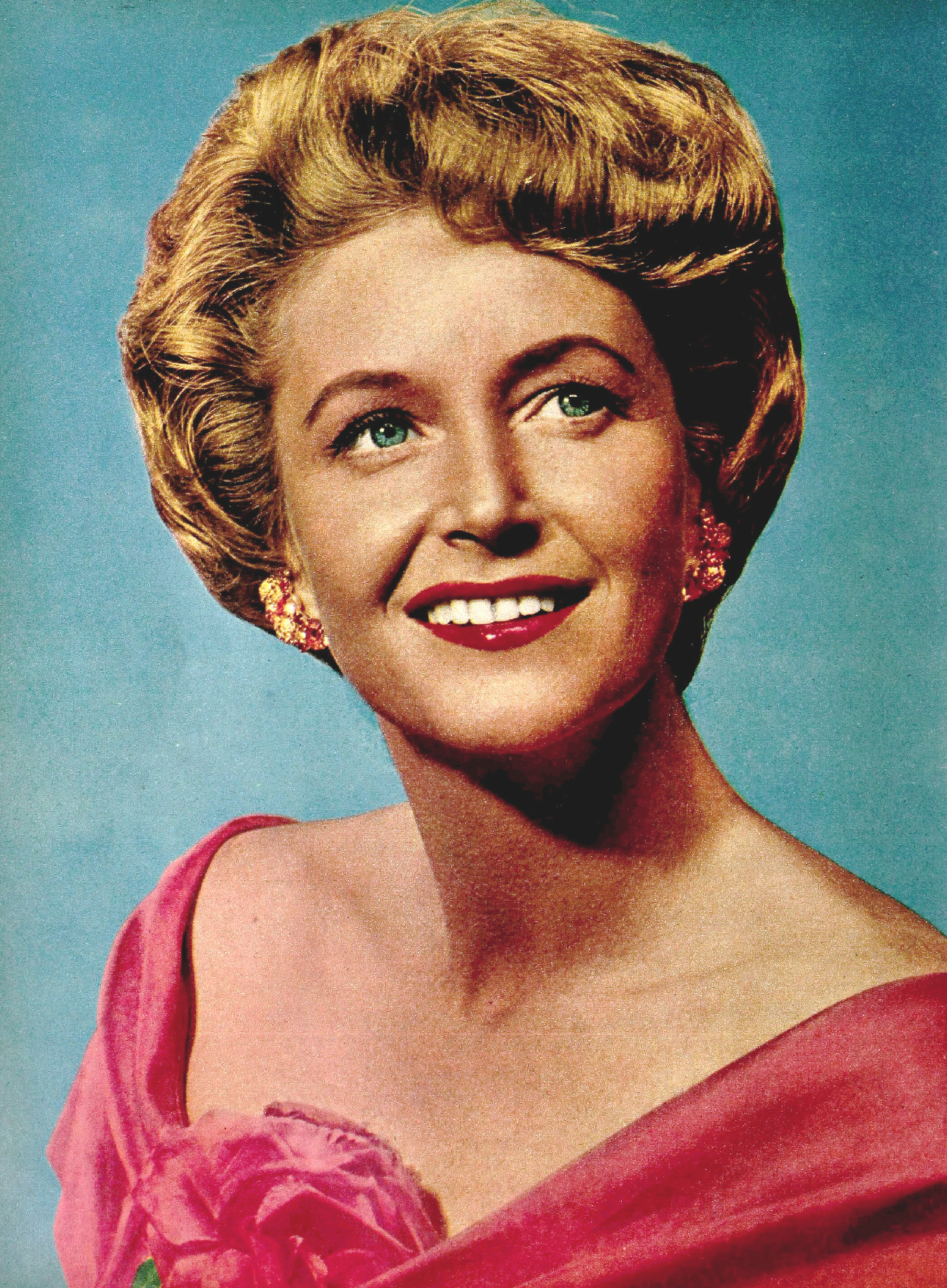
- Zimmer in 1961

Background information
- Born: Norma Larsen; July 13, 1923; Larson, Idaho, U.S.
- Died: May 10, 2011 (aged 87) Brea, California, U.S.
- Occupation: Vocalist
- Formerly of: Norman Luboff Choir, Ken Darby Singers

Norma Zimmer (July 13, 1923 – May 10, 2011) was an American vocalist, best remembered for her 22-year tenure as Lawrence Welk's "Champagne Lady" on The Lawrence Welk Show.

== Early years ==
Born Norma Larsen on a dairy farm in Shoshone County, Idaho, she grew up in Seattle, Washington after her father moved the family west when she was two years old. Her father was a violin teacher, and Zimmer had hoped to play that instrument until he told her that her hands were too small. She was offered a scholarship to Seattle University, but chose to continue vocal studies.

Zimmer was singing in a church choir when a guest artist suggested she travel to Los Angeles, California, and audition for a musical group. When she turned 18, she did just that, singing with a succession of top vocal groups, including the Norman Luboff Choir and the Ken Darby Singers, among others.

== Radio ==
Zimmer's radio network debut as a soloist came February 28, 1947, on Sparkle Time. At that time, she performed weekly on the program as a member of The Singers vocal group. She later became the soloist on Standard School.

== Film and television ==
Zimmer appeared on most of the popular television variety shows during the 1950s. She landed a small singing part in the Bing Crosby movie Mr. Music (1950), and provided the singing voice for the White Rose in the Disney film Alice in Wonderland (1951). She worked as a studio singer and performed on Welk's 1956 Thanksgiving album. Zimmer dubbed the singing voice of Jessie Matthews for the 1958 film tom thumb.

=== The Lawrence Welk Show ===
In 1959, the previous Champagne Lady, Alice Lon, left the show because of monetary and scheduling disagreements. Due to protests, Welk tried (and failed) to get Lon back. After a year of the show trying out several different singers, Zimmer officially joined The Lawrence Welk Show as his Champagne Lady on New Year's Eve, 1960. Zimmer stayed on the show and traveled with Welk and the band on personal appearances for three years.

As her two sons were growing up, Zimmer decided to leave show business to raise her children. Welk told her it was all right for her to quit the road tours, but he asked her to stay on the television show until he could find another singer. Each week, a new girl came on as a possible replacement, but Welk kept asking Zimmer to come back the following week. That went on for twenty years. As the show's Champagne Lady, Zimmer sang one solo and often a duet (usually with Jimmy Roberts); she frequently danced with Welk at the end of the show.

== Recordings ==
Zimmer sang as lead soprano with the Norman Luboff Choir, Voices of Walter Schumann, Pete King Chorale, and the Ken Darby Singers. She also sang with a quartet, The Girlfriends, along with Betty Allan and others. They sang backup for singers including Frank Sinatra, Dean Martin and Perry Como. Their group sang backup for the famous Bing Crosby version of Irving Berlin's "White Christmas".

Zimmer also recorded solo albums for Word Records.

== Christian music ==
In 1972, Zimmer "traveled about 80,000 miles singing God's praises at religious concerts." She sang with the Billy Graham Crusade and on the Hour of Power, and was a soloist at a White House service during the Nixon Administration. In addition, Zimmer recorded a number of albums devoted to traditional Christian music.

== Other activities ==
Zimmer painted as a hobby. She created more than 100 paintings, primarily portraits. In business matters, she and her husband owned the ski lodge at Kratka Ridge and had a mobile home park with more than 100 spaces.

== Personal life and death ==
She married builder and property developer Randy Zimmer in 1944, and settled in Los Angeles. They were married for 64 years, until Randy's death in 2008. The couple had two sons, Mark and Ron.

In 2011, Zimmer died at her home in Brea, California, at the age of 87.

== Bibliography ==
- Zimmer, Norma (1977). Norma. Tyndale House. ISBN 978-0842347167.
