= One Toke Over the Line =

Single by Brewer & Shipley

from the album Tarkio
- B-side: "Oh Mommy"
- Released: March 1971
- Genre: Rock
- Length: 3:16
- Label: Kama Sutra Records
- Songwriters: Mike Brewer, Tom Shipley
- Producer: Nick Gravenites

Brewer & Shipley singles chronology
"One Toke Over the Line" (1971)	"Tarkio Road" (1971)

"One Toke Over the Line" is a song written and performed by American folk rock duo Brewer & Shipley. It is a track from their 1970 LP Tarkio, and was released as their debut single in early 1971.

== Background ==
Mike Brewer gives this account of the origin of the song, "One day we were pretty much stoned and all and Tom says, 'Man, I'm one toke over the line tonight.' I liked the way that sounded and so I wrote a song around it."

The song gained popular acclaim while the band was touring as an opening act for Melanie, after they received an encore but had run out of other songs to play.

In a 2012 interview, Brewer said "The president of the record company we were with at the time came backstage and said, 'Oh man, you gotta record that and add it to the LP.' We were kind of like, 'Really? Oh well, OK.' We didn't even take the song seriously. Needless to say it came as a big surprise to us that they released it and not only that it was a big hit but it received so much controversy. The government came down on us."

In 1971, the Federal Communications Commission issued guidance to radio station operators: "Whether a particular record depicts the dangers of drug abuse, or, to the contrary, promotes such illegal drug usage is a question for the judgment of the licensee. Such a pattern of operation is clearly a violation of the basic principle of the licensee's responsibility for, and duty to exercise adequate control over, the broadcast material presented over his station. It raises serious questions as to whether continued operation of the station is in the public interest."

== Chart history ==
The song peaked at No. 10 on the U.S. Billboard Hot 100 and No. 8 on Cash Box during the spring of 1971, and was the duo's only Top 40 hit. It also reached No. 5 in Canada and No. 7 in New Zealand.

=== Weekly charts ===
Chart (1971)	Peak position
Australia Kent Music Report Top Singles	40
Canada RPM Top Singles	5
New Zealand (Listener)	7
U.S. Billboard Hot 100	10
U.S. Cash Box Top 100	8

=== Year-end charts ===
Chart (1971)	Rank
Canada	70
U.S. Billboard Hot 100	63
U.S. Cash Box	72

== Cover versions ==
The song was performed in early 1971 by Gail Farrell and Dick Dale on The Lawrence Welk Show, which Brewer credited with giving the duo "more publicity than we could pay for." Welk described the song as a "modern spiritual" and later blamed his network ABC for forcing him to incorporate the song into the show, which would be a factor in his leaving the network that year.

== Later uses ==
The song is notably mentioned in the opening of Hunter S. Thompson's 1971 novel, Fear and Loathing in Las Vegas, and was "sung" by Dr. Gonzo (Benicio Del Toro) in the 1998 film adaptation.

== See also ==
- List of 1970s one-hit wonders in the United States
