= So Lonely (disambiguation) =

"So Lonely" is a 1978 song by The Police.

So Lonely may also refer to:

- "So Lonely" (The Superjesus song), 2004
- "So Lonely" (Twista song), 2006
- "So Lonely", a song by The Hollies from the 1965 album Hollies
- "So Lonely", a song by Loudness from the 1987 album Hurricane Eyes
- "So Lonely", a 2001 song by Jakatta & Monsoon, a remix of Monsoon's 1982 song "Ever So Lonely"
- "So Lonely", a 2004 song by The Bleeders
- So Lonely, a 2010 album by Heaven

== See also ==
- "Lonely", Akon song from 2005
