= Syndicate of Sound =

American garage rock band

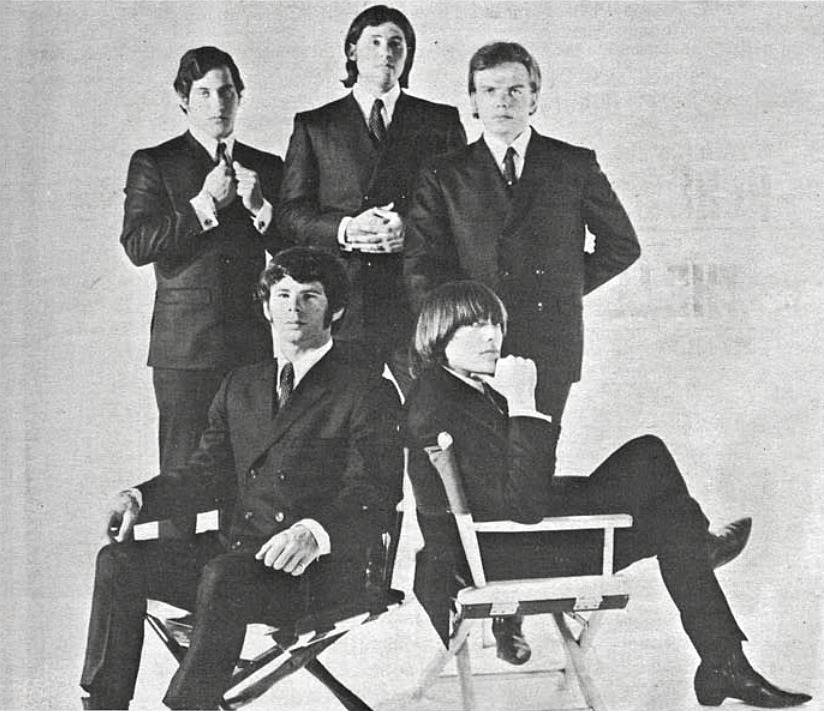
- Circa 1966. Clockwise from top left: Bob Gonzales, Don Baskin, John Duckworth, Jim Sawyers, John Sharkey

Background information
- Origin: San Jose, California, United States
- Genres: Garage rock, beat, rock and roll
- Years active: 1964–1970; 1990–2019
- Labels: Bell, Buddah, Sundazed Music
- Members: Bob Gonzalez; John Duckworth; Jim Sawyers
- Past members: Don Baskin; Larry Ray; John Sharkey; Carl Scott; Ned Torney
- Website: syndicateofsoundband.com

The Syndicate of Sound are an American garage rock band formed in San Jose, California, in 1964. Through their national hit "Little Girl", the band developed a raw sound, and became forerunners in the psychedelic rock genre. The group managed to produce two other charting singles and, after their initial breakup in 1970, have since reformed with a new lineup.

== History ==
The line-up formed in 1964, when Don Baskin (October 9, 1946 – October 22, 2019; vocalist, guitar) and Bob Gonzalez (bass guitar), both originally from the outfit Lenny Lee and the Nightmen, united with a local group called the Pharaohs. The resulting band, the Syndicate of Sound, which, along with Baskin and Gonzalez, included John Sharkey (keyboards), Larry Ray (lead guitar), and John Duckworth (drums). Several other stand-ins performed with the band, most notably Dr. Kelly E. Hejtmancik Sr. (bass guitar) of Galveston TX during the band's Galveston filming of "Little Girl". In the beginning stages of the band's existence, the group was influenced by R&B music, specifically the early musical styles of the Rolling Stones and the Beatles. After the group won a Bay Area "Battle of the Bands" against 100 other competing bands, the Syndicate of Sound earned a recording contract with Del-Fi Records. The band released the single "Prepare for Love", which received local airplay, but ultimately failed to make an impact. Though the record was unsuccessful, it established the band's sound, combining striking vocal harmonies and innovative psychedelic instrumentals.

Baskin, Gonzalez and Sharkey continued to write new material and came up with "Little Girl" and "You" which the band recorded for Hush Records in San Francisco, on January 9, 1966. "Little Girl" became a regional hit after San Jose radio station KLIV latched onto it. From there it attracted the attention of Bill Gavin's tip sheet and then executives at Bell Records in New York. Bell released it nationally and offered the group a contract for an album. Replacing Larry Ray with lead guitarist Jim Sawyers, they wrote and recorded the LP in three weeks. They then began a national tour appearing with other acts, including Paul Revere & the Raiders, the Young Rascals and the Yardbirds. "Little Girl" peaked at No. 8 on the Billboard Hot 100 on 9–16 July 1966 and No. 5 on Cashbox. The follow-up "Rumors" also hit the Hot 100 and peaked at No. 55 on 1 October 1966.

In an attempt to sustain their success, the band released two more singles, "Keep It Up" and "Mary", but none of them charted. By this time John Duckworth had been drafted into the U.S. Army for the Vietnam war and was replaced by Carl Scott on drums, and John Sharkey had left the group soon after "Mary" was released. Another single, "Brown Paper Bag" reached No. 73 on the Hot 100, on 25 April 1970. Afterward Baskin and Gonzalez made a failed attempt to record another album for Capitol Records in 1970. They disbanded shortly after.

In 1990, Baskin, Gonzalez and Duckworth reformed the band, adding Jim Sawyers on guitar, which performed occasionally. They recorded another non-charting single in 1995, a cover of a Kinks composition "Who Will be the Next in Line?". In 2005, Larry Ray rejoined the band.

In 2006, the Syndicate of Sound was in the first class of inductees into the San Jose Rocks Hall of Fame.

Don Baskin died on October 22, 2019, aged 73. John Duckworth's death was reported on August 29, 2022.

== Little Girl ==
"Little Girl" later was recorded by other artists, including Dwight Yoakam and the English punk group the Banned, an offshoot of prog-rock band Gryphon, which reached No. 36 in the UK charts in 1977. The American punk group the Dead Boys included a live version on their 1977 debut album Young, Loud and Snotty. "Hey Little Girl", renamed "Hey Little Boy", was also covered by Australian band Divinyls in 1988 on their Temperamental album. R.E.M. played the song as part of its early live sets. The San Francisco Bay Area band CHOC'D also covers the song in their live sets, featuring "Sexy Rexy" on vocals.

The song "Little Girl" was recognized by the Rock and Roll Hall of Fame Museum in Cleveland, Ohio since the day it was opened, where it is on permanent rotation in the one-hit Wonder section.

== Discography ==
=== Album ===
Year	Title	US Billboard 200	Label
1966	Little Girl	--	Bell LP6001

=== Singles ===
Year	Title	US Hot 100	US Cash Box	Label
1966	"Little Girl" "You"	8	5	Hush G-228, Bell 640
1966	"Rumors" "The Upper Hand"	55	--	Bell 646
1967	"Keep It Up" "Good Time Music"	--	--	Bell 655
1967	"That Kind of Man" "Mary"	--	--	Bell 666
1970	"Brown Paper Bag" "Reverb Beat"	73	--	Buddah Records BDA 156
1970	"Mexico" "First to Love You"	--	--	Buddah Records BDA 183
1995	"Who'll Be the Next in Line?" "The Spider & the Fly"	--	--	Sundazed Music S 116

Various artist compilation appearances (selective)
Release	Catalogue	Year	Track	Notes
Gary Stevens Presents 22 More Good Guy Goldies Volume II	Lost Nite Records LP-123	1966	"Little Girl"	LP
San Jose Todaze Yesterday	South Bay Records 4081	1996	"Shakin' All Over", "My Lonely Sad Eyes", "I Ain't Got You"	CD
The Hush Records Story	Big Beat Records CDWIKD 154	1997	"Little Girl", "Get Outta My Life", "Looking for the Good Times (The Robot)" "That Kind of Man", "Rumors", "Say I Love You" "Mary (Marrie)", "Games", "Saturday Night"	CD
