= Brewer & Shipley =

American folk rock duo

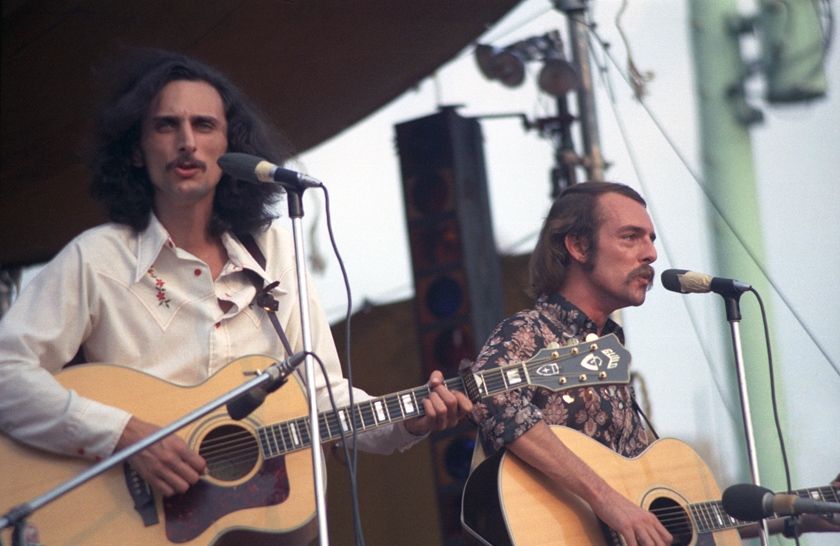
- Tom Shipley (left) and Mike Brewer in concert on Boston Common, 1971

Background information
- Origin: United States
- Genres: Folk rock, country rock
- Years active: 1967–1978, 1989, 1993–2021
- Labels: Kama Sutra, A&M, Capitol
- Members: Mike Brewer; Tom Shipley
- Website: brewerandshipley.com

Brewer & Shipley were an American folk rock duo who enjoyed their peak success in the late 1960s through the 1970s. The duo consisted of singer-songwriters Mike Brewer and Tom Shipley. They were known for their intricate guitar work, vocal harmonies, and socially conscious lyrics which reflected the concerns of their generation – especially the Vietnam War, and the struggles for personal and political freedom.

Their greatest commercial success was the song "One Toke Over the Line" from their 1970 album Tarkio. Their recording on this album of Ted Anderson's "Seems Like A Long Time" led to Rod Stewart's cover on his album Every Picture Tells A Story. They had two other singles on the Billboard charts: "Tarkio Road" (1970) and "Shake Off the Demon" (1971).

== Early history ==
After graduating with a degree in geology from Baldwin Wallace College in 1963, Tom Shipley started playing the coffeehouse circuit. In Kent, Ohio, he met the Oklahoman Michael Brewer. They formed a duo and moved to Los Angeles in 1968, where they were quite unhappy. The title of their first album, Down in L.A., reflected their disaffection. It featured their demos and was released without their consent. Their next album was titled Weeds. Even though mutual friends in bands such as The Association and Buffalo Springfield lived in Los Angeles, they left California during 1969, returning to Kansas City, Missouri, where they made a meager living playing college towns. They derived the name of their next album, Tarkio, from a regular gig they played in Tarkio, Missouri. This album was their most successful commercially, featuring the song "One Toke Over the Line", which they wrote as a joke while preparing backstage for a performance.

"One Toke Over The Line" was performed on The Lawrence Welk Show, a television program known for its conservative, family-oriented format, by Gail Farrell and Dick Dale. At the conclusion of the performance of the song, Welk remarked, without any hint of irony, "There you've heard a modern spiritual by Gail and Dale." This caused Brewer to comment:

The Vice President of the United States, Spiro Agnew, named us personally as a subversive to American youth, but at exactly the same time Lawrence Welk performed the crazy thing and introduced it as a gospel song. That shows how absurd it really is. Of course, we got more publicity than we could have paid for.

Brewer & Shipley performed with many notable acts, including Stephen Stills, Bruce Springsteen, Black Sabbath, and Jerry Garcia of the Grateful Dead, who played pedal steel guitar for "Oh, Mommy".

== Regrouping and later touring ==
During 1989 they performed a gig together, and a brief time later began composing together again, producing two albums, SHANGHAI (1993) and Heartland (1997). In 2011, the acoustic duo performed on Main Street in Tarkio, Missouri, to commemorate the 40th anniversary of the Tarkio album. One Toke Over the Line ... and Still Smokin', a documentary on Brewer and Shipley, was released on Vimeo on Demand on April 20, 2021. They continued to perform live until the COVID-19 pandemic in 2020.

Michael Brewer lived outside of Branson, Missouri, until his death on December 17, 2024, at the age of 80.

Tom Shipley lived in Rolla, Missouri, where he was part of the staff of Missouri University of Science & Technology (formerly the University of Missouri – Rolla). He was also a manager of video productions for the university. He was a member of Engineers Without Borders and traveled twice to the Amazon and Andes of Bolivia to produce videos for the organization. Shipley died on August 24, 2025, at the age of 84.

== Discography ==
=== Albums ===
- Down in L.A. (1968) on A&M Records
- Weeds (1969) on Kama Sutra Records
- Tarkio (1970) on Kama Sutra Records, US Billboard # 30, #35 CAN
- Shake Off the Demon (1971) on Kama Sutra Records, US Billboard # 164
- Rural Space (1972) on Kama Sutra Records, US Billboard # 174
- ST11261 (1974) on Capitol Records, US Billboard # 185
- Welcome To Riddle Bridge (1975) on Capitol Records, US Billboard # 202
- Brewer and Shipley Greatest Hits (1989) on Pair Records
- SHANGHAI (1993) on One Toke Productions
- Archive Alive! (1997) on Archive Recordings
- Heartland (1997) on One Toke Productions
- One Toke Over the Line: The Best of Brewer & Shipley (2001) on Buddah Records

=== EPs ===
- Kama Sutra Records LP Sampler, 1970

=== Singles ===
- "Keeper of the Keys" / "I Can't See Her" (A&M 905, 1968)
- "Truly Right" / "Green Bamboo" (A&M 938, 1968)
- "Time and Changes" / "Dreamin' in the Shade" (A&M 996, 1968)
- "Rise Up Easy Rider" / "Boomerang" (Buddah 154, 1969)
- "People Love Each Other" / "Witchi-Tai-To" (Kama Sutra 512, 1970)
- "One Toke Over the Line" / "Oh Mommy" (Kama Sutra 516, 1971), US Billboard # 10, US Cash Box # 8, Canada # 5
- "Tarkio Road" / "Seems Like A Long Time" (Kama Sutra 524, 1971), US Billboard # 55, US Cash Box # 39, Canada # 41
- "Shake Off the Demon" / "Indian Summer" (Kama Sutra 539, 1972), US Billboard # 98
- "Yankee Lady" / "Natural Child" (Kama Sutra 547, 1972), US Cash Box # 90
- "Black Sky" (mono) / "Black Sky" (stereo) (Kama Sutra 567 promo, 1973)
- "Fair Play" (mono) / "Fair Play" (stereo) (Capitol 3933 promo, 1974)
- "Brain Damage" (mono) / "Brain Damage" (stereo) (Capitol 4105 promo, 1975)
- "Stop the Merrimack Dam" / "Carry Me Down" (Rose Bridge Records RB-01, c.1976)

Reissue singles

- "One Toke Over the Line" / "Oh Mommy" (Flashback BF10)
- "One Toke Over the Line" / "Tarkio Road" (Collectables 3515)
- "People Love Each Other" / "Witchi-Tai-To" (Radio Active Gold RD-74, 1978)
- "One Toke Over the Line" / "Oh Mommy" (Radio Active Gold RD-75 1978)
- "Indian Summer" / "Song from Platte River" (Radio Active Gold RD-77, 1978)

== In popular culture ==
- In the first chapter of Hunter S. Thompson's novel Fear and Loathing in Las Vegas, Raoul Duke's attorney, Dr. Gonzo, sings the line "One toke over the line, sweet Jesus, one toke over the line" while the two of them drive from Barstow to Las Vegas.
- One Toke Over the Line is an addiction status in the video game Grand Theft Auto IV.
- Shipley, a cat featured in Tom Cox's memoir Under the Paw: Confessions of a Cat Man, is named after Tom Shipley.
- In the movie St. Vincent (2014) the song "One Toke Over the Line" is heard playing on Bill Murray's headphones and is listed on the soundtrack credits.

== See also ==
- List of 1970s one-hit wonders in the United States
