= Leo De Gar Kulka =

American record producer and engineer (1921–1998)

- Born: February 17, 1921; Brno, Czechoslovakia
- Died: March 17, 1998 (aged 77)
- Occupations: Record producer Recording engineer

Leo De Gar Kulka (February 17, 1921 – March 17, 1998) was a Czech-born American record producer, recording engineer and educator. Starting in Los Angeles at Autumn Records in the 1960s, he later founded the San Francisco studio Golden State Recorders, trade school College for Recording Arts and audiophile record label Sonic Arts. Kulka is considered a pioneer in the modern recording industry.

== History ==
Leo de Gar Kulka was born in 1921 in Brno, Czechoslovakia. After studying engineering, Kulka moved to Los Angeles in 1938. During World War II and Korean War, he served in the U.S. Army Counterintelligence Corps (CIC), retiring with the rank of major. Kulka's wartime experiences with wire recorders and radio transmission sparked a lifelong passion for recording and music. In the early 1950s he became a staff engineer at Radio Recorders at 6000 Santa Monica Blvd, Hollywood. Kulka was known by recording industry friends as "The Baron".

In 1957 he founded International Sound, one of the first multitrack facilities in Hollywood. The studio, located on Sunset at Western, later became Sunwest. His Neumann mastering room was the first in the city to feature a stereo cutting head. At International Sound, Kulka recorded artists including Herb Alpert, Nat King Cole, Sam Cooke, Frank Sinatra, Sonny Bono and Little Richard.

In 1964 Kulka moved to San Francisco and founded Golden State Recorders, one of the largest recording studios in northern California. With a Stephens 16-track recorder and a custom multitrack console, he contributed to the "San Francisco Sound", by recording artists Sly & The Family Stone, Grace Slick, Janis Joplin and Michael Bloomfield.

During that period, Kulka was working for Autumn Records recording bands. Partnering with Sylvester Stewart, the leader of Sly & The Family Stone, Kulka arranged an early recording for the group, resulting in a single on the Lodestone label, "I Ain't Got Nobody" / "I Can't Turn You Loose". He and Stewart also collaborated on recordings by The Great Society for which both were the original session producers.

For over 10 years Kulka lectured in Audio at San Francisco State University. In 1974 he founded the College for Recording Arts, dedicated to training aspiring music industry employees in all aspects of the industry. CRA is thought to be the first American school to provide unified business and technical education for the recording industry. Having attracted students from the North America, Asia and Latin America., some graduates of the school became successful engineers, producers and studio owners. In 1994 he closed the College for Recording Arts, instead devoting his time to analog and digital mastering, and the restoration of vintage sound recordings.

Kulka was the founder of the San Francisco Chapter of the National Academy of Recording Arts and Sciences (NARAS) and served as chairman for three terms. He headed the NARAS Institute, the educational arm of the society for an additional two years. As a member of the Audio Engineering Society since 1959, he first served in Los Angeles, and then as chairman of the San Francisco Section for multiple terms.

Kulka was elected to the AES board of Governors from 1989/1990 and 1992/1993 to 1993/1994. He was chairman of the 93rd Convention that was held over October from the 1st to 4th San Francisco in 1992. In 1993 Kulka was elected treasurer and chairman of the Finance Committee.

The Neumann disk mastering room at Golden State was Kulka's pride and joy. In the 1970s and 1980, he continued to innovate, using the room to master multiple "direct to disk" audiophile recordings, as well as binaural stereo recordings for the Sonic Arts label.

== Awards ==
For his AES chairmanship he received a Board of Governors Award. In 1995 he was awarded with an AES Fellowship Award for his contributions to education and sound recording practices.

== Death ==
Leo De Gar Kulka died on March 17, 1998, aged 77. He was survived by his wife, Pat, and daughters Lilly and Clara.

== Recordings ==
=== Compilations ===
- Afterglow, Afterglow, 1968
- Armageddon, The Maze, 1969
- Birth Of The Dead, Grateful Dead, 2003
- Born To Be Burned, The Great Society, 1995
- Brazilian Tapestry, George Muribus, 1976
- Casting Pearls, Mill Valley Bunch, 1972
- Compilations of music recorded at Golden State Recording 1966-1973
- Crystallize Your Mind, Various Artists, 1994
- Feel...The Vejtables, The Vejtables, 1995
- Gold, Gold, 1996
- Golden State Funk: Impossibly Rare Funk From The Bay Area, Various Artists, 2000
- Golden State Soul: San Franciscan Dancers & Smoochers, Various Artists, 2000
- Good Things Are Happening, Various Artists, 1994
- Happy Trails, Quicksilver Messenger Service, 1969
- Introducing, The Beau Brummels, 1965
- Introducing, The E-Types, 1995
- Listen To The Voices: Sly Stone In The Studio 1965–70, Various Artists, 2000
- Little Girl, Syndicate Of Sound, 1966
- Long Years In Space, The Neighb'rhood Childr'n, 1997
- Loosen Up Naturally, The Sons of Champlin, 1969
- Mad River, Mad River, 1968
- No Matter What You Say: The Best of, Butch Engle & the Styx, 2000
- One Stormy Night, The Mystic Moods Orchestra, 1966
- Paradise Bar & Grill, Mad River, 1969
- San Fran Sessions, The Beau Brummels, 1996
- Steelyard Blues, Gravenites/Bloomfield and others, 1972
- The Amazing Charlatans, The Charlatans, 1996
- The Love Exchange, The Love Exchange, 1968
- The Mourning Reign, The Mourning Reign, 1998
- The Neighb'rhood Childr'n, The Neighb'rhood Childr'n, 1968
- Weeds, Brewer & Shipley, 1970
- What A Way to Come Down, Various Artists, 1997
- You Got Yours! East Bay Garage 1965–1967, Various Artists, 2007

=== Singles ===
- Leo And Flora De Gar Kulka – "A Merry Christmas And A Happy New Year" - Golden State Records – M-1967 (single-sided 33 ⅓ RPM single)
- Millie Foster - Millie Foster Feels the Spirit - MGM SE 4897 - 1970
  The album featured Michael Bloomfield on guitar.

=== CDs ===
- Sly & The Family Stone - Slyfest Freshest Funkiest Rarest Cuts - Magical Mystery Compact Disc MMCD-00002 - 1995
  Album consists of 4 tracks that Sly & The Family Stone cut in 1966 for Kulka's Golden State Recorders Studio.
  The tracks consisted of "Can't Turn You Loose," "I Ain't Got Nobody," "Take My Advice," and "Life of Fortune and Fame." There were also 20 outtakes. Michael Briggs was the co-producer.
- Andre Previn & Los Angeles Philharmonic Orchestra - PROKOFIEV: Alexander Nevsky, Lieutenant Kijé - Telarc CD-80143
- Stephen Kates, Carolyn Pope Kobler - PROKOFIEV: Rachmaninoff: Sonata in G-minor, Op. 19 for Cello and Piano - Bainbridge BCD-6272
- Jeremy Menuhin - Mozart: Piano Concerto No 13, Lucio Silla Overture (Conducted by George Cleve) - Bainbridge BCD-6273
- Tibor Szasz - Beethoven: Sonata No.32, Op.111; Sonata No.21, Op.53 - Bainbridge BCD-6275
