= Mike Brewer (musician) =

American singer-songwriter (1944–2024)

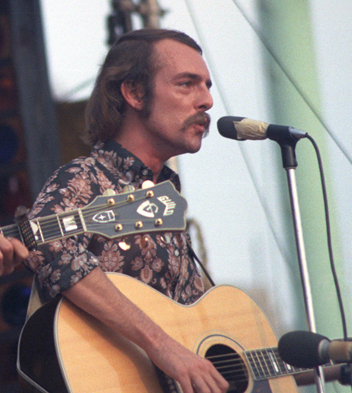
- Brewer in 1971

Background information
- Birth name: Charles Michael Brewer
- Born: April 14, 1944; Oklahoma City, U.S.
- Died: December 17, 2024 (aged 80) near Branson, Missouri, U.S.
- Occupation: Musician
- Formerly of: Brewer & Shipley

Charles Michael Brewer (April 14, 1944 – December 17, 2024) was an American singer-songwriter. He and Tom Shipley were the music duo Brewer & Shipley.

Brewer formed a duo in Los Angeles during early 1966 named Mastin & Brewer with singer/songwriter Tom Mastin. The group recruited drummer Billy Mundi and bass guitar player Jim Fielder for live performances, opening for The Byrds and Buffalo Springfield during spring 1966. When Mastin left during sessions for an album, Brewer enlisted his brother Keith and the pair recorded a lone single 45 for Columbia Records, "Need You", backed by "Rainbow" (written by Tom Mastin and Brewer before the former's departure). Mundi became employed with The Lamp of Childhood and then The Mothers of Invention while Fielder had also joined The Mothers of Invention (and later Buffalo Springfield and Blood, Sweat & Tears). After recording the single, Brewer met his old friend Tom Shipley and they initiated a duo together.

Their third album, 1970's Tarkio, included the song "One Toke Over the Line," which became an unlikely pop hit in 1971, reaching #10 on the Hot 100.

During 1983, Brewer released an LP, Beauty Lies, of which Dan Fogelberg was the producer. The album has never been released on CD.

Brewer died at his home near Branson, Missouri, on December 17, 2024, at the age of 80.
