= Lynn Anderson albums discography =

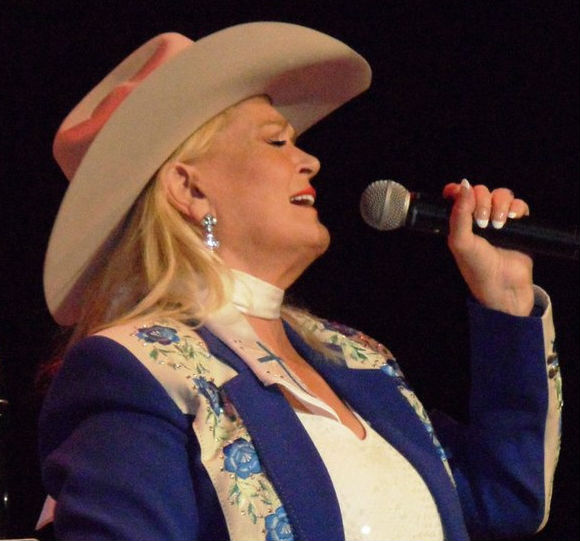
- Lynn Anderson in concert, 2011.
- Studio albums: 37
- EPs: 3
- Live albums: 2
- Compilation albums: 20
- Video albums: 2

The albums discography of American country music artist Lynn Anderson contains 37 studio albums, 21 compilation albums, two live albums, two video albums and three extended plays. She signed her first recording contract in 1966 with Chart Records. The following year, her debut studio album entitled Ride, Ride, Ride was released on the label. It was her first album to debut on the Billboard Top Country Albums chart, peaking at number 25. Her second studio effort, Promises, Promises, was issued in December 1967 and spent 48 weeks on the country albums chart before peaking at number one. The Chart label issued four more studio albums by Anderson until 1970. This included 1969's Songs That Made Country Girls Famous, which was a tribute to female country artists.

Anderson had a major crossover pop hit with "Rose Garden" after signing with Columbia Records in 1970. "Rose Garden"'s major success led to her eleventh studio album of the same name in December 1970. The album spent 77 weeks on the Billboard Top Country Albums chart before peaking at number one. It was her highest-charting album on the Billboard 200 as well, where it reached number 19. Rose Garden became Anderson's highest-charting and biggest-selling album. It later certify platinum in sales from the Recording Industry Association of America and held the record for the longest weeks spent at number one for 24 years. The record was broken in 1995 by Shania Twain with The Woman in Me. Anderson's eleventh studio album, You're My Man (1971), was her third to top the Billboard country albums survey. It was followed by a series of studio albums that reached the Billboard country top ten. This included How Can I Unlove You (1971), Cry (1972) and Keep Me in Mind (1973). The Columbia label issued studio albums by Anderson through the rest of the 1970s. As her singles became less successful, her albums did as well. Her final Columbia release was Even Cowgirls Get the Blues (1980), which only reached number 37.

Anderson returned with 1983's Back after a three-year hiatus. The album was her final to reach the Billboard country albums chart, peaking at number 61 in October 1983. She continued to record during the remainder of the decade, releasing 1988's What She Does Best on Mercury Records. She returned in 1992 with the western album, Cowboy's Sweetheart. In 1999, her first live record was issued entitled Live at Billy Bob's Texas. Her 2005 studio release, The Bluegrass Sessions, was nominated for Best Bluegrass Album at the Grammy Awards. Shortly before her death in 2015, Anderson released the gospel project, Bridges.

== Studio albums ==
List of albums, with selected chart positions and certifications, showing other relevant details
Title	Album details	Peak chart positions			Certifications
Title	Album details	US	US Cou.	CAN	Certifications
Ride, Ride, Ride	Released: March 1967; Label: Chart; Formats: LP, 8 track	—	25	—	
Promises, Promises	Released: December 1967; Label: Chart; Formats: LP, 8 track, cassette	—	1	—	
Big Girls Don't Cry	Released: July 1968; Label: Chart; Formats: LP, 8 track	—	11	—	
With Love, from Lynn	Released: March 1969; Label: Chart; Formats: LP, 8 track, cassette	197	22	—	
At Home with Lynn	Released: July 1969; Label: Chart; Formats: LP, 8 track, cassette	—	19	—	
Songs That Made Country Girls Famous	Released: November 1969; Label: Chart; Formats: LP, 8 track, cassette	—	9	—	
Uptown Country Girl	Released: February 1970; Label: Chart; Formats: LP, 8 track, cassette	—	29	—	
Stay There 'Til I Get There	Released: May 1970; Label: Columbia; Formats: LP, 8 track, cassette (1982 reissue)	—	28	—	
No Love at All	Released: August 1970; Label: Columbia; Formats: LP, 8 track	—	22	—	
I'm Alright	Released: September 1970; Label: Chart; Formats: LP, 8 track tape, cassette	—	33	—	
Rose Garden	Released: December 1970; Label: Columbia; Formats: LP, 8 track tape, cassette	19	1	5	MC: Platinum; RIAA: Platinum
You're My Man	Released: July 1971; Label: Columbia; Formats: LP, 8 track tape, cassette	99	1	—	
How Can I Unlove You	Released: October 1971; Label: Columbia; Formats: LP, 8 track tape, cassette	132	2	—	
The Christmas Album	Released: November 1971; Label: Columbia; Formats: LP, 8 track tape	13	—	—	
Cry	Released: March 1972; Label: Columbia; Formats: LP, 8 track tape, cassette	114	2	—	
Listen to a Country Song	Released: July 1972; Label: Columbia; Formats: LP, 8 track tape, cassette	160	3	—	
Keep Me in Mind	Released: January 1973; Label: Columbia; Formats: LP, 8 track tape, cassette	201	2	—	
Top of the World	Released: June 1973; Label: Columbia; Formats: LP, 8 track tape, cassette	179	7	—	
Smile for Me	Released: March 1974; Label: Columbia; Formats: LP, 8 track, cassette	—	14	—	
What a Man My Man Is	Released: November 1974; Label: Columbia; Formats: LP, 8 track, cassette	—	18	—	
I've Never Loved Anyone More	Released: August 1975; Label: Columbia; Formats: LP, 8 track	—	20	—	
All the King's Horses	Released: March 1976; Label: Columbia; Formats: LP, 8 track, cassette	—	20	—	
Wrap Your Love All Around Your Man	Released: March 1977; Label: Columbia; Formats: LP, 8 track, cassette	—	28	—	
I Love What Love Is Doing to Me/ He Ain't You	Released: August 1977; Label: Columbia; Formats: LP, 8 track, cassette	—	38	—	
From the Inside	Released: September 1978; Label: Columbia; Formats: LP, 8 track, cassette	—	—	—	
Outlaw Is Just a State of Mind	Released: March 1979; Label: Columbia; Formats: LP, 8 track, cassette	—	29	—	
Even Cowgirls Get the Blues	Released: July 1980; Label: Columbia; Formats: LP, 8 track, cassette	—	37	—	
The Best of Lynn Anderson: Memories and Desires	Released: 1982; Label: Era/K-tel; Formats: LP, 8 track, cassette	—	—	—	
Back	Released: July 1983; Label: Permian; Formats: LP, cassette	—	61	—	
What She Does Best	Released: 1988; Label: Mercury; Formats: LP, cassette, CD	—	—	—	
Cowboy's Sweetheart	Released: June 1992; Label: Laserlight; Formats: Cassette, CD	—	—	—	
Latest and Greatest (re-recordings)	Released: March 31, 1998; Label: Platinum; Formats: Cassette, CD	—	—	—	
Home for the Holidays	Released: December 11, 1999; Label: Smith; Formats: CD	—	—	—	
The Bluegrass Sessions	Released: June 28, 2005; Label: DM; Formats: CD, music download	—	—	—	
Cowgirl	Released: September 20, 2006; Label: Showboat; Formats: CD, music download	—	—	—	
Cowgirl II	Released: January 28, 2010; Label: Showboat; Formats: CD, music download	—	—	—	
Bridges	Released: June 5, 2015; Label: Center Sound; Formats: CD, music download	—	—	—	
"—" denotes a recording that did not chart or was not released in that territory.

== Compilation albums ==
List of albums, with selected chart positions and certifications, showing other relevant details
Title	Album details	Peak chart positions		Certifications
Title	Album details	US	US Cou.	Certifications
The Best of Lynn Anderson	Released: December 1968; Label: Chart; Formats: LP, 8 track, cassette	180	29	
Lynn Anderson	Released: 1970; Label: Mountain Dew; Formats: LP, 8 track	—	—	
Songs My Mother Wrote (Lynn Anderson Sings Liz Anderson)	Released: June 1970; Label: Chart; Formats: LP, 8 track	—	—	
Lynn Anderson's Greatest Hits, Vol. 1	Released: January 1971; Label: Chart; Formats: LP, 8 track, cassette	—	40	
Lynn Anderson with Strings	Released: February 1971; Label: Chart; Formats: LP, 8 track, cassette	—	—	
The World of Lynn Anderson	Released: August 1971; Label: Columbia; Formats: LP, 8 track, cassette	174	13	
Lynn Anderson	Released: October 1971; Label: Chart; Formats: LP	—	—	
Lynn Anderson's Greatest Hits	Released: August 1972; Label: Columbia; Formats: LP, 8 track, cassette	129	3	RIAA: Gold
Flower of Love	Released: November 1973; Label: Pickwick; Formats: LP, 8 track	—	—	
It Makes You Happy	Released: 1974; Label: Pickwick; Formats: LP, 8 track, cassette	—	—	
Lynn Anderson's Greatest Hits, Volume II	Released: September 1976; Label: Columbia; Formats: LP, 8 track, cassette	—	41	
Encore	Released: June 1981; Label: Columbia; Formats: LP, 8 track, cassette	—	—	
Country Classics: Lynn Anderson	Released: 1983; Label: CBS Special Products; Formats: LP	—	—	
The Best of Lynn Anderson	Released: 1996; Label: Hallmark; Formats: Cassette, CD	—	—	
Pure Country: Lynn Anderson	Released: August 25, 1998; Label: Sony Music Entertainment; Formats: Compact disc	—	—	
Anthology: The Columbia Years	Released: September 14, 1999; Label: Renaissance; Formats: CD	—	—	
Anthology: The Chart Years	Released: September 28, 1999; Label: Renaissance; Formats: CD	—	—	
Greatest Hits	Released: January 4, 2005; Label: Collectors' Choice; Formats: CD, music download	—	—	
16 Biggest Hits	Released: April 11, 2006; Label: Columbia/Legacy; Formats: CD, music download	—	—	
Country: Lynn Anderson	Released: November 27, 2012; Label: Columbia/Legacy; Formats: CD	—	—	
The Essential Lynn Anderson	Released: April 1, 2014; Label: Columbia Nashville/Legacy; Formats: CD, music download	—	—	
"—" denotes a recording that did not chart or was not released in that territory.

== Live albums ==
List of albums, showing relevant details
Title	Album details
Live at Billy Bob's Texas	Released: May 30, 1999; Label: Smith; Format: CD
Live from the Rose Garden	Released: March 29, 2005; Label: Cleopatra; Formats: CD, DVD

== Video albums ==
List of albums, showing relevant details
Title	Album details
Live at the Renaissance Center	Released: November 15, 2005; Label: Weinerworld; Formats: CD, DVD
Lynn Anderson in Concert: Cry and Other Classics	Released: October 17, 2006; Label: Immortal; Formats: DVD

== Extended plays ==
List of albums, showing relevant details
Title	Album details
The Best of Lynn Anderson	Released: 1969; Label: Chart; Formats: EP
Uptown Country Girl	Released: 1970; Label: Chart; Formats: EP
Rose Garden	Released: 1973; Label: CBS; Formats: EP
