= Latest and Greatest =

Studio album (re-recording) by Lynn Anderson
- Released: March 31, 1998
- Genre: Country; country pop
- Length: 33:05
- Label: Platinum
- Producer: Michael Clark

Lynn Anderson chronology
Cowboy's Sweetheart (1992)	Latest and Greatest (1998)	Home for the Holidays (1999)

Latest and Greatest is a studio album by American country artist Lynn Anderson. It was released on March 31, 1998, via Platinum Entertainment and was produced by Michael Clark. The album was Anderson's 32nd studio release in her music career and first for the Platinum label. The 11-track collection contained a mixture of re-recordings and new songs.

== Background, release and reception ==
Latest and Greatest was produced by Michael Clark. It was Anderson's third album produced by Clark, who had first worked with her on the 1983 studio album Back. The project was a collection of 11 tracks. Eight of the album's tracks were re-recordings of Anderson biggest hits. These hits included "Rose Garden," "You're My Man," "Cry" and "Rocky Top." Three of the album's songs were new compositions. The tracks were included at the end of the track listing. All three of the song recordings were composed by Mentor Williams, Anderson's domestic partner.

The Latest and Greatest was released on Platinum Entertainment on March 31, 1998. It was Anderson's 32nd studio recording in her career and only her second studio effort of the decade. The album was offered as a compact disc and an audio cassette. It was later released to digital retailers. Latest and Greatest was reviewed positively by Allmusic in their original review of the album. Reviewers took note of the maturity in Anderson's voice since her early hits, comparing it to that of Mary Chapin Carpenter and K.T. Oslin. "Many of these re-recorded hits benefit from Anderson's slightly darker vocals; the contemporary production here makes the originals sound vaguely quaint," writers commented.

== Track listing ==
=== CD and digital versions ===
Latest and Greatest (1998)
No.	Title	Writer(s)	Length
1.	"Top of the World"	John Bettis; Richard Carpenter	2:58
2.	"How Can I Unlove You"	Joe South	2:56
3.	"Rose Garden"	South	3:14
4.	"You're My Man"	Glenn Sutton	2:36
5.	"Cry"	Churchill Kohlman	3:10
6.	"Big Girls Don't Cry"	Liz Anderson	2:50
7.	"Keep Me in Mind"	George Richey; Sutton	2:54
8.	"Rocky Top"	Felice and Boudleaux Bryant	2:18
9.	"Time Alone"	Bettis; Michael Clark	3:51
10.	"Give It Up"	Carmen Acciaioli; Mentor Williams	3:44
11.	"What Fools Say"	Acciaioli; Moore; Williams	3:44

== Personnel ==
All credits are adapted from Allmusic.

Musical personnel

- Lynn Anderson – lead vocals
- Brian Barnett – drums
- Dennis Belfield – bass
- J.T. Corenflos – electric guitar
- Tom Flora – background vocals
- Doyle Grisham – steel guitar
- Steve Hill – background vocals
- Michael Noble – acoustic guitar, banjo, hi string guitar, mandola
- Judy Rodman – background vocals
- Buddy Skipper – piano

Technical personnel

- Brian Barnett – percussion
- Valerie Behling – art production, design
- Tom Bevins – photography
- Michael Clark – producer
- Jim Dineen – engineering
- Conni Treantfeles – art direction, design

== Release history ==
Region	Date	Format	Label	Ref.
United States	1998	Cassette	Platinum Entertainment	
United States	1998	Compact disc	Platinum Entertainment	
United States	2010s	Music download	Yell Records	
