= The Best of Lynn Anderson: Memories and Desires =

Studio album (re-recording) by Lynn Anderson
- Released: 1982
- Genre: Country
- Labels: Era; K-tel

Lynn Anderson chronology
Encore (1981)	The Best of Lynn Anderson: Memories and Desires (1982)	Back (1983)

Singles from The Best of Lynn Anderson: Memories and Desires
- 1. "Midnight Train to Georgia" Released: 1982

The Best of Lynn Anderson: Memories and Desires is a studio album by American country artist Lynn Anderson. It was released in 1982 via Era Records and internationally, the album was released on the K-tel distribution company. Although labeled as "The Best of," the album was actually a studio release containing re-recordings of several Anderson hit songs as well as a large number of cover versions of other singer's hits, some of which Anderson had earlier covered on albums and some she recorded for the first time here. Tracks from these sessions have been licensed and reissued on multiple later tape and CD releases over the decades.

== Background and content ==
Anderson recorded Memories and Desires for the K-tel company, a label that produced re-recorded music for veteran artists and performers. This music was also occasionally marked on television. The Best of Lynn Anderson: Memories and Desires was recorded in 1982 in Nashville, Tennessee. The album was a collection of 16 tracks, ten of which were re-recordings of Anderson's biggest hits. This included "Rose Garden," "Top of the World," "You're My Man" and "Cry." In addition, six tracks were new recordings to Anderson's discography. These songs were cover versions of songs first made famous by other music artists. Covers included two songs by The Carpenters, Dusty Springfield's "You Don't Have to Say You Love Me" and Gladys Knight & the Pips's "Midnight Train to Georgia."

== Release and controversy ==
The Best of Lynn Anderson: Memories and Desires was released in 1982 via Era Records, a subdivision of the K-Tel distributing company. It was released as a vinyl LP, containing eight songs on each side of the record. In Canada, the album was issued as an audio cassette, containing the same track format for each side of the tape.

The record did not place on Billboard on the Top Country Albums chart. Anderson's cover of "Midnight Train to Georgia" was the only single spawned from the project. Anderson objected to the original release of the single and took legal action to stop the promotion of the song. A settlement was eventually reached in December 1982 that called for no other singles to be released from the package.

== Track listing ==
Side one (Vinyl and cassette versions)
No.	Title	Writer(s)	Original music artist	Length
1.	"Midnight Train to Georgia"	Jim Weatherly	Gladys Knight & the Pips
2.	"Rose Garden"	Joe South	Billy Joe Royal (Note: "Rose Garden" was later recorded and made a number one country hit and top five pop hit by Lynn Anderson)
3.	"What a Man My Man Is"	Glenn Sutton	Lynn Anderson
4.	"Silver Threads and Golden Needles"	Dick Reynolds; Jack Rhodes	Wanda Jackson
5.	"How Can I Unlove You"	South	Lynn Anderson
6.	"We've Only Just Begun"	Roger Nichols; Paul Williams	The Carpenters
7.	"You're My Man"	Sutton	Lynn Anderson
8.	"It Must Be Love This Time"	Weatherly	Jim Weatherly

Side two (Vinyl and cassette versions)
No.	Title	Writer(s)	Original music artist	Length
1.	"You Don't Have to Say You Love Me"	Pino Donaggio; Simon Napier-Bell; Vito Pallavicini; Vicki Wickham	Dusty Springfield
2.	"Ride, Ride, Ride"	Liz Anderson	Lynn Anderson
3.	"Listen to a Country Song"	Al Garth; Jim Messina	Loggins and Messina (Note: "Listen to a Country Song" was later recorded and made a top ten country hit by Lynn Anderson)
4.	"Close to You"	Burt Bacharach; Hal David	The Carpenters
5.	"Cry"	Churchill Kohlman	Johnnie Ray (Note: "Cry" was later recorded and made a top five country hit by Lynn Anderson)
6.	"Fool Me"	Joe South	Joe South (Note: "Fool Me" was later recorded and made a top five country hit by Lynn Anderson)
7.	"Top of the World"	John Bettis; Richard Carpenter	The Carpenters (Note: "Top of the World" was later recorded and made a top five country hit by Lynn Anderson)
8.	"Keep Me in Mind"	George Richey; Sutton	Lynn Anderson

== Personnel ==
All credits are adapted from the vinyl insert information of the original album.

- Lynn Anderson – lead vocals

== Release history ==
Region	Date	Format	Label	Ref.
Canada	1982	Cassette	K-tel	
Ireland	1982	Vinyl	K-tel International	
United States	1982	Vinyl	Era Records	
