= Lynn Anderson's Greatest Hits =

Greatest hits album by Lynn Anderson
- Released: August 1972
- Recorded: 1970–1972
- Genre: Country; Countrypolitan
- Label: Columbia
- Producer: Glenn Sutton

Lynn Anderson chronology
Listen to a Country Song (1972)	Lynn Anderson's Greatest Hits (1972)	Keep Me in Mind (1973)

Lynn Anderson's Greatest Hits is a compilation album by American country artist Lynn Anderson. It was released in August 1972 via Columbia Records and was produced by Glenn Sutton. It was Anderson's eighth compilation released during her recording career and second for the Columbia label. Eleven tracks were chosen for the collection, all of which were previously hits. The album charted on major record publications at the time of its release and later certified for major sales.

== Background and content ==
Lynn Anderson's Greatest Hits was her first greatest hits package released on the Columbia label. The album was issued following the major success she had at the label with the single "Rose Garden." Further top ten hits followed after its success, which accounted for the release. The album included hits recorded between 1970 and 1972 in sessions produced by Glenn Sutton. At the time, Anderson and Sutton were also married. A total of eleven tracks were included on the package. The album opens with "Rose Garden," followed by the number one hits "You're My Man" and "How Can I Unlove You." Additional top ten hits Anderson had for Columbia are also included such as "Stay There, Till I Get There" and "Cry." Four additional album cuts are included on the album, such as "Nothing Between Us." The song was composed by Anderson and featured on her 1970 studio album, Rose Garden.

== Release and reception ==
Professional ratings
Review scores
Source	Rating
Allmusic	4.5/5 stars
Billboard	Favorable

Lynn Anderson's Greatest Hits was originally released in August 1972 via Columbia Records. It was Anderson's eighth compilation released in her career and only her second to be issued through Columbia. The album was issued as a vinyl LP, containing six songs on side one and five songs on side two of the record. The album spent a total of 29 weeks on the Billboard Top Country Albums chart before reaching number three in January 1973. In addition, the record also spent 14 weeks on the Billboard 200 and reached number 129 in December 1972. Three decades following its release, Lynn Anderson's Greatest Hits was certified gold in sales from the Recording Industry Association of America for selling over 500,000 copies in the United States. It was one of only two albums by Anderson officially certified from the RIAA.

The album also received positive reception from critics and publications. Following its release, Billboard magazine gave the record a positive response. Writers praised the album's variety of material that ranged from country to pop stylings. "Set serves as a fine introduction to the artist as a well as a collection for her fans," they concluded. In later years, Mark A. Humphrey of Allmusic gave the package 4.5 out of 5 stars. He called the album "big pipes, big production, and big hits" in his review.

== Track listing ==
Side one
No.	Title	Writer(s)	Length
1.	"Rose Garden"	Joe South	2:52
2.	"Cry"	Churchill Kohlman	3:08
3.	"How Can I Unlove You"	South	2:47
4.	"Stay There 'Til I Get There"	Glenn Sutton	2:08
5.	"That's What Lovin' You Has Meant to Me"	Sutton	2:37
6.	"Listen to a Country Song"	Al Garth; Jim Messina	2:43

Side two
No.	Title	Writer(s)	Length
1.	"You're My Man"	Sutton	2:36
2.	"No Love at All"	Johnny Christopher; Wayne C. Thompson	2:48
3.	"Don't Say Things You Don't Mean"	Sutton	2:08
4.	"I'm Gonna Write a Song"	Sutton	2:10
5.	"Nothing Between Us"	Lynn Anderson	2:49

== Personnel ==
All credits are adapted from the liner notes of Lynn Anderson's Greatest Hits.

Musical and technical personnel

- Lynn Anderson – lead vocals
- Lou Bradley – engineering
- Charlie Bragg – engineering
- Cam Mullins – arrangement
- Glenn Sutton – producer

== Charts ==
=== Weekly charts ===
Chart (1972–1973)	Peak position
US Billboard 200	129
US Top Country Albums (Billboard)	3

=== Year-end charts ===
Chart (1973)	Position
US Top Country Albums (Billboard)	27

== Certifications ==
Region	Certification	Certified units/sales
United States (RIAA)	Gold	500,000^{^}
^{^} Shipments figures based on certification alone.

== Release history ==
Region	Date	Format	Label	Ref.
Canada	August 1972	Vinyl	Columbia Records	
United States	August 1972	Vinyl	Columbia Records	
