= The World of Lynn Anderson =

Compilation album by Lynn Anderson
- Released: 1971
- Recorded: 1971
- Genre: Countrypolitan
- Label: Columbia
- Producers: Glenn Sutton, Clive Davis

Lynn Anderson chronology
The Christmas Album (1971)	The World of Lynn Anderson (1971)	Cry (1972)

Professional ratings
Review scores
Source	Rating
Allmusic	3/5 stars

The World of Lynn Anderson is a compilation album by country music singer Lynn Anderson released in 1971.

The World of Lynn Anderson seems to be an attempt to quickly package a volume in Columbia's two-disc "World of" series for Anderson, then at the peak of her career with three consecutive number one singles and multiple awards for her smash single "Rose Garden". Though Anderson had only been with the label for less than two years, she had already recorded five albums, three of which had charted well. The World of Lynn Anderson was a combination of the tracks from her first two albums for Columbia, Stay There 'Til I Get There and No Love at All, minus two tracks from the latter album, "It's My Time" and "I Found You Just in Time".

Many songs on this album are covers of previous hits for other artists, including Conway Twitty's "Hello Darlin'" and Bobbie Gentry's "Fancy" (which would later be covered by Reba McEntire and made a Top 10 Country hit for her in the 1990s). Several tracks were written by Glenn Sutton, Anderson's then-husband and record producer. A number of the tracks were also written by her mother, Liz Anderson whose 1970 hits "Husband Hunting" and "All Day Sucker" are among the cover performances. The album reached No. 13 on the "Top Country Albums" list (higher than the original albums had charted) and No. 174 on the "Billboard 200" in 1971.

== Track listing ==
1. "No Love At All" (Johnny Christopher, Wayne Carson Thompson)
2. "Country Girl" (Margaret Lewis, Myra Smith)
3. "Don't Leave the Leavin' Up to Me" (Liz Anderson)
4. "Alabam'" (Cowboy Copas)
5. "Honey Come Back" (Jimmy Webb)
6. "Words" (Barry Gibb, Maurice Gibb, Robin Gibb)
7. "Husband Hunting" (Liz Anderson)
8. "Someday Soon" (Ian Tyson)
9. "Hello Darlin'" (Conway Twitty)
10. "Stay There 'Til I Get There" (Glenn Sutton)
11. "True Love's a Blessing" (Sonny James)
12. "I'd Run a Mile to You" (Curtis, Sutton)
13. "Fancy" (Bobbie Gentry)
14. "A Woman Lives for Love" (George Richey, Sutton, Norro Wilson)
15. "Times Just Right" (Foster, Rice)
16. "Tomorrow Never Comes" (Johnny Bond, Ernest Tubb)
17. "Heavenly Sunshine" (Richey, Sutton)
18. "Good" (Billy Sherrill, (Sutton)
19. "All Day Sucker" (Liz Anderson, Casey Anderson)
20. "Don't Leave the Leaving Up to Me" (Liz Anderson)
