= Keep Me in Mind =

Keep Me in Mind may refer to:

- Keep Me in Mind (novel), a 2005 game-novel based on Buffy the Vampire Slayer
- Keep Me in Mind (Miriam Makeba album), 1970
- Keep Me in Mind (Lynn Anderson album), 1973
- "Keep Me in Mind" (Lynn Anderson song), 1973
- "Keep Me in Mind" (Mike Spiteri song), 1995
- "Keep Me in Mind", a 2008 song by Little Joy
- "Keep Me in Mind" (Zac Brown Band song), 2011
- "Keep Me in Mind", a song by Boy George from the album Sold
- "Keep Me in Mind", a song by Mack Vickery recorded by Jerry Lee Lewis on Rock & Roll Time 2014
