= Lynn Anderson (disambiguation) =

Lynn Anderson (1947–2015) was an American country music artist and equestrian.

Lynn Anderson may refer to her eponymous albums, such as:

- Lynn Anderson (album), 1971 compilation

Similar variations, such as Lin Anderson or Lynne Anderson, may refer to:

- Lynn Anderson, maiden name of Da Yoopers keyboardist Lynn Bellmore
- Lin Anderson, a Scottish novelist and screenwriter.
- Lynne Anderson, an Australian sports administrator.
