= Listen to a Country Song =

Studio album by Lynn Anderson
- Released: 1972
- Recorded: 1972
- Genre: Countrypolitan
- Label: Columbia
- Producer: Glenn Sutton

Lynn Anderson chronology
Cry (1972)	Listen to a Country Song (1972)	Lynn Anderson's Greatest Hits (1972)

Professional ratings
Review scores
Source	Rating
AllMusic	link

Listen to a Country Song is a studio album by Country music singer Lynn Anderson, released in 1972. This was the second album released by Anderson in 1972, the other being her album Cry, which featured the No. 1 hit of the same name. This album produced two singles, one being the title track and the other being a western-tinged song, "Fool Me". Both songs were successful Country hits, both reaching the No. 4 spot in 1972.

== Writers ==
The title track was written by Alan Garth and Jim Messina. Messina would later be known for his work under the group, Loggins and Messina. "Fool Me" was written by Joe South, the writer of Anderson's best-known hit, "(I Never Promised You A) Rose Garden". The song originally appeared on South's 1971 Capitol album Joe South.

== Public response ==
The public responded well to this album, making it a big seller for Anderson. This album reached No. 3 on the "Top Country Albums" and peaked at No. 160 on the "Billboard 200" albums chart. This album consisted of 11 tracks, one of which "That's What Loving You Has Meant To Me" had appeared on an earlier Anderson album, How Can I Unlove You. Among the other songs on the album was a cover of a chart single by Anderson's mother Liz Anderson, "It Don't Do No Good to Be a Good Girl" and "There's A Party Goin' On", a hit for Jody Miller that was written by Anderson's husband Glenn Sutton and Miller's producer Billy Sherrill. Anderson wanted it as a single release of her own.

== Track listing ==
1. "Listen to a Country Song" (Alan Garth, Jim Messina)
2. "Reason to Believe" (Tim Hardin)
3. "There's a Party Goin' On" (Glenn Sutton, Billy Sherrill)
4. "Everybody's Reaching Out for Someone" (Dickey Lee, Allen Reynolds)
5. "If You Can't Be Your Woman" (G. Stovart, R. Sprague)
6. "Just Keep It Up" (Otis Blackwell)
7. "Fool Me" (Joe South)
8. "Take Me to Your World" (Glenn Sutton, Billy Sherrill)
9. "You're Everything" (Glenn Sutton, Billy Sherrill)
10. "It Don't Do No Good to Be a Good Girl" (Liz Anderson)
11. "That's What Loving You Has Meant to Me" (Glenn Sutton)
