= How Can I Unlove You (album) =

Studio album by Lynn Anderson
- Released: October 1971
- Recorded: July 1971
- Studio: Columbia (Nashville, Tennessee)
- Genre: Countrypolitan
- Label: Columbia
- Producer: Glenn Sutton, Clive Davis

Lynn Anderson chronology
Lynn Anderson (1971)	How Can I Unlove You (1971)	The Christmas Album (1971)

Professional ratings
Review scores
Source	Rating
AllMusic	link

How Can I Unlove You is an album by country music singer Lynn Anderson, released in 1971.

The album's title is derived from Anderson's No. 1 hit single late that year, "How Can I Unlove You". Written by Joe South (who had previously written her 1970 No. 1 country and pop hit, "(I Never Promised You A) Rose Garden"), the song also reached No. 63 on the pop music chart and No. 30 on the adult contemporary chart, and was Anderson's third No. 1 hit. This album includes covers of such songs as John Denver's "Take Me Home, Country Roads" and Freddie Hart's "Easy Loving". The album also includes a remake of Anderson's mother Liz's 1970 minor hit, "All Day Sucker".

How Can I Unlove You reached the No. 2 position on the Top Country Albums chart as well as reaching No. 132 on the Billboard Top LPs chart — one of the most successful albums Anderson released during her career.

== Track listing ==
1. "How Can I Unlove You" (Joe South)
2. "Don't Say Things You Don't Mean" (Glenn Sutton)
3. "You've Got a Friend" (Carole King)
4. "Easy Loving" (Freddie Hart)
5. "Here I Go Again" (Ted Harris)
6. "What's Made Milwaukee Famous (Has Made a Loser Out of Me)" (Sutton)
7. "Take Me Home, Country Roads" (John Denver, Bill Danoff, Taffy Nivert)
8. "There's Never Been Anyone Like You" (Jerry Foster, Bill Rice)
9. "All Day Sucker" (Liz Anderson, Casey Anderson)
10. "That's What Loving You Has Meant to Me" (Sutton)
11. "Simple Words" (Sutton)

== Charts ==
=== Weekly charts ===
Chart (1971–1972)	Peak position
US Billboard 200	132
US Top Country Albums (Billboard)	2

=== Year-end charts ===
Chart (1972)	Position
US Top Country Albums (Billboard)	9
