= I Want to Be a Cowboy's Sweetheart =

1935 country song by Patsy Montana

"I Wanna Be a Cowboy's Sweetheart"

Song by Patsy Montana Acc. by Prairie Ramblers
- B-side: "Ridin' Old Paint"
- Written: 1934
- Published: 1935 Bob Miller, Inc. Universal - On Backstreet Music Inc. 1965
- Released: November 1935
- Recorded: August 16, 1935
- Studio: ARC Studios, New York City
- Genre: Country (Hillbilly), Western
- Label: Melotone 51156
- Songwriter: Patsy Montana
- Producer: Art Satherley

"I Wanna Be a Cowboy's Sweetheart" is a country and western song written in 1934 and first recorded in 1935 by Ruby Blevins, who performed as Patsy Montana. It was the first country song by a female artist to sell more than one million copies.

== Background and release ==
Montana wrote the song in 1934 when she was feeling lonely and missing her boyfriend; it was recorded a year later when producer Art Satherley, of ARC Records, needed one more song at a Prairie Ramblers recording session. Montana was the group's soloist at the time. Her song is based on Stuart Hamblen's western song Texas Plains: he is therefore credited as a cowriter. Patsy Montana embellished the simpler musical pattern of the original, especially with her yodeling. Patsy also used a lot of the original words: the song is somewhat of a feminine answer to its precursor.

== Reception ==
Members of the Western Writers of America chose it as one of the Top 100 Western songs of all time. In 2012 her record was added to the Library of Congress's National Recording Registry list of "culturally, historically, or aesthetically important" American sound recordings.

== Cover versions ==
"I Want to Be a Cowboy's Sweetheart" has been recorded by, among others,

- Rosalie Allen, in a 1940s yodeling version,
- Patti Page (as a single)
- Suzy Bogguss (on her 1989 album Somewhere Between). Her version peaked at #77 on the Hot Country Songs chart.
- Dixie Chicks (on their 1990 debut album Thank Heavens for Dale Evans)
- Lynn Anderson (on her 1992 album Cowboy's Sweetheart)
- Nickel Creek on their 1993 album Little Cowpoke
- LeAnn Rimes (on her 1994 album All That)
- Clelia Adams on her 2004 album Heartbeat Highway
- Leslie Avril on her 1994 album Champagne and Desolation
- Bev McShanag and Olive Bice on their 1985 cassette Yodelling in Harmony
- The Cartwheels (The Australian band) on their 2001 ep The Cartwheels
- Ha*Ash (American band) made a Spanish yodeling version of the song called "Vaquera" on her 2005 album Mundos Opuestos.
- Phish (performed in 1996 and released in 2007 on Vegas 96)
- Cyndi Lauper featuring yodeling Jewel (on her 2016 album Detour).
