= Cry (Lynn Anderson album) =

Studio album by Lynn Anderson
- Released: 1972
- Recorded: 1972
- Genre: Countrypolitan
- Label: Columbia
- Producer: Glenn Sutton, Clive Davis

Lynn Anderson chronology
The World of Lynn Anderson (1971)	Cry (1972)	Listen to a Country Song (1972)

Professional ratings
Review scores
Source	Rating
AllMusic	3/5 stars

Cry is a studio album by the American musician Lynn Anderson, released in 1972.

This album was based on Lynn Anderson's hit from early 1972, "Cry", which hit No. 3 on the Billboard Country charts, and No. 1 on the Cashbox Country charts. In addition the song also reached No. 71 on the Pop charts, and No. 16 on the Adult Contemporary charts that year. This album shows Anderson's new direction into placing her voice into more pop-oriented songs, including "Cry" (originally a No. 1 pop hit for Johnnie Ray in 1951). After having a No. 1 country and pop hit in late 1970, "(I Never Promised You a) Rose Garden", her record company set her records out more for the Pop market, and never looked back. This helped Lynn Anderson gain the biggest success she ever had for a number of years. Thus, this left Anderson from recording the hard country material she recorded for her late 1960s albums under Chart Records.

Lynn's husband, Glenn Sutton, produced the album with Clive Davis. Most of the songs featured here are pop songs, like the Addrisi Brothers' "We've Got to Get It on Again" and Sonny & Cher's "When You Say Love". With the help of legendary country producer, Billy Sherrill, Sutton wrote some of the songs for this album, some of which had been previously hits for country singers, like Barbara Mandrell's "Tonight My Baby's Coming Home". This album was a big-selling album, reaching No. 2 on the "Top Country Albums" chart and No. 114 on the "Billboard 200" albums chart.

== Track listing ==
Side one
No.	Title	Writer(s)	Length
1.	"Cry"	Churchill Kohlman	3:08
2.	"Never Ending Song of Love"	Delaney Bramlett	2:34
3.	"Ask Any Woman"	Gerard Langley, Jimmy Stewart	2:09
4.	"Bedtime Story"	Glenn Sutton, Billy Sherrill	4:06
5.	"I Won’t Mention It Again"	Cam Mullins	3:50
6.	"Tonight My Baby's Coming Home"	Glenn Sutton, Billy Sherrill	2:11

Side two
No.	Title	Writer(s)	Length
1.	"Cotton Jenny"	Gordon Lightfoot	2:42
2.	"Kiss Away"	Glenn Sutton, Billy Sherrill	2:25
3.	"When You Say Love"	Jerry Foster, Bill Rice	2:16
4.	"We Can Make It"	Glenn Sutton, Billy Sherrill	2:03
5.	"We’ve Got to Get It on Again"	Dick Addrisi, Don Addrisi	2:22

== Personnel ==
- Lynn Anderson – Vocals
- Louis Bradley – Engineer
- Charlie Bragg – Engineer
- The Jordanaires – Background Vocals
- Cam Mullins – Arranger
- The Nashville Edition – Background Vocals
- Glenn Sutton – Arranger

== Charts ==
=== Weekly charts ===
Chart (1972)	Peak position
US Billboard 200	114
US Top Country Albums (Billboard)	2

=== Year-end charts ===
Chart (1972)	Position
US Top Country Albums (Billboard)	7
