= Back (Lynn Anderson album) =

Studio album by Lynn Anderson
- Released: 1983
- Recorded: 1983
- Studio: Quadrafonic Sound, Nashville, Tennessee
- Genre: Urban cowboy, country pop, country rock
- Label: Permian Records
- Producer: Michael Clark

Lynn Anderson chronology
The Best of Lynn Anderson: Memories and Desires (1982)	Back (1983)	What She Does Best (1988)

Back is a 1983 studio album by country music singer Lynn Anderson.

== Background, recording and content ==
Lynn Anderson had a series of number one and top ten singles during the 1970s. These singles included "You're My Man", "How Can I Unlove You", "Keep Me in Mind" and her most successful "Rose Garden". As the decade progressed, Anderson's chart run began to wane and she eventually left Columbia Records in 1981. With the help of Chuck Robinson, Anderson signed a recording contract with Permian Records (with distribution from MCA Records). Anderson went into record her first album with the label in January 1983 alongside producer Michael Clark. The sessions were held at the Quadrafonic Sound studio in Nashville, Tennessee.

== Track listing ==
1. "You Can't Lose What You Never Had"
2. "Love Comes Around Again"
3. "What I Learned from Loving You"
4. "Your Kisses Lied"
5. "At This Moment"
6. "Fool for Love"
7. "Heartbreak Kid"
8. "This Time the Heartbreak Wins"
9. "Mr. Sundown"
10. "You're Welcome to Tonight" (with Gary Morris)

== Personnel ==
- Background Vocals: Lynn Anderson, Stephen Brantley, Bruce Dees, Marsha Wood
- Bass guitar: Larry Paxton
- Drums: Clyde Brooks
- Duet Vocals: Gary Morris on "You're Welcome to Tonight"
- Guitar: Mark Casstevens, Michael Clark, Bruce Dees, Doyle Grisham, Dann Huff, Dan Roth, Michael Spriggs, Chip Young
- Harmonica: Terry McMillan
- Keyboards: Mitch Humphries, Buddy Skipper
- Lead Vocals: Lynn Anderson
- Steel Guitar: Sonny Garrish, Weldon Myrick
- Synthesizer: Michael Clark

== Chart performance ==
Chart (1983)	Peak position
US Top Country Albums (Billboard)	61
