= You're My Man =

You're My Man may refer to:

- You're My Man (song), a 1971 single by Lynn Anderson
- You're My Man (album), a 1971 album by Lynn Anderson
