= Western Music Association Hall of Fame =

- Established: 1988
- Location: Coppell, Texas
- Type: Music
- Director: Rich Dollarhide, Juni Fisher, Theresa O'Dell, Tom Swearingen
- President: Robert Lorbeer, Esq.
- Website: iwesternmusic.org/award.php?2

The Western Music Association Hall of Fame is sponsored by the International Western Music Association. Inductees are those individuals deemed important to the traditional and contemporary music of the American West and the American Cowboy. The organization is headquartered in Coppell, Texas.

== Inductees ==
=== 1989-1999 ===
1989

- Rex Allen
- Gene Autry
- Patsy Montana
- Tex Ritter
- Marty Robbins
- Roy Rogers
- Dale Evans
- Sons of the Pioneers

1990

- Eddie Dean
- Cindy Walker
- Johnny Bond
- Elton Britt

1991

- Wilf Carter
- Andy Parker and The Plainsmen
- Jimmy Wakely
- Foy Willing and The Riders of the Purple Sage

1992

- None

1993

- Rosalie Allen
- Riders in the Sky
- Hi Busse and The Frontiersmen

1994

- Bob Nolan
- Tim Spencer

1995

- Bob Wills and The Texas Playboys

1996

- Ray Whitley
- Cass County Boys

1997

- Herb Jeffries
- Stan Jones
- Wesley Tuttle

1998

- Billy Beeman
- Smiley Burnett
- The Reinsmen

1999

- Stuart Hamblen
- Billy Hill
- Jim Bob Tinsley

=== 2000-2009 ===
2000

- Slim Clark
- The Beverly Hillbillies
- Frankie Laine

2001

- Johnny Western
- Carolina Cotton
- Monte Hale
- Carson Robison

2002

- None

2003

- None

2004

- Rusty Richards
- Dimitri Tiomkin
- The Jimmy Wakely Trio
- Michael Martin Murphey

2005

- Ken Maynard
- John M. "Jack" Elliott
- Don Edwards
- Red Steagall

2006

- Carl T. Sprague
- Sons of the San Joaquin

2007

- Fleming Allan
- Rex Allen Jr.

2008

- Bing Crosby
- Tommy Doss
- Lloyd Perryman
- Dale Warren
- Ian Tyson

2009

- John Lomax
- Rich O'Brien
- Flying W Wranglers

=== 2010-2019 ===
2010

- Frankie Marvin
- John A. Lomax

2011

- R.W. Hampton
- Vaughn Monroe

2012

Ken and Nora Griffis

2013

- Johnny Cash
- Louise Massey & The Westerners
- Jimmy Kennedy & Michael Carr

2014

- Glenn Spencer
- The Farr Brothers
- Joey Miskulin

2015

- Bob Atcher
- Chris LeDoux

2016

- Pat Brady
- Dave Stamey

2017

- Eddy Arnold
- Slim Dusty
- Johnny Marvin
- Fred Rose

2018

- Girls of the Golden West
- Robert Wagoner

2019

- Lynn Anderson
- Cowboy Joe Babcock

== See also ==
- List of music museums
