= Fool Me =

- German release picture sleeve

Single by Lynn Anderson

from the album Listen to a Country Song
- B-side: "What's Made Milwaukee Famous"
- Released: October 1972
- Genre: Country
- Label: Columbia
- Songwriter(s): Joe South
- Producer(s): Glenn Sutton

Lynn Anderson singles chronology
"Listen to a Country Song" (1972)	"Fool Me" (1972)	"Keep Me in Mind" (1973)

"Fool Me" is a song written by Joe South. South's version was released as a single in 1971 and peaked at number 78 on the Billboard Hot 100.

== Lynn Anderson version ==
"Fool Me" was also recorded by American country music artist Lynn Anderson. Released in October 1972, it was the second single from her album Listen to a Country Song. The song peaked at number 4 on the Billboard Hot Country Singles chart. It also reached number 1 on the RPM Country Tracks chart in Canada.

== Chart performance ==
=== Joe South ===
Chart (1971)	Peak position
U.S. Billboard Hot 100	78

=== Lynn Anderson ===
Chart (1972)	Peak position
U.S. Billboard Hot Country Singles	4
U.S. Billboard Bubbling Under Hot 100	1
Canadian RPM Country Tracks	1
