= Bridges (Lynn Anderson album) =

Studio album by Lynn Anderson
- Released: June 9, 2015
- Genre: Country-gospel
- Length: 43:34
- Label: Center Sound
- Producer: Bill VornDick

Lynn Anderson chronology
Cowgirl II (2010)	Bridges (2015)

Singles from Bridges
- 1. "Drift Away Gospel" Released: May 2015

Bridges is the 37th and final studio album by American country artist Lynn Anderson. It was released on June 9, 2015, via Center Sound Productions and was produced by Bill VornDick. Bridges was Anderson's 37th studio recording of her career and her first album of gospel music. The album contained a variety of new and older gospel tracks. It was released a month prior to her death, making Bridges the final studio release in Anderson's career. The album also contained one single release.

== Background ==
Bridges was created from the failure of another album project. Anderson had recorded several gospel tracks for an independent label, but the album's manager got fired. Instead, her producer bought the tracks and helped her finish the album. "You never know where your next deal might come from," Anderson said in 2015. Bridges was produced by Bill VornDick, who had previously produced her 2004 album, The Bluegrass Sessions. Anderson stated in 2015 that she enjoyed working with VornDick on the project, praising his mixing capabilities. Anderson also enlisted her daughter, Lisa Sutton, to create the artwork for the project.

== Content ==
Bridges featured a collection of 12 country gospel tracks. One song, "Drift Away Gospel", was penned by Anderson's domestic partner Mentor Williams. The song was a gospel reworking of the original track first recorded in the 1970s. "He rewrote it for our little church in Taos, New Mexico. We’d been singing it in church for a couple of years. The congregation loves it, and I hope our audience loves it," Anderson reflected. The album's eighth track, "My Guardian Angel," was penned by her mother Liz Anderson. Although her mother had died prior to the album, Anderson stated she enjoyed putting her mother's compositions into her record projects. The album also features vocal harmonies from groups The Oak Ridge Boys and The Martins. Also included is the track, "Heaven Has a Human Touch," which was co-written by singer-songwriter Mike Reid. Anderson recounted her appreciation for Reid's writing: "It’s a great song that was written by Mike Reid, who is one of my favorite songwriters in Nashville. He’s written so many big hits."

== Release and reception ==
Professional ratings
Review scores
Source	Rating
Digital Journal	4.5/5 stars
Hallels	Favorable

Prior to the release of the album, "Drift Away Gospel" was released as the first single in May 2015. The album was officially released on June 9, 2015, via Center Sound Productions. It was Anderson's first project in five years and 37th studio project in her career. One month later, on July 31, 2015, Anderson died from complications of pneumonia. Ultimately, Bridges became Anderson's final album release in her career.

The album was reviewed positively by Hallels writer Timothy Yap. "Bridges finds Anderson abandoning her popish appeal in favour of a more sympathetically country backing which brings out a warmer (and more plaintive) feel of the songs," he commented. Markos Papadatos of Digital Journal also gave the record a positive response, calling the project "phenomenal." He highlighted tracks such as "Drift Away," "Sky Full of Angels," and "Wanderer's Prayer." Overall, he gave the project 4.5 out of 5 stars. "Overall, Lynn Anderson is amazing on her latest studio album, Bridges. She is one artist that never disappoints on any album or single that she records and releases. This project deserves a Grammy nomination to the very least, and the folks at the Country Music Hall of Fame and Museum ought to take notice."

== Track listing ==
Bridges (2015)
No.	Title	Writer(s)	Length
1.	"Heaven Has a Human Touch"	Kye Fleming; Mike Reid	4:19
2.	"Get Up Joseph" (featuring The Oak Ridge Boys)	Reid; Allen Shamblin	3:34
3.	"The Bridge"	Tony Haselton; Adam Wheeler	3:52
4.	"Drift Away Gospel"	Mentor Williams	3:59
5.	"He Saw It All"	Daryl Mosley	3:16
6.	"Meanwhile Back at the Cross"	Chip Davis; Doug Johnson; Kim Williams	3:35
7.	"Sky Full of Angels"	Burton Collins; Clay Mills; Lisa Stewart	2:50
8.	"My Guardian Angel"	Liz Anderson	3:21
9.	"Fishin'"	Don Goodman; John Greenbaum; Craig Karp	3:23
10.	"Wanderer's Prayer"	Larry Wayne Clark; Jeff Walter	3:36
11.	"The Road to Surrender"	Angie Commons; Gary Duffey; Buffy Lawson	4:06
12.	"Rise Up"	Paul Overstreet; Don Schlitz	3:43

== Personnel ==
All credits are adapted from Allmusic.

Musical personnel

- Lynn Anderson – lead vocals
- Chip Davis – background vocals
- Bruce Dees – background vocals, electric guitar
- Mark Fain – bass
- Sonny Garrish – steel dobro
- Steve Gibson – electric guitar
- Pete Huttlinger – acoustic guitar
- The Martins – guest artist
- The Oak Ridge Boys – guest artist
- Bobby Ogdin – Hammond b3 organ
- Angela Primm – background vocals
- Jason Roller – fiddle, mandolin
- Amaleia Rubble – background vocals
- Lisa Silver – background vocals
- Milton Smith – strings
- Cindy Richardson Walker – background vocals
- Lynn Williams – drums
- Reggie Young – electric guitar

Technical personnel

- Eric Darken – percussion
- Chip Davis – engineering
- Bruce Dees – engineering
- Ron Fairchild – engineering
- Michelle Rahmani – production coordination
- Lisa Sutton – art direction, photography
- Bill VornDick – engineering, producer

== Release history ==
Region	Date	Format	Label	Ref.
United States	June 9, 2015	Compact disc	Center Sound Productions	
United States	June 9, 2015	Music download	Center Sound Productions	
