= You're Welcome to Tonight =

Single by Lynn Anderson and Gary Morris

from the album Back
- B-side: "Your Kisses Lied"
- Released: December 17, 1983
- Genre: Country pop
- Length: 3:46
- Label: Permian
- Songwriters: Jim Hurt, Larry Henley, Grant Boatwright
- Producers: Michael Clark; Jimmy Bowen (remix)

Lynn Anderson singles chronology
"What I Learned from Loving You" (1983)	"You're Welcome to Tonight" (1983)	"Heart of the Matter" (1984)

Gary Morris singles chronology
"Why Lady Why" (1983)	"You're Welcome to Tonight" (1983)	"Between Two Fires" (1984)

"You're Welcome to Tonight" is a song written by Jim Hurt, Larry Henley and Grant Boatwright, and recorded by American country music artists Lynn Anderson and Gary Morris. It was released in December 1983 as the third single from Anderson's album Back. The song reached number 9 on the Billboard Hot Country Singles & Tracks chart.

== Chart performance ==
Chart (1983–1984)	Peak position
US Hot Country Songs (Billboard)	9
