= Lynn Anderson (album) =

Compilation album by Lynn Anderson
- Released: October 1971
- Genre: Country music; Nashville Sound
- Label: Chart
- Producer: Slim Williamson

Lynn Anderson chronology
You're My Man (1971)	Lynn Anderson (1971)	How Can I Unlove You (1971)

Lynn Anderson is a compilation album by American country artist Lynn Anderson. It was released in October 1971 via Chart Records and was produced by Slim Williamson. It was the sixth compilation released in Anderson's career and her final release for the Chart label. The album was a double record that contained 24 songs in total.

== Background, release and reception ==
Lynn Anderson a double-album compilation released following her departure from the Chart record company. Anderson had left the label in 1970 to record for the larger Columbia Records. Since her departure, Chart released several compilations of her earlier work. This compilation was her last with Chart to be released in the United States. All of the material was produced by Slim Williamson. All songs had first been released on earlier albums. A total of 24 tracks were included on this double set album. Included were some of her biggest Chart hits, such as "If I Kiss You (Will You Go Away)" and "Big Girls Don't Cry." Also included was several cover versions of hits first recorded by other artists, such as Johnny Cash's "Ring of Fire" and Merle Haggard's "(My Friends Are Gonna Be) Strangers."

The album was released in October 1971 via Chart Records, becoming her sixth compilation release in her career. The album was issued as a vinyl LP, containing two records. Each record contained a total of 12 songs, with six songs on each side. Like her previous Chart compilation, the record did not reach any chart positions on Billboard upon its release. This included the Top Country Albums chart. The album did receive positive reception in later years from Allmusic. The publication gave it 4.5 out of 5 possible stars.

== Track listing ==
=== Record one ===
Side one
No.	Title	Writer(s)	Length
1.	"Big Girls Don't Cry"	Liz Anderson	2:26
2.	"Pick of the Week"	Anderson	2:16
3.	"Honey"	Bobby Russell	4:20
4.	"Just Between the Two of Us"	Anderson	2:51
5.	"I Live to Love You"	Glenn Sutton	2:33
6.	"Strangers"	Anderson	2:33

Side two
No.	Title	Writer(s)	Length
1.	"The Pillow That Whispers"	Cal Veale	2:42
2.	"Ring of Fire"	Anita Carter; Merle Kilgore	1:42
3.	"Come on Home"	Jack Rhodes	2:32
4.	"Wandering Mind"	Leon Ashley; Margie Singleton	2:22
5.	"You Mean the World to Me"	Sutton	2:23
6.	"I Keep Forgettin' (That I Forgot About You)"	Anderson	1:51

=== Record two ===
Side one
No.	Title	Writer(s)	Length
1.	"Ride, Ride, Ride"	Anderson	2:00
2.	"Then Go"	Anderson	2:26
3.	"Beggars Can't Be Choosers"	Anderson	2:00
4.	"In Person"	Anderson	2:15
5.	"It's Only Lonely Me"	Casey Anderson; Liz Anderson	2:31
6.	"If This Is Love"	L. Anderson	2:14

Side two
No.	Title	Writer(s)	Length
1.	"If I Kiss You (Will You Go Away)"	L. Anderson	2:10
2.	"Too Much of You"	Gene Hood	2:20
3.	"There Oughta Be a Law"	Joe Gibson	2:40
4.	"It Makes You Happy"	Gene Woods	2:37
5.	"Tear by Tear"	Jerry Lane	2:05
6.	"My Heart Keeps Walkin' the Floor"	Lynn Anderson	2:37

== Personnel ==
All credits are adapted from the liner notes of Lynn Anderson.

Musical and technical personnel

- Lynn Anderson – lead vocals
- Slim Williamson – producer

== Release history ==
Region	Date	Format	Label	Ref.
United States	October 1971	Vinyl	Chart Records	
