= Compendia Music Group =

American record label and distributor

- Company type: Incentive
- Industry: Record Label
- Founded: 2001; United States
- Headquarters: United States

Compendia Music Group was an American record label and distributor that operated in the early 2000s.

Compendia was formed in late 2001 by Marty Tudor from the assets of the bankrupt label Platinum Entertainment. It was based in Nashville, Tennessee, and distributed music from the label's own artists as well as acting as a distributor for music from other labels. Its distribution business was based in Alpharetta, Georgia, until December 2003, when Compendia closed the division in favor of distributing via Koch Entertainment. In December 2004, Compendia was acquired by Sheridan Square Entertainment.
