= Salty Holmes =

American country musician (1910–1970)

Floyd Holmes (March 6, 1910 – January 1, 1970), better known as Salty Holmes, was an American country musician, harmonica player and Western B-movie actor.

== Biography ==
Holmes was born in Glasgow, Kentucky. He became a virtuoso on the harmonica, specializing in the style known as "talking harp" which imitated the human voice (much like Sonny Terry). He also played the jug and guitar. He formed the group The Kentucky Ramblers in 1930, who changed their name to The Prairie Ramblers in 1933 and began broadcasting on Chicago radio station WLS-AM with new vocalist Patsy Montana. They continued performing and recording under this name until 1952, playing country, hillbilly music, gospel, and pop songs. They were the backing group on Montana's platinum hit "I Want to Be a Cowboy's Sweetheart". Group members included Jack Taylor on bass, Chick Hurt on mandolin, and Alan Crocket and, later, Tex Atchison on fiddle. They made over 100 recordings between 1933 and 1940, including as session musicians.

The Prairie Ramblers have been called a "hot string band" and "a hot fiddler band". Both their "aggressive rhythms" and Chick Hurt's mandolin playing inspired Bill Monroe, a mandolin virtuoso who is regarded as the "father of bluegrass".

While a member of the Prairie Ramblers, Holmes befriended Gene Autry, who invited him to Hollywood to star in Westerns in 1936 and 1944; among the films Holmes appeared in are Arizona Days and Saddle Leather Law. In a scene of Arizona Days, Holmes played two harmonicas using his mouth and nose. The Prairie Ramblers also backed Autry on some of his recordings in the 1930s.

He collaborated with Jean Chapel as Mattie & Salty, playing regularly on the Grand Ole Opry; the two married in 1947 and divorced in 1956 and had two daughters named Barbara Holmes Hale and Lana (Chapel) who was part of their act as a young child.
