= Cowboy's Sweetheart =

Studio album by Lynn Anderson
- Released: June 1992
- Recorded: 1992
- Genre: Country
- Length: 34:55
- Label: Laserlight Records
- Producer: Ralph Jungheim

Lynn Anderson chronology
What She Does Best (1988)	Cowboy's Sweetheart (1992)	Latest and Greatest (1998)

Professional ratings
Review scores
Source	Rating
Allmusic	2/5 stars

Cowboy's Sweetheart is the name of a studio album, released by country singer Lynn Anderson in 1992.

Anderson had recently finished a long and lucrative career in the country music business, releasing and promoting albums and singles for the public. She finished her last album in 1988 with What She Does Best, and a final single from that album titled, "How Many Hearts". This was her first album in four years and contains all new material. The album has a more Western music theme than previous releases, with songs reflecting this theme. The title Cowboy's Sweetheart fits Anderson's own personal profile since she used to be a professional equestrian and horse racer during her time spent away from the music business.

Songs included on this album were new songs for Anderson to record, but many were cover versions, including her own Top 30 hit from 1980, "Even Cowgirls Get the Blues", as well as Patsy Montana's 1935 classic Western hit, "I Want to Be a Cowboy's Sweetheart", and Slim Whitman's "Red River Valley". Pop songs that have a Western theme are also included here, such as Gogi Grant's "The Wayward Wind" (a duet with Emmylou Harris) and Cole Porter's "Don't Fence Me In".

== Track listing ==
1. "I Want to Be a Cowboy's Sweetheart" (Patsy Montana) – 2:53
2. "Ponies" – 4:16
3. "Desperado" (Glenn Frey, Don Henley) – 3:23
4. "Even Cowgirls Get the Blues" (Rodney Crowell) – 3:04
5. "Run for the Roses" (Dan Fogelberg) – 4:03
6. "Someday Soon" (Ian Tyson) – 3:50
7. "Don't Fence Me In" (Robert Fletcher, Cole Porter) – 2:57
8. "The Wayward Wind" (Stanley Lebowsky, Herb Newman) – 3:26
  - duet with Emmylou Harris
9. "Red River Valley" – 4:21
10. "Happy Trails" (Dale Evans) – 2:42

== Personnel ==
- Lynn Anderson – Vocals
- Dan Dugmore – Steel Guitar
- Jack Hale – Arranger, Keyboards, Leader
- Jim Horn – Flute
- Jelly Roll Johnson – Harmonica
- Ralph Jungheim – Producer
- Chris Leuzinger – Guitar
- Gary Prim – Piano, Keyboards
- Mike Rojas – Piano, Keyboards
- Milton Sledge – Drums
- Bob Wray – Bass
