= Songs That Made Country Girls Famous =

Studio album by Lynn Anderson
- Released: 1969
- Genre: Country
- Label: Chart

Lynn Anderson chronology
At Home with Lynn (1969)	Songs That Made Country Girls Famous (1969)	Uptown Country Girl (1970)

Songs That Made Country Girls Famous is a studio album by Lynn Anderson released in 1969. The album became Anderson's second top ten LP on Billboard's Top Country Albums chart, peaking at #9.

The eleven song album features covers of major hits in the careers of eleven female country singers, although in several cases the song is not actually the one that made the artist famous. Lynn Anderson herself is included in the eleven, with a remake version of her first charted single "Ride Ride Ride", released only three years prior to this album. No singles were released from the album when it premiered in 1969, however two years later after Anderson had moved on to Columbia Records, Chart would release "It Wasn't God Who Made Honky Tonk Angels" as a single resulting in a Top 20 record on the Billboard country chart.

The cover photograph shows Anderson sitting near her vintage record player with albums by female country album artists before her. Shown are albums by Skeeter Davis, Tammy Wynette, Kitty Wells, Liz Anderson, Loretta Lynn, Connie Smith, Dottie West, and Jeannie C. Riley with a Jeannie Seely album peaking out between two other albums. Anderson covers hits by all of these artists on the album with the exception of Skeeter Davis. She also covers Bonnie Guitar and Patsy Cline, but albums by them are not among the albums on the floor.

== Track listing ==
1. "Once a Day" - (Bill Anderson), a Connie Smith hit
2. "I Fall to Pieces" - (Harlan Howard, Hank Cochran) a Patsy Cline hit
3. "You Ain't Woman Enough" - (Loretta Lynn) - a Loretta Lynn hit
4. "It Wasn't God Who Made Honky Tonk Angels" - (J. D. Miller) - a Kitty Wells hit
5. "Mama Spank" (Liz Anderson) - A Liz Anderson hit
6. "Dark Moon (song)" - (Ned Miller) - a Bonnie Guitar hit
7. "Here Comes My Baby Back Again" - (Dottie West, Bill West), a Dottie West hit
8. "Harper Valley P.T.A." - (Tom T. Hall), a Jeannie C. Riley hit
9. "Don't Touch Me" - (Hank Cochran) - a Jeannie Seely hit
10. "Your Good Girl's Gonna Go Bad" - (Glenn Sutton, Billy Sherrill) - a Tammy Wynette hit
11. "Ride Ride Ride" - (Liz Anderson), a Lynn Anderson hit
