= Cowgirl (album) =

Studio album by Lynn Anderson
- Released: September 20, 2006
- Studio: Sound Control Studios
- Genre: Country; western
- Length: 37:41
- Label: Showboat
- Producer: Casey Anderson; Mark Moseley

Lynn Anderson chronology
The Bluegrass Sessions (2005)	Cowgirl (2006)	Cowgirl II (2010)

Singles from Cowgirl
- 1. "Full Moon in Baghdad" Released: 2006

Cowgirl is a studio album by American country artist Lynn Anderson. It was released on September 20, 2006 via Showboat Records. The record was co-produced by Casey Anderson and Mark Moseley. Consisting of 12 tracks, Cowgirl was a collection of songs recorded with a western theme. The songs had been composed by Anderson's mother and was her first studio effort to feature songs entirely written by her.

== Background and content ==
Cowgirl was Anderson's first album of western music. According to an interview with American Cowboy, Anderson wanted to record the project so listeners would appreciate the genre more. "These days I’m trying to present Western music in what you might call a sophisticated way—reminding people who might not be familiar with the Western genre of classic Western heroes and the Western way of life," she recalled. Cowgirl was recorded at Sound Control Studios, located in Nashville, Tennessee. The project was produced by Casey Anderson (her father) and Mark Moseley.

Cowgirl was recorded as a tribute to Anderson's mother. In the album's liner notes, she credits her mother for her success as well as an inspiration. "It is a tribute to my mom, Liz Anderson, and her music. I've always thought of my Mom and Dad as Roy and Dale or Ron and Nancy," she wrote. Her mother had previously had a recording career and composed material for several country artists. Her own writing success led to her daughter's first recording contracts in the 1960s. Twelve tracks were on the collection, all of which had been composed by her mother, Liz Anderson.

== Release and reception ==
Cowgirl was released on September 20, 2006 on Showboat Records, her mother's recording company. It was Anderson's 35th studio recording in her career. The album was issued as a compact disc originally. However, it was later issued in digital formats. The album did not reach any chart positions on Billboard upon its release. The album did spawn one single, "Full Moon in Baghdad." The track was first released in 2006. Although the album did not receive any known reviews, it did receive major awards from the Academy of Western Artists. In 2007, Cowgirl won awards for Best Western Song, Best Western Album, Best Western Swing Album and Best Female Vocalist.

== Track listing ==
All songs composed by Liz Anderson, except where noted.

Cowgirl (2006)
No.	Title	Writer(s)	Length
1.	"If I Had My Boots"	Liz Anderson; Lola Jean Dillon	2:46
2.	"Bad Cowboys"		2:53
3.	"I Rode in As a Stranger"		3:59
4.	"All Hat and No Cattle"		2:46
5.	"From the Bottom of My Broken Heart"		3:36
6.	"Cowboys Are a Girl's Best Friend"		3:02
7.	"Dale Evans"		3:19
8.	"Be My Cowboy"		2:21
9.	"Full Moon in Baghdad"	Liz Anderson; Lynn Anderson	3:52
10.	"Wild Wild Women of the Wild Wild West"		2:33
11.	"The Bull Rider"		3:19
12.	"May the Trail Rise Up to Greet You"	Liz Anderson; Dave Stamey	3:06
Total length:			37:41

== Personnel ==
All credits are adapted from the liner notes of Cowgirl.

Musical and technical personnel

- Casey Anderson – producer
- Lynn Anderson – lead vocals, background vocals
- Margie Cates – background vocals
- Mark Moseley – producer
- Lisa Sutton – graphic design

== Release history ==
Region	Date	Format	Label	Ref.
United States	September 20, 2006	Compact disc	Showboat Records	
United States	2010s	Music download	Showboat Records	
