= Keep Me in Mind (Lynn Anderson album) =

Studio album by Lynn Anderson
- Released: 1973
- Recorded: 1973
- Genre: Countrypolitan
- Label: Columbia
- Producer: Glenn Sutton

Lynn Anderson chronology
Lynn Anderson's Greatest Hits (1972)	Keep Me in Mind (1973)	Top of the World (1973)

Professional ratings
Review scores
Source	Rating
Allmusic	2/5 stars

Keep Me in Mind is a studio album by country music singer Lynn Anderson, released in 1973.

This album reached No. 7 on the Billboard "Top Country Albums" chart in mid-1973, and was named after Anderson's No. 1 single from that year, "Keep Me in Mind". This was the only single off this album.

This album consists of 11 tracks. The flip side of "Keep Me in Mind", "Rodeo Cowboy", is featured on this album, and would later be released as a single itself in late 1976 off Anderson's All the King's Horses album.

This album was produced by Glenn Sutton, Anderson's husband.

== Track listing ==
1. "Keep Me in Mind" – (Glenn Sutton, George Richey)
2. "Pass Me By" – (H. B. Hall)
3. "I Believe in Music" – (Mac Davis)
4. "Just Between the Two of Us" – (Liz Anderson)
5. "All or Nothing of Me"
6. "The City of New Orleans" – (Steve Goodman)
7. "Home Is Where I Hang My Head"
8. "A Perfect Match"
9. "Who I Could Turn To"
10. "Half a Dozen Tricycle Motors"
11. "Rodeo Cowboy" – Glenn Sutton
