= Cowgirl II =

Studio album by Lynn Anderson
- Released: January 28, 2010
- Studio: Sound Control Studios
- Genre: Country; western
- Length: 39:52
- Label: Showboat
- Producer: Casey Anderson; Liz Anderson; Mark Moseley

Lynn Anderson chronology
Cowgirl (2006)	Cowgirl II (2010)	Bridges (2015)

Cowgirl II is a studio album by American country artist Lynn Anderson. It was released on January 28, 2010, via Showboat Records. The project was co-produced by Casey Anderson, Liz Anderson and Mark Moseley. The project was Anderson's second album of western music and the 36th studio release of her career. The album featured tracks mostly written by her mother.

== Background and content ==
Cowgirl II was the second western album project Anderson had recorded. The previous release was 2006's Cowgirl, which incorporated a similar album theme. According to an interview with American Cowboy, Anderson wanted to record the project so listeners would appreciate the genre more. "These days I’m trying to present Western music in what you might call a sophisticated way—reminding people who might not be familiar with the Western genre of classic Western heroes and the Western way of life," she recalled. Cowgirl II was recorded at Sound Control Studios, located in Nashville, Tennessee. It was co-produced by her parents, Casey and Liz Anderson. Similar her 2006 release, Cowgirl II was composed of songs written by Liz Anderson. Six of the album's tracks were written by her mother. Anderson's mother was a country music songwriter who wrote hits for several artists (including her daughter) and helped to jump start her daughter's own recording career. Also included on the album are vocals from actor Barry Corbin and radio personality Bob Kingsley.

== Release and reception ==
Cowgirl II was released on January 28, 2010, on Showboat Records. It was the 36th studio recording of Anderson's career and second to be released on Showboat. The album was issued as a compact disc, which contained liner notes and album information. The album would also be issued as a music download and to digital streamers, including Apple Music. Like her previous album releases, Cowgirl II did not reach any chart positions on Billboard upon its release. This includes the Top Country Albums chart. The album received positive reception upon its release. Western Way magazine's Don Cusic praised the project in their winter 2010 edition. "Lynn Anderson has been on a long, hard ride to get back to the West. These songs have found a new home where Lynn calls herself home," he commented.

== Track listing ==
Cowgirl II (2010)
No.	Title	Writer(s)	Length
1.	"Ride, Ride, Ride"	Liz Anderson	2:19
2.	"Turn the Herd" (featuring Barry Corbin and Bob Kingsley)	Casey Anderson; Liz Anderson	4:05
3.	"Mexican Angel" (with Rollie Stevens)	Anderson	2:45
4.	"Bandita" (with Michael Hearne)	Michael Hearne; Mentor Williams	4:21
5.	"Only the Rocks Live Forever"	Anderson	2:53
6.	"Someday Soon"	Ian Tyson	3:55
7.	"Rose of Cimarron"	Rusty Young	4:32
8.	"Buckskin Horse"	Dave Stamey	4:05
9.	"Virginia City"	Anderson	4:13
Total length:			39:52

Bonus track
No.	Title	Writer(s)	Length
10.	"The Loan" (with Belinda Gail)	Anderson	3:33

== Personnel ==
All credits are adapted from the liner notes of Cowgirl II.

Musical personnel

- Lynn Anderson – lead vocals
- Tiger Bell – fiddle
- Margie Cates – background vocals
- Paul Dayo – horn
- Sonny Garrish – steel guitar
- Dug Grieves – acoustic guitar
- Michael Hearne – background vocals, Spanish guitar
- Mike Hedrick – harmonica
- Melissa Hempel – background vocals
- Mark Moseley – rhythm guitar
- Mark Moseley & the Posse – background vocals
- Duncan Mullins – bass
- Robert Patin – piano
- Dow Tomlin – bass
- Hargus Robbins – piano
- Joe Spivey – fiddle
- Pete Wade – lead guitar
- Tommy Wells – drums

Technical personnel

- Casey Anderson – producer
- Liz Anderson – producer
- Mark Moseley – engineering, producer
- Lisa Sutton – artwork

== Release history ==
Region	Date	Format	Label	Ref.
United States	January 28, 2010	Compact disc	Showboat Records	
United States	January 28, 2010	Music download	Showboat Records	
