= The Bluegrass Sessions (Lynn Anderson album) =

Studio album (re-recording) by Lynn Anderson
- Released: September 14, 2004
- Recorded: 2004
- Genre: Bluegrass
- Label: DM Records
- Producer: Bil Vorn Dick

Lynn Anderson chronology
Live At Billy Bob's Texas (2001)	The Bluegrass Sessions (2004)	Cowgirl (2006)

The Bluegrass Sessions is a bluegrass album by country musician Lynn Anderson, released in 2004.

The Bluegrass Sessions contains versions of some of Anderson's biggest hits, including "(I Never Promised You a) Rose Garden", "Cry", "Top of the World", "How Can I Unlove You" and "What a Man My Man Is". The album also featured a remake of The Drifters' hit "Under the Boardwalk" and John Prine's "Paradise". The album was very well accepted by the public and critics. The album also earned Anderson a Grammy Award nomination in 2005 for "Best Bluegrass Album", her first Grammy Award nomination in over 30 years.

== Track listing ==
1. "What a Man My Man Is" – 2:51
2. "Rocky Top – 2:45
3. "How Can I Unlove You" – 3:42
4. "Rose Garden" – 3:32
5. "Paradise" – 2:53
6. "That's a No No" – 2:35
7. "Under the Boardwalk" – 3:46
8. "Ride, Ride, Ride" – 2:21
9. "If I Kiss You (Will You Go Away)" – 3:48
10. "Top of the World" – 2:42
11. "Big Girls Don't Cry" – 2:56
12. "The Worst Is Yet to Come" – 3:18
13. "Cry" – 4:27
