= Girls of the Golden West (country music duo) =

The Girls of the Golden West
- Origin: Mount Carmel, Illinois, United States
- Genres: Country music
- Years active: 1933–early 1960s
- Labels: Bluebird Records, Bluebonnet Records
- Past members: Mildred Fern Good; Dorothy Laverne Good

The Girls of the Golden West was an American female country music duo, that was popular during the "Western Era" of the 1930s and 1940s. The duo comprised two sisters, Mildred Fern Good (April 11, 1913 – May 2, 1993) and Dorothy Laverne Good (December 11, 1915 – November 12, 1967). They were born in Mount Carmel, Illinois, United States.

== Rise to fame ==
The Girls of the Golden West first entertained family and friends before they worked on a radio station in St. Louis, Missouri. In 1933, they moved to radio station WLS (AM), where they featured on program National Barn Dance, then the home of country music pioneers Gene Autry and Patsy Montana. Bradley Kincaid, also at WLS, later worked with the girls in their recordings. They first started recording for Bluebird Records in July 1933. They named themselves the Girls of the Golden West, taken from the opera by Puccini, The Girl of the Golden West. They started singing songs such as "Put My Little Shoes Away" and "Ragtime Cowboy Joe".

The Girls of the Golden West were one of the most popular acts of the 1930s and 1940s, and were one of the few women then found performing country music. The Girls also had kept up a fictitious story of their life. They would claim they were from Muleshoe, Texas, though in reality they were farming girls from the state of Illinois. However, this was all part of the image of the "Western Music" craze. They would normally wear cowgirl western-style outfits for their appearances on television programs.

== Career peak and decline ==
Girls of the Golden West were pioneers in country music at the time. There were few women then in the genre, excluding Patsy Montana, The girls would inspire a whole new breed of country music singers such as Kitty Wells, Jean Shepard and Patsy Cline. They would also inspire a short-lived girl group, The Davis Sisters. The Girls of the Golden West still remained a popular group, with other songs like "Lonesome Cowgirl" and "Silvery Moon on the Golden Gate", which became their signature tune. Later in their careers, they performed on more television shows such as Renfro Valley Barn Dance and Boone County Jamboree. Toward the end of the 1940s, their careers faded. They also later moved from WLS to WLW in Cincinnati, Ohio. After this, they occasionally performed and recorded again in 1963.

In 1967 Dorothy "Dolly" Good died, and Mildred "Millie" Good followed at the age of 80 in 1993.

== See also ==
- Western music (North America)

== Bibliography ==
- Country Music:The Rough Guide; Wolff, Kurt, Rough Guides; 1st edition (29 June 2000), ISBN 978-1858285344
