= Patsy Montana =

American country music singer-songwriter (1908–1996)

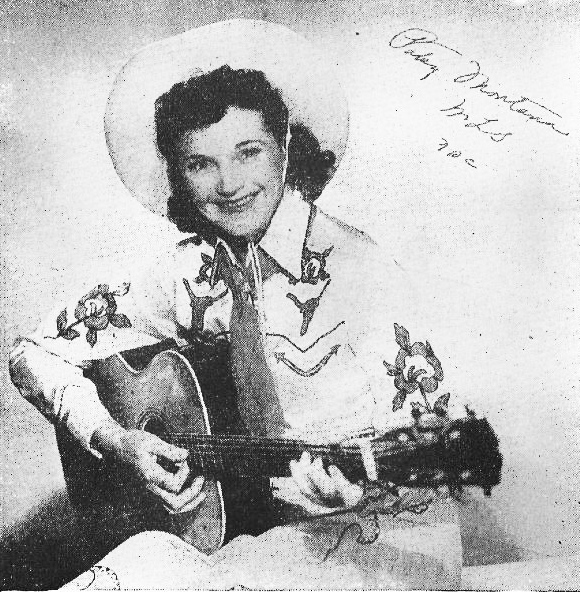

Background information
- Also known as: The Cowboy's Sweetheart
- Born: Ruby Rose Blevins; October 30, 1908; Beaudry, Arkansas, U.S.
- Died: May 3, 1996 (aged 87) San Jacinto, California, U.S.
- Genres: Country, Western
- Occupation: Singer
- Instruments: Vocals, guitar
- Years active: 1933–1996
- Labels: Vocalion, RCA Victor
- Website: Patsy Montana Site

Ruby Rose Blevins (October 30, 1908 – May 3, 1996), known professionally as Patsy Montana, was an American country and western singer and songwriter. Montana was the first female country performer to have a million-selling single with her signature song "I Want to Be a Cowboy's Sweetheart", and is a member of the Country Music Hall of Fame.

== Biography ==
Ruby Blevins (she added an "e" to Ruby in her late teens) was born in Beaudry, Arkansas, United States, and grew up near Hope. She had ten siblings, all of them boys, However, two died early from an accidental fire. She was full of sorrow, yet she tried her best to make it in life with two siblings dead.

In 1929, Blevins went to California to study violin at the University of the West (UCLA). She won a local talent contest with her singing, yodelling, and playing the guitar and first prize was an opportunity to play on the Hollywood Breakfast Club radio program.

In the summer of 1933, Blevins went with two of her brothers to the Chicago World's Fair. The trip's mission was to enter a large, prize watermelon the Blevins had raised, and Rubye was invited to go, mainly to meet up with two pen pals, Millie and Dolly Good (The Girls of the Golden West). While in Chicago, she auditioned for a crooner's role. However, she began laughing halfway through the song. The producer on hand fell in love with her "giggle" and auditioned her instead at WLS-AM for a group called the Prairie Ramblers. Blevins and the Ramblers became regulars on WLS's National Barn Dance program. The Prairie Ramblers also backed Blevins on most of her hits with ARC Records, Decca, and RCA Victor.

External audio
- “I Want to Be a Cowboy’s Sweetheart” , performed by Patsy Montana, Encyclopedia of Arkansas

In 1934, Blevins' repertoire included "Montana Plains", a reworking of a song originally called "Texas Plains". Blevins further altered the composition, which became her signature song, "I Want to Be a Cowboy's Sweetheart". Released in 1935, the song made Blevins the first female country recording artist to have a million seller. Blevins performed on National Barn Dance until the 1950s, and worked with Gene Autry, Pat Buttram, Red Foley, the Girls of the Golden West and George Gobel.

Blevins took her stage name from silent film star and world-champion roper Monte Montana, with whom she had an opportunity to work early in her career. She made one feature-length movie called Colorado Sunset with Smiley Burnette and Gene Autry.

Barn Dance also introduced her to her future husband, Paul E. Rose. Rose was a stage manager for Gene Autry at the time, and was always around when Autry was performing, which just so happened to be when Patsy was performing. According to Patsy (as she was by this time called by everyone who knew her), they were the "only two single people involved with the show and kinda got thrown together." Though Rose was around five years her junior, they married on July 3, "honeymooned," and July 4 went their separate ways on different tours. Two weeks later they were again united, but throughout their married life they often followed this pattern. The couple had two daughters, Beverly and Judy. Montana and her two daughters later appeared as the Patsy Montana Trio.

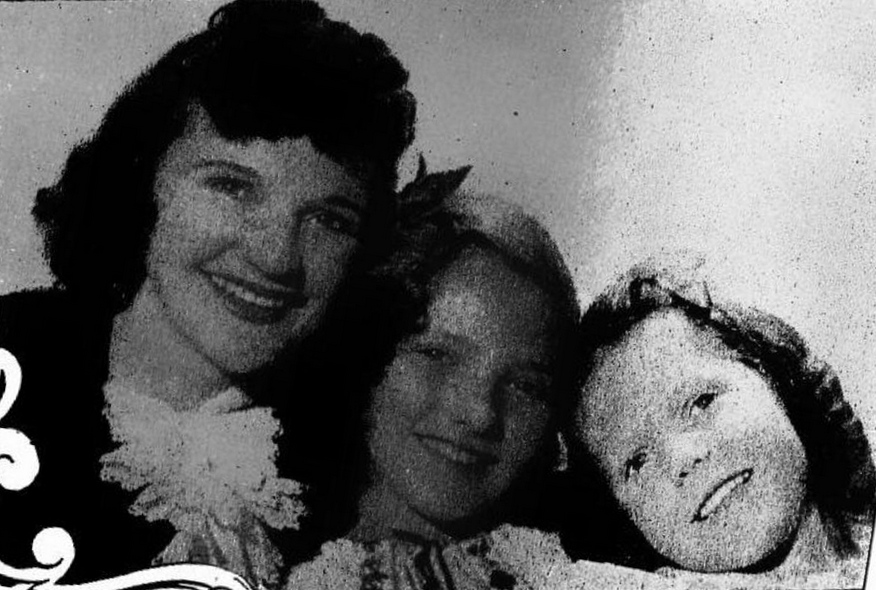
Patsy Montana with daughters Beverly and Judy

After semi-retiring in the late 1950s to spend more time with her family, Montana attempted a comeback in 1964. She released an album on the Sims label in Arizona, notable for having Waylon Jennings as lead guitar player before he made his national debut. The album was later re-released by Starday Records. She influenced later singers Patsy Cline and Dottie West, and more recently, Western music star Devon Dawson, the singing voice of Toy Story 2's Jessie the Yodeling Cowgirl.

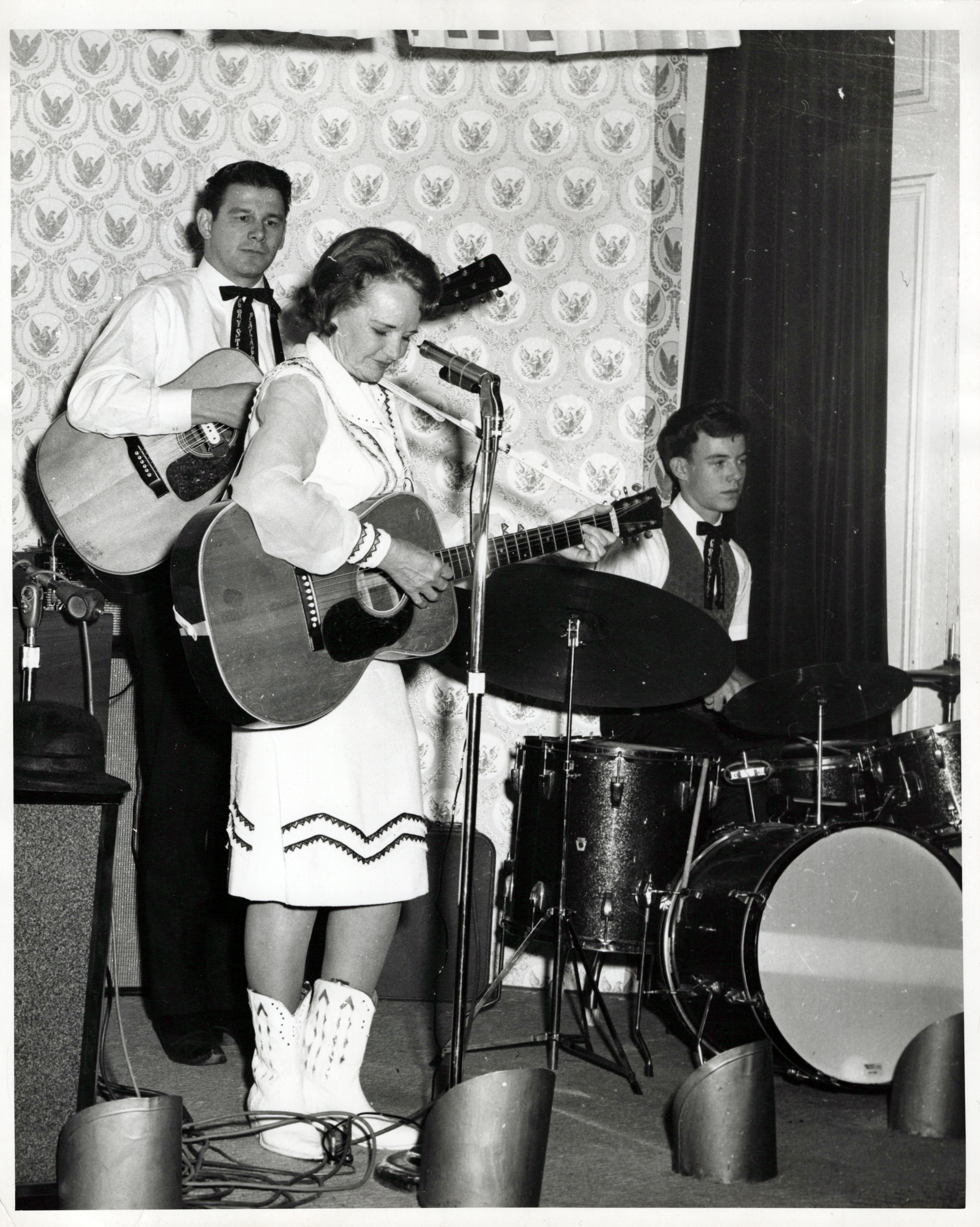
Patsy Montana at the Crystal Palace, Tombstone Arizona

Montana's signature song, "I Want to Be a Cowboy's Sweetheart", appears over the end credits of John Sayles's 1996 film Lone Star, which was released just weeks after Montana's death.

Montana died on May 3, 1996, at her home in San Jacinto, California. As Paul Rose served in the United States Army, she is buried at Riverside National Cemetery in Riverside, California. She was inducted into the National Cowgirl Museum and Hall of Fame in Fort Worth, Texas, in 1987 and in the Country Music Hall of Fame in Nashville, Tennessee, in 1996.

== Awards ==
- National Cowgirl Museum and Hall of Fame 1987
- Academy of Country Music Award: Cliffie Stone Pioneer Award 1970
- Western Music Association Hall of Fame 1989
- Cowboy Spirit Awards 1992
- Arizona Country Music Hall of Fame 1994
- Arizona Country Association pioneer awards 1993
- Country Music Hall of Fame 1996
- Arkansas Country Music Awards 2019
- Arkansas entertainers hall of fame posthumous awards 1996

== See also ==
- Western music (North America)
