= What She Does Best =

1988 album by Lynn Anderson

Studio album by Lynn Anderson
- Released: 1988
- Recorded: 1988
- Genre: Country pop
- Length: 37:59
- Label: Mercury
- Producer: Michael Clark (track 4), Jerry Kennedy (track 8), Nelson Larkin (all tracks except 4 and 8)

Lynn Anderson chronology
Back (1983)	What She Does Best (1988)	Cowboy's Sweetheart (1992)

Professional ratings
Review scores
Source	Rating
Allmusic	2/5 stars

What She Does Best is a studio album by country singer Lynn Anderson, released in 1988. It was her only album with Mercury records.

Notable due to featuring her last charting single, What She Does Best did not chart and was commercially unsuccessful. It would be her last album for four years, as Anderson went into a brief retirement and officially retired from releasing singles. The singles from this disc were "Under the Boardwalk" (a cover version of The Drifters' hit), "What He Does Best", and "How Many Hearts". "Under the Boardwalk" reached No. 24; the other singles charted far outside the Top 40. "How Many Hearts" was the last single Anderson released, and it peaked at No. 69 on the country charts in 1989.

The album's cover shows Anderson leaning on a fancy sports car, wearing a classic 1980s outfit.

== Track listing ==
1. "Under the Boardwalk"
2. "As Long as the Memory Survives"
3. "What He Does Best"
4. "Somebody's Shoulder"
5. "Martha"
6. "How Many Hearts"
7. "Take Me Like a Vacation"
8. "It Goes Without Saying"
9. "Turn the Page"
10. "Odds and Ends (Bits and Pieces)"

== Personnel ==
- Acoustic Guitar: Kenny Bell, Brent Rowan, Billy Sanford, Bruce Watkins
- Background Vocals: Lynn Anderson, Michael Bonagura, Thomas Cain, Clifford Curry, Duane Hamilton, Allan LeBeouf, Jonell Mosser, Wood Newton, Billy Joe Royal, Mervyn Warren
- Bass guitar: Larry Paxton, Bob Wray
- Dobro: Sonny Garrish
- Drums: Clyde Brooks, Jerry Kroon, Steve Turner
- Electric guitar: Steve Gibson, Brent Rowan, Dale Sellers
- Fiddle: Rob Hajacos, Bruce Watkins
- Keyboards: David Briggs, Ron Oates, Bobby Ogdin
- Lead Vocals: Lynn Anderson
- Mandolin: Rob Hajacos, Bruce Watkins
- Percussion: Jerry Kroon, Ron "Snake" Reynolds
- Steel Guitar: Sonny Garrish
