= You're My Man (album) =

Studio album by Lynn Anderson
- Released: 1971
- Recorded: 1971
- Studio: Columbia (Nashville, Tennessee)
- Genre: Country, pop
- Label: Columbia
- Producer: Glenn Sutton

Lynn Anderson chronology
Lynn Anderson with Strings (1971)	You're My Man (1971)	Lynn Anderson (1971)

You're My Man is a Lynn Anderson album for Columbia Records released in 1971. The disc was Anderson's fourth studio album for the label. The record was a #1 hit on the Billboard Top Country Albums chart for seven weeks, Anderson's third (and to date, last) number one on the chart. The album was produced by Anderson's then-husband Glenn Sutton.

The title song was Anderson's second number one record on Billboard's Hot Country Singles chart and the only single release on the LP.

== Track listing ==
1. "You're My Man" (Glenn Sutton)
2. "I Can Spot a Cheater" (Glenn Sutton, P. Tannen)
3. "I'm Gonna Write a Song" (Glenn Sutton)
4. "Cry Cry Again" (Liz Anderson, D. Lane)
5. "Knock Three Times" (Irwin Levine, L. Russell Brown)
6. "Flying Machine" (R. Jenkins)
7. "Proud Mary" (John Fogerty)
8. "Help Me Make It Through the Night" (Kris Kristofferson)
9. "Put Your Hand in the Hand" (Gene MacLellan)
10. "Joy to the World" (Hoyt Axton)
11. "I Might as Well Be Here Alone" (Glenn Sutton, F. Young)
