= How Can I Unlove You =

- Dutch release picture sleeve

Single by Lynn Anderson

from the album How Can I Unlove You
- B-side: "Don't Say Things You Don't Mean"
- Released: August 1971
- Recorded: 1971
- Genre: Countrypolitan, country
- Length: 2:49
- Label: Columbia
- Songwriter: Joe South
- Producer: Glenn Sutton

Lynn Anderson singles chronology
"You're My Man" (1971)	"How Can I Unlove You" (1971)	"Cry" (1972)

"How Can I Unlove You" is a song written by Joe South and recorded by Lynn Anderson country music singer Lynn Anderson, released in 1971. The song was produced by Anderson's then-husband, Glenn Sutton. It was nominated for Best Country Vocal Performance, Female at the 1971 Grammy Awards.

== Chart performance ==
"How Can I Unlove You", was released as a single in August 1971, shortly after her previous hit, "You're My Man", peaked at No. 1 on the country charts, where it spent three weeks at the top. Anderson had recently enjoyed what would ultimately be the biggest hit of her career, "(I Never Promised You a) Rose Garden", in February 1971. "How Can I Unlove You" reached No. 63 on the Pop charts, the same position as her previous No. 1 country hit, "You're My Man".

Chart (1971)	Peak position
U.S. Billboard Hot Country Singles	1
U.S. Billboard Hot 100	63
U.S. Billboard Hot Adult Contemporary Tracks	30
Canadian RPM Country Tracks	1
Canadian RPM Top Singles	42
Canadian RPM Adult Contemporary Tracks	14

== Re-recording ==
- A bluegrass version of the song was recorded by Anderson for her Grammy-nominated 2004 album, The Bluegrass Sessions.
