= Platinum Entertainment =

- Founded: 1991
- Founder: Steve Devick
- Defunct: 2001
- Status: Liquidated
- Location: Downer's Grove, Illinois

Platinum Entertainment was an American record label that operated in the 1990s.

The company was founded by Steve Devick in 1991, who reorganized his River North Studios recording studio into a record label. The company initially sold primarily gospel music, but diversified into other genres, primarily by signing older but still active acts instead of developing new artists.

In 1994, Platinum acquired Diadem, a label active in the Christian music industry, and purchased Intersound Records in 1996.

By 1997, the company's revenue was estimated to be $130 million annually. However, by the turn of the century Platinum had begun to lose money—its first quarter financial report in 2000 showed that the company had lost $3.9 million in the quarter and had just $3,000 in cash. The company closed its distribution subsidiary in June, but was nevertheless forced to declare bankruptcy in July, with liabilities of $52.1 million against assets of $15.7 million. Martin Tudor, a former Intersound executive, reorganized some Platinum assets into a new label named Compendia Music Group.
