= Keep Me in Mind (Lynn Anderson song) =

"Keep Me In Mind"
- German release picture sleeve

Single by Lynn Anderson

from the album Keep Me In Mind
- B-side: "Rodeo Cowboy"
- Released: January 1973
- Recorded: 1972
- Genre: Countrypolitan
- Length: 2:58
- Label: Columbia
- Songwriters: George Richey, Glenn Sutton
- Producer: Glenn Sutton

Lynn Anderson singles chronology
"Fool Me" (1972)	"Keep Me In Mind" (1973)	"Top of the World" (1973)

"Keep Me in Mind" was a No. 1 country hit for vocalist Lynn Anderson in 1973, and the title of an album released the same year.

== Chart performance ==
Chart (1973)	Peak position
U.S. Billboard Hot Country Singles	1
U.S. Billboard Bubbling Under Hot 100	4
Canadian RPM Country Tracks	1
