= Lynn Anderson =

American country music singer (1947–2015)

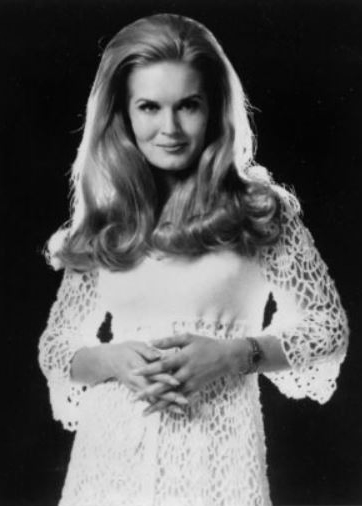
- Anderson in 1970
- Born: Lynn René Anderson; September 26, 1947; Grand Forks, North Dakota, U.S.
- Died: July 30, 2015 (aged 67); Nashville, Tennessee, U.S.
- Occupations: Singer; television personality; equestrian
- Years active: 1966–2015
- Spouses: Glenn Sutton (m. 1968; div. 1977); Harold "Spook" Stream (m. 1978; div. 1982)
- Partner: Mentor Williams (1989–2015)
- Children: 3
- Mother: Liz Anderson
- Musical career
- Genres: Country; countrypolitan; western; bluegrass; gospel
- Instrument: Vocals
- Labels: Chart; Columbia; Permian; MCA; Mercury; Laserlight; Intersound; Smith; Showboat; Center Sound
- Website: lynnandersonrosegarden.com

Lynn René Anderson (September 26, 1947 – July 30, 2015) was an American country singer and television personality. Her crossover signature recording, "Rose Garden", was a number one hit internationally. She also charted five number one and 18 top-ten singles on the Billboard country songs chart. Anderson is regarded as one of country music's most significant performers.

Born in Grand Forks, North Dakota, United States, she was raised in California by her mother, Liz Anderson, who was also a country music artist. Daughter Lynn was signed to a recording contract to Chart Records in 1966 after she was heard singing along with her mother at an industry function. Previously she had recorded some demo tapes of her mother's songs and appeared on television in California on regional country music shows. In 1967, she had her first top ten hit with the single "If I Kiss You (Will You Go Away)". Soon after, Anderson joined the cast of The Lawrence Welk Show, where she performed country music weekly to a national audience.

In 1970, Anderson signed with Columbia Records, where she was produced by her first husband, Glenn Sutton. She had her biggest commercial success with "Rose Garden". The song reached positions on the Billboard country, pop, and adult contemporary charts, also charting in the Top-5 in 15 other countries and earning her a Grammy Award for Best Female Country Vocal Performance. Throughout the decade, Anderson also had number-one hits with "You're My Man", "How Can I Unlove You", "Keep Me in Mind", and "What a Man My Man Is". She also became a television personality, with appearances on The Tonight Show, specials with Bob Hope and Dean Martin, and her own prime-time specials.

After a brief hiatus, Anderson returned with the studio album Back (1983). The album spawned three singles, including the top ten hit "You're Welcome to Tonight", with Gary Morris. She continued recording sporadically throughout the 1980s. This included a revival of the pop hit "Under the Boardwalk" and the studio album What She Does Best (1988). Anderson continued releasing new albums into the new millennium, such as 2004's The Bluegrass Sessions. Towards the end of her life, Anderson struggled with alcohol addiction, but continued performing until her death in 2015. For her work as a crossover artist, she was ranked on Rolling Stone's list of the "100 Greatest Country Artists of All Time" and CMTs "40 Greatest Women of Country Music".

== Early life ==
Lynn Rene Anderson was born in Grand Forks, North Dakota, on September 26, 1947, to Casey and Liz Anderson. Her grandparents were Scandinavian immigrants who established a North Dakota "saddle club". According to Anderson, she could ride horses before she could walk. While she was still a young child, the family relocated to a subdivision in Fair Oaks, California.

However, Anderson insisted that her parents move to a ranch, prompting the family to move to Sacramento, California. In Sacramento, the Andersons bought a ranch with two acres of land. The family raised horses, which she learned how to ride and care for. At the age of 9, Anderson won second place at a local horse-racing event in San Francisco, California. Lynn also became interested in performing from an early age. Both her parents were aspiring songwriters who had formed friendships with west country performers. Her performing and musical interests continued into high school. During her teens she landed a job working as a secretary for KROY in Sacramento. Upon graduating, she became the station's secretary to the general manager.

While working full-time, Lynn continued entering equestrian competitions. Once winning several competitions, she was dubbed the "California Horse Show Queen" in 1966. While watching her daughter at these events, Liz Anderson was also composing songs. She sent her compositions to Los Angeles and Nashville, Tennessee, where they were heard by music executives. Among the songs heard was "(My Friends Are Gonna Be) Strangers", which was recorded by Merle Haggard in 1964. The song led producer Chet Atkins to sign Liz to a recording contract at RCA Victor. This prompted the family to relocate to Nashville. Before officially moving, Liz took a brief trip with her daughter to Nashville in 1965. At a hotel, mother and daughter performed in an informal sing-along with several other artists. Also present at the sing-along was producer Slim Williamson. Impressed by her vocals, Williamson offered Lynn a recording contract of her own. In 1966, she signed her first recording contract with Chart Records.

== Music career ==
=== 1966–1969: Early country success and The Lawrence Welk Show ===
During a car ride, Liz Anderson composed a song titled "Ride, Ride, Ride". Her daughter liked the song and had an interest in cutting it at her new label. It was cut at her first recording session. Although her debut single was 1966's "In Person", it was "Ride, Ride, Ride" that became Anderson's first charting single. Her next release was another Liz Anderson composition, "If I Kiss You (Will You Go Away)". It was Anderson's first major hit as a music artist, reaching number five on the Billboard Hot Country Singles chart in 1967. Her debut studio album of the same name was also released in 1967 and peaked at number 25 on the Billboard Top Country Albums chart. She followed it with "Promises, Promises", which reached number four on the country singles list in February 1968. Her second studio release of the same name reached number one on the country albums chart.

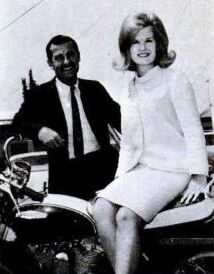
Anderson with radio disc jockeys, 1967

When reviewing her 1999 Chart compilation, Greg Adams of AllMusic gave the recording four-and-a-half out of five stars. "Lynn Anderson made some of the best music of her career during her late-'60s period on the Chart label", Adams commented. Billboard magazine also praised these early recordings. In reviewing Big Girls Don't Cry, writers took note of her mass appeal. "The material which includes her fine renditions of 'Honey' and 'Ring of Fire' is diversified and has appeal for all buyers", they wrote.

In 1967, Anderson's career gained further momentum when she was cast on The Lawrence Welk Show. Welk's son, Larry Welk, discovered an Anderson album cover and was drawn to her physicality. Larry's interest drew Lawrence Welk to audition and eventually cast her. Anderson became the show's first country performer and toured with the cast nationwide. However, she was dissatisfied with the material chosen for her to sing on the program and threatened to quit. After meeting with Welk, different arrangements were made for Anderson's performances. The exposure led to continued music success. In 1967, she won the "Top Female Vocalist" award at the Academy of Country Music Awards. She remained with The Lawrence Welk Show until 1968.

While finding chart success and common ground with Welk, Anderson was not finding common ground with the Nashville establishment. "I was seen as a kid from California on the Welk show – not a real country artist", she stated. Thus, she chose to record more traditional material that would help associate her with Nashville's country music scene. Among these songs was a cover of the Osborne Brothers' "Rocky Top". Anderson's version became a bigger hit than the original, climbing to number 17 on the Billboard country singles list in 1970. She had country hits between 1968 and 1969 that further displayed a traditional country style, including "Big Girls Don't Cry", "That's a No No" and a cover of Hank Snow's "I've Been Everywhere". Anderson's sixth studio album was a tribute to the traditional female country performers that preceded her. Titled Songs That Made Country Girls Famous (1969), the album reached number nine on the country albums chart.

=== 1970–1980: "Rose Garden" and breakthrough ===
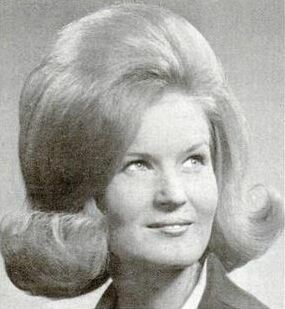
Anderson in Billboard magazine, 1971

In 1970, Anderson's recording contract was bought by Columbia Records and she began recording for the new label that year. Two years prior, she married songwriter and producer Glenn Sutton, who ultimately became her producer at the label. Her first Columbia release was the Sutton-penned "Stay There, Till I Get There". The song became her fifth top ten hit on the Billboard Hot Country Singles chart, rising to number seven in 1970. Her eighth studio album of the same name was also released in 1970. According to writer Greg Adams, the album resembled the traditional country of her previous Chart recordings. Despite the success of Sutton's composition, Anderson claimed that it was hard for Sutton to provide additional material for her. His collaborator, Billy Sherrill, oversaw Sutton and chose many of his compositions for Tammy Wynette to record. "Glenn was very politically connected at Columbia and Epic...so I had to find songs from other sources, which is why a lot of my songs were written by other people", she commented in 2011.

"Rose Garden"
Anderson's signature song and a major crossover pop hit of the 1970s. (1970).

According to Anderson, she had found the original version of "Rose Garden" on "a Joe South album and loved it." She then brought it to the attention of Glenn Sutton. However, Sutton was against recording it because lines in the song were sung from a male perspective. However, he eventually acceded to Anderson after she kept bringing the song into recording sessions. Released as a single in October 1970, the song became Anderson's first number one single, topping the charts for five weeks. It was also her first to crossover onto the Billboard Hot 100, peaking at number three in February 1971. The song was an international hit, reaching the Top-5 in 15 other countries. Its crossover success helped Anderson receive accolades from 13th Annual Grammy Awards, the Academy of Country Music and the Country Music Association. Anderson's eleventh studio album, Rose Garden, was released in December 1970. The record topped the Billboard country albums chart and spent 77 weeks on the survey altogether. It was also her highest-peaking album on the Billboard 200 chart list, reaching number 19. The record certified platinum in sales from the Recording Industry Association of America.

Anderson followed "Rose Garden" with the singles "You're My Man" and "How Can I Unlove You", which both became number one hits on the Billboard country songs chart in 1971. Both songs also registered on the Billboard adult contemporary chart, with "You're My Man" becoming a top ten hit on that survey. The latter singles appeared on corresponding studio releases. This begun with You're My Man, which reached the top spot on the country albums list. The project also peaked at number 99 on the Billboard 200. Allmusic gave the album four out of five stars, praising the album's pop covers of "Knock Three Times" and "Proud Mary". Her twelfth studio album was also titled How Can I Unlove You. It featured covers of "Take Me Home Country Roads" and "You've Got a Friend". The record peaked at number two on the country albums chart and number 132 on the Billboard 200.

She continued to diversify her music by recording songs of different styles. In 1972, Anderson recorded Johnnie Ray's pop hit "Cry", which became a top five country hit for Anderson. She also reached the top five with a version of Loggins and Messina's "Listen to a Country Song" and Joe South's "Fool Me". She then covered The Carpenters' "Top of the World" after hearing it on their 1972 album, A Song for You. Anderson's version reached number two on the Billboard country songs chart. After discovering that Anderson's version had become a hit, The Carpenters released their own version for the pop market.

In the 21st century, critics have taken notice of Anderson's various music styles. Writers Mary A. Bufwack and Robert K. Oermann commented that her diverse song subjects proved that she could be "poignant" and "downhearted". Greg Adams of Allmusic thought that albums such as 1972's Cry had an easy listening style that made her music more marketable to different genres.

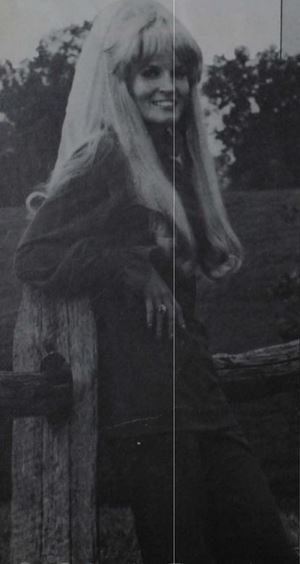
Anderson in Billboard magazine, 1972

Between 1973 and 1974, the singles "Keep Me in Mind" and "What a Man My Man Is" reached number one. Anderson's success was also fueled by television appearances, especially during the second half of the decade. She appeared on prime-time shows The Brady Bunch Hour, The Tonight Show and The Midnight Special. Additionally, she collaborated with Dean Martin and Bob Hope on television and in concert. Anderson hosted her own CBS television special in 1977. Regular television appearances helped promote singles that were less successful. This included a one-episode appearance on Starsky and Hutch, where Anderson performed her 1977 single "Wrap Your Love All Around Your Man". After her performance, the song reached number 12 on the Billboard country singles chart. She had further top twenty country hits in the middle decade with "He Turns It into Love Again", "I've Never Loved Anyone More", and "All the King's Horses". With declining chart success, Anderson adopted a newer image which was described by writers as "racy" and "skin tight". The new style proved successful when she returned in 1979 with Karla Bonoff's "Isn't It Always Love". Anderson's version reached the top ten of the country charts. Its success led to her 1979 album reaching the top 30 of the Billboard country albums chart. In 1980, Anderson released her last studio album for Columbia Records called Even Cowgirls Get the Blues. It produced two top 30 country singles, including the title track, which reached number 26.

=== 1982–1989: Hiatus and comeback ===
In 1980, Anderson left Columbia Records after remarrying two years prior. Prior to her departure, it was claimed that Columbia intended to promote her as the company's answer to counterparts, Barbara Mandrell and Dolly Parton. Instead, Anderson moved to Louisiana with her second husband and raised a family. With the exception of an album of re-recordings, she did not record for nearly three years. In 1982, Anderson and Harold Stream divorced. She returned to Nashville that same year and began working with former CBS agent Bonnie Garner. In 1983, Garner helped her secure a new recording contract with the independent label Permian Records.

In 1983, she released her 29th studio album, Back, on Permian. Writers Mary A. Bufwack and Robert K. Oermann called the album's music "emotional" and "bruised". "That's what I felt at the time", Anderson recalled of the album's choice of material. Back was her last charting record, peaking at number 61 on the Billboard Top Country Albums list in 1983. Two singles were spawned that became major hits. The first was "What I Learned from Loving You", a top twenty hit on the Hot Country Songs chart. The second was a duet with Gary Morris called "You're Welcome to Tonight". It was Anderson's first top ten hit in five years, reaching number nine in 1984.

In 1986, Permian Records filed for bankruptcy. Although the label focused on artist management and production, it dropped all of its major artists, including Anderson. During this period Anderson did not release full-length albums, but did record a single for MCA Records. Titled "Heart of the Matter," the track did not chart. She then signed with Mercury Records in the second half of the decade. In 1988, her cover of The Drifters' "Under the Boardwalk" became her highest-charting single in five years, peaking at number 24 on the Billboard country songs chart. Her 30th studio album, What She Does Best, was issued on Mercury in 1988. The record's title track was also spawned as a single and became a minor hit in 1988. The album's third (and final) single, "How Many Hearts", was Anderson's last chart appearance in her career. In March 1989, it peaked at number 69 on the Billboard country songs chart.

=== 1990–2015: New musical directions ===
Anderson left the major label market following her departure from Mercury in 1990. She began to diversify her career during this time. In 1990, she appeared on the BBC Scotland drama The Wreck on the Highway. She also recorded a variety of different musical genres. In 1992, she released the studio album Cowboy's Sweetheart on the independent Laserlight label. The project was western-themed and included collaborations with Emmylou Harris and Marty Stuart. Allmusic's Jason Ankeny gave the album 2.5 out of 5 stars, yet called it one of her "stronger albums". In 1992, Billboard gave the album a positive response. "Anderson has never sounded better or more alluring than she does in this collection built around a western/living free motif", staff writers noted. Six years later, Anderson released the Platinum Entertainment studio project, Latest and Greatest. The album included re-recordings of her hits, and also featured three new tracks. Two of the album's track were composed by Anderson's partner, Mentor Williams. In their review, Allmusic commented that she no longer had her "girlish" edge, but rather a voice comparable to that of K.T. Oslin or Mary Chapin Carpenter.

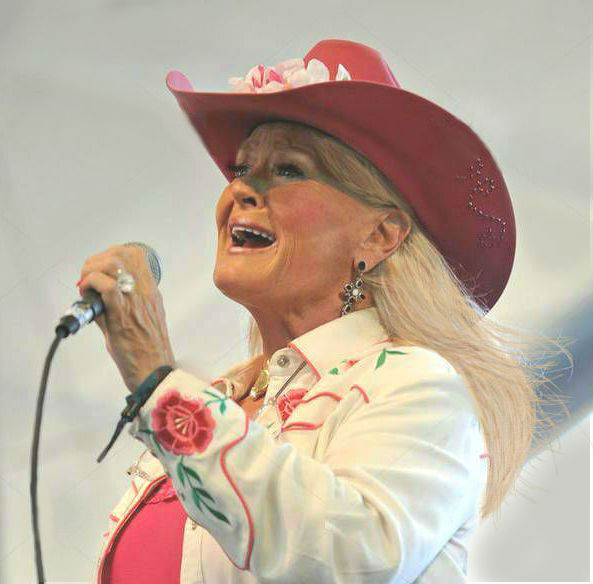
Anderson in concert, 2010

In 2000, Anderson released her first live record titled Live at Billy Bob's Texas, which was issued on the Smith label. Richie Unterberger of Allmusic gave the effort three out of five stars in his review, commenting, "This disc is not an electrifying find, but it's decent for what it is." In June 2005, Anderson's 34th studio album, The Bluegrass Sessions was issued on the DM label. The album was a collection of Anderson's former hits recorded in a bluegrass style. The track listing included hits such as "Rose Garden", "You're My Man", and "Rocky Top". Zac Johnson of Allmusic gave the release 2.5 out of 5 possible stars. Johnson questioned her authenticity when reviewing the record, noting that some songs sounded "a little forced". Despite the critical response, The Bluegrass Sessions was nominated by the Grammy Awards for Best Bluegrass Album.

Over the next several years, Anderson continued touring and performing as well. In 2007, Anderson was part of the lineup at the CMA Music Festival at the Riverfront Park. Other performers included Terri Clark and Lorrie Morgan. In 2009, she performed at the Stagecoach Festival, which also included additional performers. Between 2010 and 2011, she performed alongside the Metropole Symphony Orchestra for a series of concerts. Anderson also continued recording music. In 2006, she released her 35th studio album, Cowgirl. The album was a collection of western songs, which were written (or co-written) with her mother. The project was released on her mother's label, Showboat Records. A similar project was issued in 2010 titled Cowgirl II on the same label. According to Anderson, her reasons for releasing both western albums was to present the genre in a "sophisticated way" for people who did not know the music.

In June 2015, Anderson released her final studio album Bridges. The album was a collection of gospel material that included collaborations with The Martins and The Oak Ridge Boys. According to a 2015 interview with Anderson, it was her first album in ten years that she decided to promote. It was also Anderson's first gospel collection and featured a reworking of Dobie Gray's "Drift Away" for the Christian market. Writer Timothy Yap called the album's songwriting "top notch" in his review of the album. Markos Papadatos of the Digital Journal gave it 4.5 out of 5 stars, calling the record "phenomenal". The album was released a month prior to her death in July 2015.

== Equestrian career ==
In addition to her music career, Anderson was also an equestrian and professional horse racer. While she had equestrian credits before signing her first recording contract, Anderson continued pursuing it throughout her life. Over the course of her life, Anderson had won 16 national championships, eight world championships and some celebrity championships.

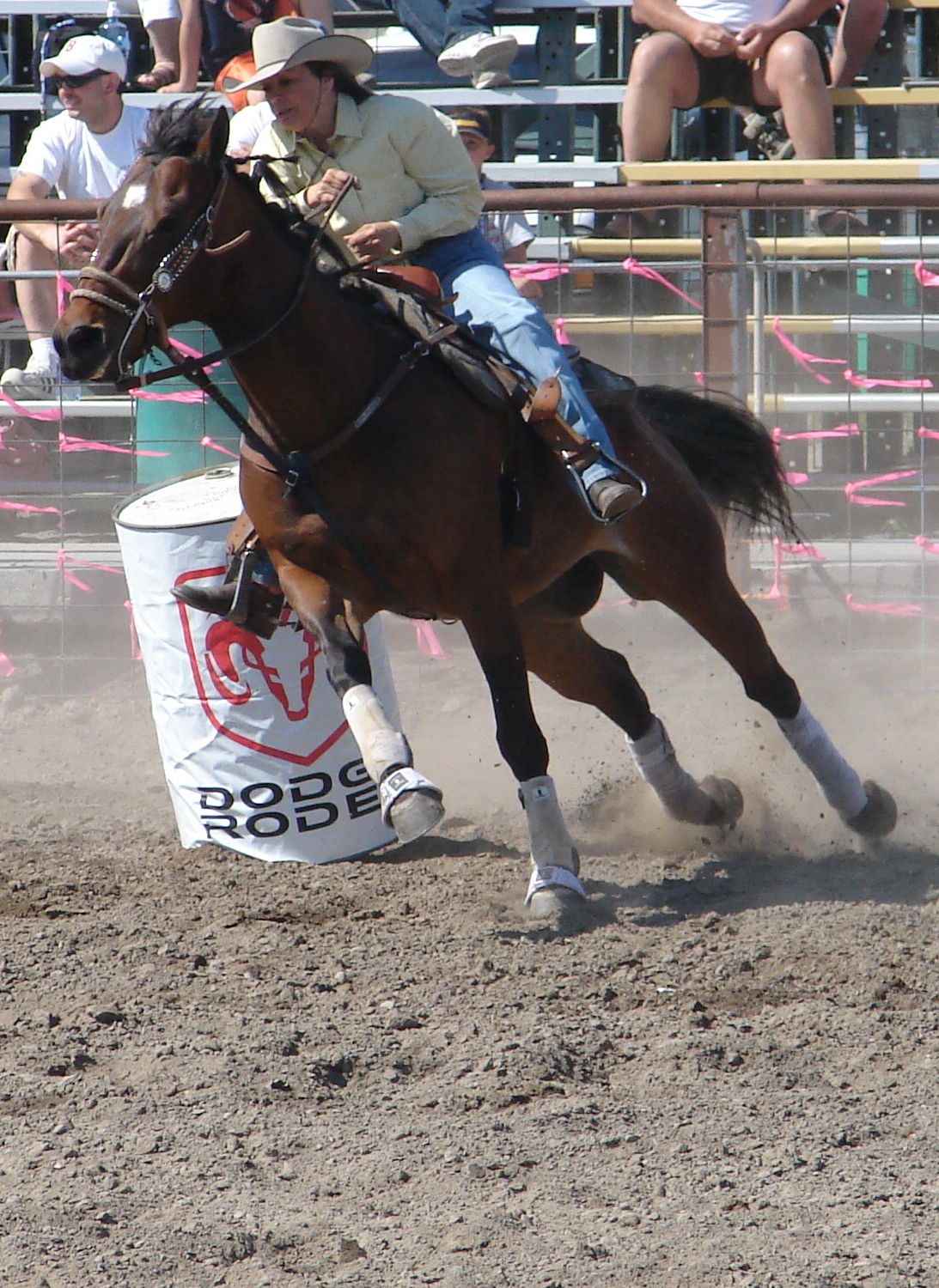
Anderson raced and bred quarter horses, similar to the one pictured

She often alternated between performing music concerts and participating in horse shows. "I'd go sing at a concert, then fly to a horse show, then fly back the next night for a concert. I was real serious about showing horses", she recounted. Anderson also bred horses, most notably quarter horses. Among her bred horses, Doc Starlight, helped start a bloodline for cutting horses in the United States. She was a lifelong member of the American Quarter Horse Association and participated in a variety of the organization's events. While she participated in many events, the cutting horse events were considered her favorites.

Anderson kept show horses in Texas during the final years of her life. She also employed a horse trainer to keep the animals active and ready for competitions. Anderson traveled between Texas and her home in New Mexico to spend time with the horses. She also raised horses at her ranch in New Mexico. In a 1995 interview, Anderson told reporter Gene Stout that she mainly moved to New Mexico so that she could raise horses. "I’ve been kind of a cowgirl most of my life, so New Mexico is the perfect place for me. It suits me very well. Ninety percent of the time I’m in cowboy boots and a cowboy hat", she recounted.

Anderson worked with disabled children and facilitated in learning to ride horses. She helped establish a horse riding organization in Franklin, Tennessee called "Special Riders". Anderson was inspired to establish the organization after observing a child who had crutches and was unable to ride. Anderson also collaborated with a similar program in Texas called "Rocky Top Riders". Although not started by Anderson, the program was named for her 1970 country hit. She also established a clinic to help aspiring young female riders. Entitled "Rodeo Queen", the clinic focused on horse show activities, such as horse grooming and self-care. She also worked with the North American Riding for the Handicapped Association (NARHA) for several years.

== Personal life ==
=== Marriages, relationships and family ===
Anderson was married twice and had three children. Her first marriage to Glenn Sutton lasted from 1968 until 1977. The pair met after Sutton developed an interest in producing her music while at the Chart label. Anderson stated that she had turned down several professional opportunities due to Sutton's disapproval. This included touring in Vietnam with Bob Hope and acting in the film W.W. and the Dixie Dancekings. The pair continued collaborating musically until they divorced in 1977. The couple had one child together, Lisa Sutton.

In 1978, Anderson married Louisiana oilman and entrepreneur Harold "Spook" Stream. She had met Stream at a rodeo event and developed a romantic relationship shortly afterward. The couple had two children together and divorced in 1982. Anderson claimed that Stream had been physically abusive, stating that he had attempted to run her over with a vehicle and tried to hit her. Following their divorce, Anderson and Stream fought over custody of their two children. Although attempting to gain visitation rights, Anderson ultimately lost custody of the children.

Anderson reconnected with songwriter Mentor Williams following her divorce. The pair reunited at a Nashville press event, and the relationship turned romantic in 1989. The two later moved to a ranch in Taos, New Mexico, the home state of Williams. Anderson and Williams lived in New Mexico until her death in 2015. They never married but remained in a committed relationship. "He’s technically my boyfriend, but really he’s like my husband", Anderson said in 2013.

=== Legal issues ===
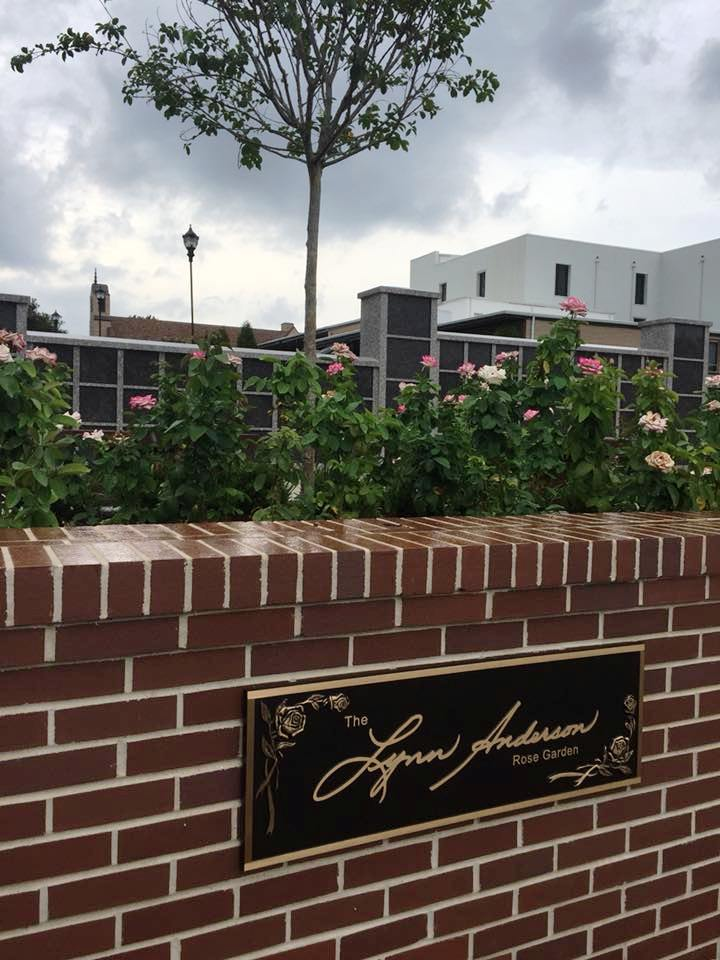
Anderson's memorial, located in Nashville's Woodlawn Memorial Park cemetery

Anderson had issues with alcohol towards the end of her life. In December 2004, she was arrested and charged with driving under the influence in Denton, Texas. A driver following Anderson called the police after noticing her car weaving in and out of lanes. After failing a field sobriety test, she was arrested and released on a $1000 bond. On January 24, 2005, Anderson was accused of shoplifting a Harry Potter DVD from a local supermarket in Taos, New Mexico. Upon her arrest she punched the arresting officer. She was charged with shoplifting, resisting arrest and assault on a police officer. The assault charges were later dropped. The shoplifting charge was dropped following Anderson's agreement not to commit any further offenses.

In May 2006, Anderson was arrested on a second DUI charge after a traffic accident near Española, New Mexico. According to police, Anderson failed a sobriety test and refused to take a breathalyzer test after her car hit the back of another car. No one was injured in the collision and she again was charged and released on bond. Her last arrest occurred on September 11, 2014, after being involved in a minor traffic accident in Nashville, Tennessee, on West End Avenue. Anderson was arrested after she admitted to drinking alcohol and taking prescription medication. She was booked on DUI and released on a $5,000 bond. She issued a statement and apologized to her fans. Anderson later went through rehabilitation at the Betty Ford Center.

=== Death ===
Anderson died on July 30, 2015, at the Vanderbilt University Medical Center in Nashville, Tennessee, at the age of 67. She had been briefly hospitalized due to pneumonia after vacationing in Italy. The official cause of death was a heart attack. At her funeral, her friend Brenda Lee gave a speech, and several doves were released to commemorate her death.

Anderson is interred in the mausoleum of Nashville's Woodlawn Memorial Park cemetery near her mother, Liz, who died in 2011. Her father, Casey, died in 2018 and was interred next to his wife. That same year, the cemetery (referred to as the "Cemetery of Country Stars") created the Lynn Anderson Rose Garden. Consisting of some 200 Lynn Anderson Hybrid Rose Bushes named for the singer by the National Rose Society of America, it is a place of reflection and meditation in honor of her signature song.

== Musical styles ==
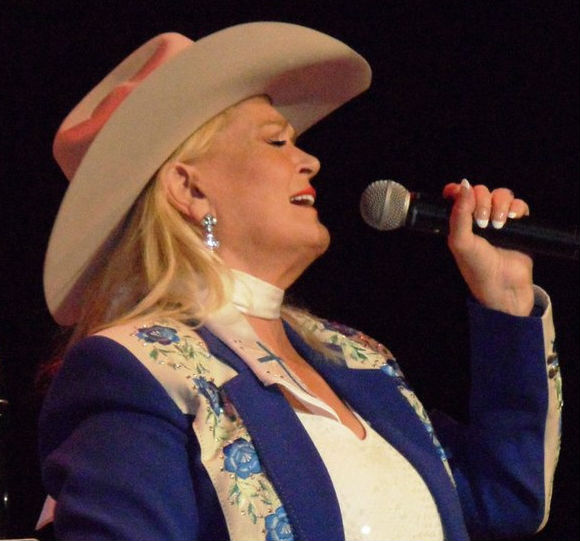
Anderson in concert, 2011

Anderson's music is rooted in the country genre. It is also rooted in the sub-genres of the Nashville Sound, countrypolitan, bluegrass, western and gospel. Early on, Anderson had a traditional country style that featured instruments such as the steel guitar and the banjo. These recordings also incorporated some elements of the Nashville Sound style. Her style shifted after working alongside Glenn Sutton, who helped develop Anderson's music towards the Countrypolitan format by combining soft rock and adult contemporary. This was first seen on her 1970 studio album, No Love at All. Reviewer Pemberton Roach said the album exemplified the style through its emotional lyrics and mature vocal stylings. It was most apparent in "Rose Garden", which writer Richard Carlin called a "poppy, upbeat song" with rock accompaniment.

As Anderson's music routinely crossed over into the pop field, it developed into adult contemporary and pop music. Anderson recorded covers of pop hits for her studio releases during the 1970s. In his review of her 1972 album, Greg Adams commented on her shift: "Cry continues Lynn Anderson's trend toward pop music and away from songs written by her gifted mother, Liz Anderson." Stephen Thomas Erlewine noted a similar trend in his review of her 2017 album, The Definitive Collection: "[It] winds up with a narrative, illustrating how Anderson drifted from the Nashville sound to easy listening by the end of the '70s, and by telling that story, this double disc lives up to its title's promise". Anderson's singing voice has also been highlighted by writers and journalists. David Laing of The Guardian described her as having a "powerful alto voice." Steve Huey of Allmusic called Anderson's voice "sweet but strong" in his biography of her career.

== Legacy, honours and achievements ==
Anderson has been widely regarded as one of country music's most significant female artists. According to Mary A. Bufwack and Robert K. Oermann, Anderson brought female artists to a new level in the 1970s. Steve Huey of Allmusic called her "one of the most popular female country singers of the early '70s". Courtney Campbell of Wide Open Country called her "one of the most important female country music voices of her time". At the time of her death, other country artists acknowledged her as a career inspiration, most notably Neal McCoy, Martina McBride and Mary Sarah. Reba McEntire also saw Anderson as a musical inspiration: "I am a huge fan of Lynn’s. She was always so nice to me. She did so much for the females in country music. Always continuing to pave the road for those to follow."

Writers and music journalists have most notably regarded Anderson as an important crossover music artist. In his book Historical Dictionary of Popular Music, author Norman Abjorensen viewed her as an artist that "took aim at the mainstream pop audience". Bufwack and Oermann noted that Anderson's "Rose Garden" helped set the trend for female crossover artists in the 1970s. Her crossover legacy has also been recognized for her national television appearances. In 2015, The Washington Post explained that Anderson was the first female country artist to appear on national television due to cast membership on The Lawrence Welk Show. Courtney Campbell of Wide Open Country noted that she was the first female country performer to appear on The Tonight Show and headline at Madison Square Garden in New York City.

Anderson has also been given honors and achievements as part of her legacy. Record World named her their "Artist of the Decade" between 1970 and 1980. In the mid-1990s, a hybrid tea rose was created called "The Lynn Anderson Rose". In 1999, Governor Don Sundquist of Tennessee made June 15 "Lynn Anderson Day" in the state. She was also inducted into the North American Country Music Association Hall of Fame the same year.

In 2002, she was ranked by Country Music Television on their list of the "40 Greatest Women of Country Music". She received a similar recognition when Rolling Stone included her on their list of the "100 Greatest Country Artists of All Time". In 2017, her stage costumes and memorabilia were on display at the Country Music Hall of Fame and Museum. The Anderson exhibit was called "Keep Me in Mind". The exhibit ran through 2018. In 2018, daughter Lisa Sutton helped open the Lynn Anderson Rose Garden in Nashville to pay tribute to her career. In 2019, she was inducted into the Western Music Association Hall of Fame. In 2020, Anderson was featured in the PBS documentary "Iconic Women of Country". Female country artists, including Trisha Yearwood, discussed her legacy in the genre. The same year, Anderson's eleventh studio album, Rose Garden, was remastered for its 50th anniversary. The new edition included liner notes from Clive Davis and Reba McEntire.

== Discography ==
Studio albums

- 1967: Ride, Ride, Ride
- 1967: Promises, Promises
- 1968: Big Girls Don't Cry
- 1969: With Love, from Lynn
- 1969: At Home with Lynn
- 1969: Songs That Made Country Girls Famous
- 1970: Uptown Country Girl
- 1970: Stay There 'Til I Get There
- 1970: No Love at All
- 1970: I'm Alright
- 1970: Rose Garden
- 1971: You're My Man
- 1971: How Can I Unlove You
- 1971: The Christmas Album
- 1972: Cry
- 1972: Listen to a Country Song
- 1973: Keep Me in Mind
- 1973: Top of the World
- 1974: Smile for Me
- 1974: What a Man My Man Is
- 1975: I've Never Loved Anyone More
- 1976: All the King's Horses
- 1977: I Love What Love Is Doing to Me/He Ain't You
- 1977: Wrap Your Love All Around Your Man
- 1978: From the Inside
- 1979: Outlaw Is Just a State of Mind
- 1980: Even Cowgirls Get the Blues
- 1982: The Best of Lynn Anderson: Memories and Desires
- 1983: Back
- 1988: What She Does Best
- 1992: Cowboy's Sweetheart
- 1998: Latest and Greatest
- 1999: Home for the Holidays
- 2005: The Bluegrass Sessions
- 2006: Cowgirl
- 2010: Cowgirl II
- 2015: Bridges

== Filmography ==
Title	Year	Role	Notes	Ref.
The Lawrence Welk Show	1967–68	Herself		
Tennessee Ernie Ford's White Christmas	1972	Herself	television special	
The Dean Martin Show	1972–74	Herself		
Dean Martin Presents Music Country	1973	Herself		
The Bobby Vinton Show	1976	Herself		
Dolly	1976	Herself		
Hollywood Squares	1976–79	Herself		
The Brady Bunch Hour	1977	Herself		
The Lynn Anderson Special	1977	Herself	television special	
Starsky & Hutch	1977	Sue Ann Grainger		
The Wreck on the Highway	1990	Betsy Hall		

== Awards ==
Anderson received many awards during the course of her career. This includes two from the Academy of Country Music, one from the Country Music Association and one from the Grammy Awards.
