= Rose Garden (song) =

Song first recorded by Billy Joe Royal

"(I Never Promised You a) Rose Garden"

Song by Billy Joe Royal

from the album Billy Joe Royal featuring Hush
- Released: November 1967
- Recorded: July 1967
- Genre: Country; pop soul
- Length: 2:25
- Label: Columbia
- Songwriter: Joe South
- Producer: Joe South

Official audio
- "I Never Promised You a Rose Garden" on YouTube

"Rose Garden" (sometimes titled "(I Never Promised You A) Rose Garden") is a song written in 1967 by American singer-songwriter Joe South. It was first recorded by Billy Joe Royal on his 1967 studio album Billy Joe Royal Featuring Hush. Versions by South himself and Dobie Gray appeared shortly after the original. Gray's version became a minor hit in North America in 1969.

In 1970, Lynn Anderson recorded "Rose Garden" after hearing Joe South's version. However, Anderson's producer rejected the song's recording because he did not consider it to be a female tune. After much convincing, the song was eventually recorded and released as a single by Columbia Records. The song became a crossover hit after it reached both the American Billboard country and pop charts. "Rose Garden" also became a major hit worldwide, reaching the number-one spot in multiple countries.

In 1971 at the 13th Annual Grammy Awards, the Lynn Anderson version of "Rose Garden" won her the Grammy for Best Country Vocal Performance, Female.

"Rose Garden" has since been recorded by artists of various styles and musical genres. Notable covers include those by k.d. lang in 1985 and Martina McBride in 2005, yet Anderson's version has been considered a country music standard and signature country pop recording. In recent years, the song has appeared in various music publications.

In 1999, BMI named "Rose Garden" the 99th-most played song of the 20th century, on American radio and television.

== Background, composition, and early versions ==
"Rose Garden"

Song by Joe South

from the album Introspect
- B-side: "Mirror of Your Mind"
- Released: December 1968
- Recorded: 1968
- Studio: Positive Record Production
- Genre: Contemporary pop; pop rock
- Length: 2:50
- Label: Capitol
- Songwriter: Joe South
- Producer: Joe South

"Rose Garden"

Single by Dobie Gray
- B-side: "Where's the Girl Gone"
- Released: May 1969
- Genre: R&B; soul
- Length: 2:57
- Label: White Whale
- Composer: Joe South
- Lyricist: Joe South
- Producers: Tommy Amato; Quitman Dennis; Brent Maher

Dobie Gray singles chronology
"We the People" (1968)	"Rose Garden" (1969)	"Do You Really Have a Heart" (1969)

According to South, he drew inspiration for "Rose Garden" from the confidence he obtained as a songwriter. In the years before the song's composition, South had collaborated with Bob Dylan and was inspired by his songwriting technique. "Before him, there was this idea that you could only use certain words or images in pop songs, but he started putting in words that you’d expect to just find in books and in poetry. He opened everything up," he recalled in 1994. After working with Dylan, South's writing style shifted, and his songs became more successful. His 1965 composition "Down in the Boondocks" became a hit for Billy Joe Royal, as did "Hush" for Deep Purple in 1968.

Although South recorded his own version, Billy Joe Royal had cut "Rose Garden" first. The song first appeared on Royal's 1967 studio album Billy Joe Royal featuring Hush. The song and its corresponding album were recorded in July 1967 in Atlanta, Georgia. The album was later released in November 1967, but the song was not issued as a single.

South's version was first released as an album track on his 1968 debut studio release, Introspect. It was cut at the Positive Record Production Studio in 1968. The session for the song was produced by South himself. The album was released on Capitol Records and appeared as the second track on the project. Bruce Eder of Allmusic praised "Rose Garden" in his review of Introspect, commenting that South's version was "worth hearing".

In 1969, American rhythm and blues artist Dobie Gray recorded "Rose Garden". Gray's version was the first to be released as a single to mainstream radio. "Rose Garden" was released on White Whale Records in 1969. The recording was a collaborative production effort among several producers, including Brent Maher. Gray's version reached low charting positions on the American and Canadian pop music charts following its release. In the United States, "Rose Garden" peaked at number 19 on the Billboard Bubbling Under Hot 100 singles chart. In Canada, the single peaked at number 89 on the RPM Top Singles list.

=== Dobie Gray version ===
==== 7-inch vinyl single ====
- "Rose Garden" – 2:57
- "Where's the Girl Gone" – 2:15

==== Charts ====
Chart (1969)	Peak position
Canada Top Singles (RPM)	89
US Bubbling Under Hot 100 Singles (Billboard)	19

== Lynn Anderson version ==
"Rose Garden"
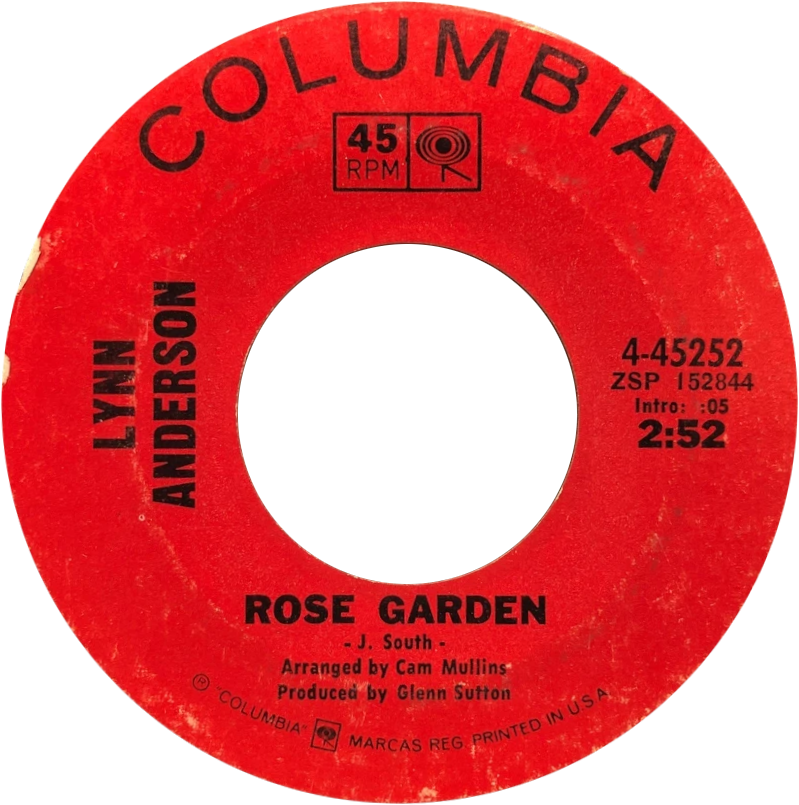
- US single of the Lynn Anderson recording

Single by Lynn Anderson

from the album Rose Garden
- B-side: "Nothing Between Us"
- Released: October 1970
- Recorded: August 1970
- Studio: Columbia (Nashville, Tennessee)
- Genre: Country; Countrypolitan
- Length: 2:52
- Label: Columbia
- Songwriter: Joe South
- Producer: Glenn Sutton

Lynn Anderson singles chronology
"I'm Alright" (1970)	"Rose Garden" (1970)	"It Wasn't God Who Made Honky Tonk Angels" (1970)

Official audio
- "(I Never Promised You A) Rose Garden" on YouTube

=== Background and recording ===
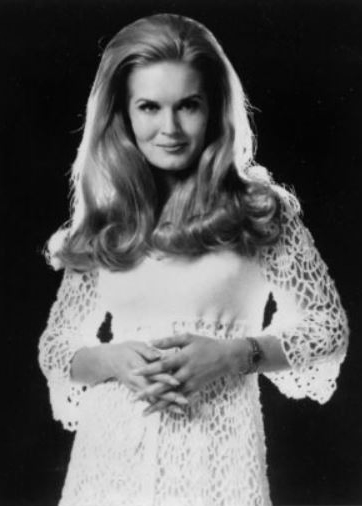
Lynn Anderson, 1970

In 1970, Lynn Anderson's exposure on the Lawrence Welk Show led to the major label Columbia Records signing her to their country roster. She had previously recorded for an independent label and had several country hits, including "If I Kiss You (Will You Go Away)" (1967). After switching to Columbia, Anderson moved to Nashville, Tennessee, to further elevate her country-music career. Under Columbia, Anderson worked with her husband (and producer) Glenn Sutton. Anderson's style shifted towards country pop once she began collaborating with Sutton, and she started looking for songs that suited this style. Her first country-pop hit released on the label was 1970's "Stay There, Till I Get There," which Sutton wrote and produced.

The pair began looking for new country pop material following her first Columbia single success. Anderson brought in Joe South's version of "Rose Garden" to record. However, Sutton originally refused to record it. "Glenn told me that I could not record the song because it was not a girl's song—that the song had some lines in it that a girl just would not sing! Like the line 'I could promise you things like big diamond rings' that a girl would not sing," Anderson recalled. According to Sutton, after she continued to bring in the song, he decided to record it. "I had objected to it because it was a man's song and I didn't wanna do it, but she kept bringin' it in with her – she loved it," Sutton recounted.

"Rose Garden" was cut in August 1970 at the Columbia Recording Studio, located in Nashville. Sutton produced the track. Sutton recalled that a first version was recorded with a "straight, boring beat." However, when guitarist Ray Edenton reworked the introduction, it was re-recorded in 20 minutes. Strings were also added to the second recording after Billy Sherrill had offered his string musicians to Sutton. He agreed and had arranger Cam Mullins write the string section for the track.

=== Release and reception ===
"Rose Garden" was not intended to be released as a single. The decision was changed after Sutton had met with Columbia Records president, Clive Davis. Sutton recalled that Davis had been in Nashville attending a disc jockey convention. The pair were spending time during the convention while Sutton was mixing "Rose Garden". Davis heard the song and said to Sutton, "I'll talk to you in a little while, we got a meeting right now. That's her next single. Get that mixed. That's great, that's a smash."

The song was officially released as a single in October 1970. It peaked at number one on the Billboard Hot Country Singles chart, spending five weeks at the top of the survey between 1970 and 1971. "Rose Garden" also crossed over to the Billboard Hot 100, where it became a major hit, peaking at number three in February 1971. It also became a top-10 hit on the Easy Listening Singles chart, reaching the number-five position. Internationally, "Rose Garden" became a major hit in 16 countries. In the United Kingdom for example, the single reached number three in 1971. The song's popularity was also evident in sales. After selling 1,000,000 copies, "Rose Garden" was certified gold from the Recording Industry Association of America. "Rose Garden" became Anderson's biggest hit and signature song in her career.

Anderson's version has been reviewed positively since its release. David Cantwell and Bill Friskics-Warren included her 1970 recording in their 2003 book Heartaches by the Number: Country Music's 500 Greatest Singles, highlighting its arrangement. "The opening strings, lots of them, ominous and unforgettable, snap your head back like a slap in the face", Cantwell wrote, also noting, "the most pinched, manic pedal-steel guitar you've ever heard," they commented. For Allmusic, Stephen Thomas Erlewine praised Anderson for "fine, sweet vocals" while calling the lyrics "appealing, albeit predictable" and the "I never promised you a rose garden" line from the chorus a cliché. Markpos Papadatos of the Digital Journal called the record "a classic country song" after announcing its 45-year anniversary.

In 2024, Rolling Stone ranked Anderson's rendition at number 88 on its 200 Greatest Country Songs of All Time list.

=== Legacy ===
Since its release, Anderson's version of "Rose Garden" has been considered a country and crossover music standard. Mary Bufwack and Robert K. Oermann commented on the song's legacy in their book Finding Their Voice: The History of Women in Country Music. "Her 'Rose Garden' of 1970 ushered in a decade of 'crossover' country women whose music reached out to the broader pop marketplace and dramatically expanded country music's national notoriety," they said. Stephen Thomas Erlewine of Allmusic called it "a virtual standard during the '70s," due to it being covered by multiple artists in that decade. The song was also included on Country Music Television's 2003 list of the "100 Greatest Songs in Country Music." In 2019, Rolling Stone named "Rose Garden" in its list "20 Songs that Defined the Early Seventies," describing the song as "an optimistic anthem that also served as a splash of cold water to the face" during the Vietnam War.

Anderson reflected on the song's legacy, as well. "It was popular because it touched on emotions. It was perfectly timed. It was out just as we came out of the Vietnam years and a lot of people were trying to recover," she commented.

=== 7-inch vinyl single ===
- "Rose Garden" – 2:52
- "Nothing Between Us" – 2:49

=== Charts ===
Weekly charts

Chart (1970–1971)	Peak position
Australia (Kent Music Report)	1
Austria (Ö3 Austria Top 40)	4
Belgium (Ultratop 50 Flanders)	1
Canada Top Singles (RPM)	1
Canada Adult Contemporary (RPM)	18
Canada Country Singles (RPM)	1
Finland	1
Ireland (IRMA)	1
Netherlands (Single Top 100)	2
New Zealand	1
Norway (VG-lista)	1
South Africa (Springbok)	2
Switzerland (Schweizer Hitparade)	1
UK Singles (Official Charts)	3
US Billboard Hot 100	3
US Adult Contemporary (Billboard)	5
US Hot Country Songs (Billboard)	1
US Cash Box Top 100	1
West Germany (GfK)	1

Year-end charts

Chart (1971)	Rank
Australia	9
Canada Top Singles (RPM)	18
Netherlands	14
Switzerland	3
US Billboard Hot 100	41
US Adult Contemporary (Billboard)	39
US Cash Box Top 100	6

=== Certifications ===
Region	Certification	Certified units/sales
United States (RIAA)	Gold	1,000,000^{^}
^{^} Shipments figures based on certification alone.

== Other versions ==
"Rose Garden"

Single by New World

from the album New World
- B-side: "Ain't Nobody Ever Gonna Wonder Why"
- Released: 1971
- Genre: Pop
- Label: RAK
- Songwriter: Joe South

New World singles chronology
"Something's Wrong" (1970)	"Rose Garden" (1971)	"Tom-Tom Turnaround" (1972)

Notable versions of "Rose Garden" appeared by music artists of various genres. Johnny Mathis recorded the track for his 1971 studio album Love Story. Writer Joe Viglione praised the production of Mathis' cover. "As a pure pop tune, it works very well, a standout performance chock-full of backing vocalists and unique instrumentation. This could have been a hit for Mathis, as it goes beyond the usual formula of "let's put some sweet accompaniment behind the voice and let Johnny do his thing," he commented. Also in 1971, a cover version by the Australian group New World reached number 15 on the UK Singles Chart. Sandie Shaw also released a version of the song in early 1971 on a PYE 7" single, but failed to register in the official UK singles chart, although it did reach #41 in the alternative Record Mirror chart.

In 1988, Canadian synthpop group Kon Kan sampled Lynn Anderson's version of "Rose Garden" for their song "I Beg Your Pardon". The song became a major hit in several countries, including the United Kingdom, where it reached the top five, and the United States, where it reached the top 20 on the Hot 100. Japanese composer Kyōhei Tsutsumi used the melody of the song as the basis for Saori Minami's "17-sai", which peaked at number two on Oricon's singles chart in 1971. "17-sai" was then covered by Chisato Moritaka in 1989, reaching number eight on the same chart.

=== k.d. lang version ===
"Rose Garden"

Single by k.d. lang

from the album Angel with a Lariat
- B-side: "High Time for a Detour"
- Released: 1987
- Studio: CTS Studios
- Genre: Pop rock; country
- Length: 3:19
- Label: Sire
- Songwriter: Joe South
- Producer: Dave Edmunds

K.d. lang singles chronology
"Turn Me Around" (1987)	"Rose Garden" (1987)	"Tune into My Wave" (1987)

Among the song's notable covers was by Canadian artist k.d. lang, who released "Rose Garden" as a single. lang's version was recorded at CTS Studios and was produced by Dave Edmunds. It first appeared on her studio album Angel with a Lariat, which was credited as "k.d. lang and the Reclines". "Rose Garden" was released as the album's second single, with "Turn Me Around" being the album's first. The single version of "Rose Garden" did not credit her band, the Reclines. The song became lang's first major hit as a music artist. It reached the top 10 of the Canadian RPM Adult Contemporary Songs chart, peaking at number seven. It also made an entry on the RPM Country Songs chart, where it reached number 45.

lang's version of "Rose Garden" received a mixed reception from critics. Mark Deming of Allmusic praised the song, calling her version one "that actually tops the original." When reviewing Angel with a Lariat, Jack Hurst of the Chicago Tribune noted that the song's production (along with the album's other tracks) lacked a focus on lang's singing. "Producer Dave Edmunds has supervised the making of an excellent-sounding country-rock album from the musical point of view, but he unfortunately paid little attention to lang's singing, often covering it up entirely."

==== 7-inch vinyl single ====
- "Rose Garden" – 3:19
- "High Time for a Detour" – 4:09

==== Charts ====
Chart (1987)	Peak position
Canada Adult Contemporary Songs (RPM)	7
Canada Country Songs (RPM)	45

=== Martina McBride version ===
"(I Never Promised You A) Rose Garden"

Single by Martina McBride

from the album Timeless
- Released: August 15, 2005
- Recorded: 2005
- Studio: Blackbird (Nashville, Tennessee)
- Genre: Country pop
- Length: 3:16
- Label: RCA Nashville
- Songwriter: Joe South
- Producer: Martina McBride

Martina McBride singles chronology
"God's Will" (2004)	"(I Never Promised You A) Rose Garden" (2005)	"I Still Miss Someone" (2005)

In 2005, American country artist Martina McBride recorded a cover of "Rose Garden" for her album of classic country songs, Timeless. The song was chosen as the lead single for the album and it was released on August 15, 2005. The song was recorded at the Blackbird Studio, in Nashville, in 2005. Released on RCA Nashville, the single's name was stylistically changed to "(I Never Promised You A) Rose Garden". McBride's version spent 22 weeks on the Billboard Hot Country Songs chart and became a major hit by the end of the year. In December 2005, the song peaked at number 18 on the chart. The single also charted at number 98 on the Hot 100 after spending only two weeks there.

McBride's version received positive reviews by writers and music critics. Stephen Thomas Erlewine of AllMusic called the track a song that remains "a radio staple to this day." Along with the other tracks on Timeless, Erlewine noted that McBride had "range, power, and subtlety as a vocalist, as well as her skill as an interpreter." Arden Lambert of Country Thang Daily also gave McBride's version a positive review. "Even if Anderson owns the songs, we can say that McBride did an amazing cover of it. She kept the original melody of it but added her own magic into the song. Martina McBride wonderfully sang the song that gave Lynn Anderson a boost in her career," Lambert commented.

==== Digital download single ====
- "(I Never Promised You A) Rose Garden" – 3:16

==== Charts ====
Chart (2005—2006)	Peak position
Brazil Hot 100 Airplay (Billboard Brasil)	94
US Hot Country Songs (Billboard)	18
US Billboard Hot 100	98

==== Release history (Martina McBride version) ====
Release dates and format(s) for "(I Never Promised You A) Rose Garden"
Region	Date	Format(s)	Label(s)	Ref.
United States	August 15, 2005	Country radio	RCA Records Nashville	

=== Morrissey version ===
A live recording of the song, performed at the Grand Ole Opry, Nashville, by English singer Morrissey was included as the B side of his 2018 single "All the Young People Must Fall in Love"; it was later included on the deluxe edition of the album Low in High School.
