= Glenn Sutton =

American singer-songwriter (1937–2007)

- Born: Royce Glenn Sutton; September 28, 1937; Hodge, Louisiana, U.S.
- Died: April 17, 2007 (aged 69) Nashville, Tennessee, U.S.
- Genres: Country
- Occupations: Singer-songwriter, record producer

Royce Glenn Sutton (September 28, 1937 – April 17, 2007) was an American country music singer-songwriter, record producer, and an influence in the countrypolitan style of country music.

== Biography ==
Sutton was born in Hodge, Louisiana, and grew up in Chireno, Texas. He began writing songs at an early age, and moved to Henderson, where Jim Reeves was an announcer on local AM radio station KGRI. At the age of 16 Sutton began hosting a 15-minute show on Saturdays at the station. While serving in the United States Air Force he formed a band, and when he left the service he continued to perform while working other jobs. In 1964, he moved to Nashville and signed with music publisher Al Gallico Music.

In 1965, Sutton wrote the title track for Eddy Arnold's 1965 album The Easy Way, and the song was included as the B-Side of Arnold's hit version of "Make the World Go Away". Sutton eventually began collaborating with Billy Sherrill, and together they wrote "Almost Persuaded", which became a hit for David Houston in 1966 and won the Grammy Award for Best Country & Western Recording in 1966. The song has been covered by artists from all genres of music, including R&B legend Etta James, and has gone on to become a country standard. He also wrote two songs that became country hits for Jerry Lee Lewis in 1968: "Another Place, Another Time" and "What's Made Milwaukee Famous (Has Made a Loser Out of Me)".

Many of his songs were written in collaboration with Billy Sherrill who was also his boss at Columbia Records where he was employed as a record producer for several country artists. Sutton wrote or co-wrote many of Tammy Wynette's early hits including, "Your Good Girl's Gonna Go Bad", "Take Me to Your World", "I Don't Wanna Play House", "The Ways to Love a Man", "Kids Say the Darndest Things", and "Bedtime Story".

He may be best known for his personal and professional association with Lynn Anderson, his wife from 1968 to 1977. He produced her Columbia recordings from 1970 to 1976, including her signature, global hit "(I Never Promised You a) Rose Garden", penned by Joe South. The album by the same name as the single became a hit in 16 countries and was the biggest selling album by a female country artist from 1970 until 1997. Sutton received an RIAA platinum award for producing "Rose Garden". Sutton also wrote three of Anderson's Billboard number one country records, "You're My Man", "Keep Me in Mind, and "What a Man My Man Is", as well as several of her top-ten and top-20 hits.

In 1976, Sutton left Columbia and continued to produce records independently. Though never really pursuing a solo career as a singer, he recorded two singles that made the Billboard country charts, including the novelty song "The Football Card", which nearly made the top forty on the Billboard Hot 100 in 1979.

He was awarded numerous BMI and ASCAP Awards for his hit compositions. Artists who have recorded Glenn Sutton-penned songs reads like a "who's who" in the recording industry. He was inducted into the Nashville Songwriters Hall of Fame in 1999.

Sutton died in Nashville on April 17, 2007, of a heart attack, aged 69.
