= Lynn Anderson singles discography =

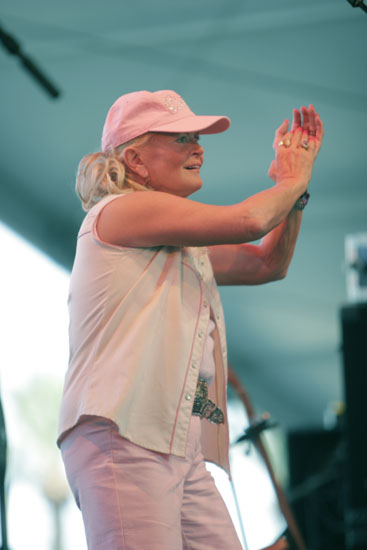
- Lynn Anderson in concert, 2009.
- Singles: 72
- B-sides: 1
- Music videos: 2
- Other song appearances: 9
- Promotional singles: 3

The singles discography of American country music artist Lynn Anderson contains 72 singles, three promotional singles, one charting B-side, two music videos and nine other song appearances. She signed her first recording contract with Chart Records in 1966. The following year, her single "Ride, Ride, Ride" debuted on the Billboard Hot Country Singles chart. Also in 1967, her single "If I Kiss You (Will You Go Away)" became her first major hit when it reached number five on the country singles chart. Anderson had a series of hits that reached the top ten and 20 during the 1960s including "Promises, Promises" (1969), "No Another Time" (1968), "Big Girls Don't Cry" (1968) and "That's a No No" (1969).

Anderson had her biggest song success after switching to Columbia Records in 1970. Her second Columbia single, "Rose Garden", became the biggest hit of her career. The song reached number one on the Billboard country chart and was her first to crossover onto the Billboard Hot 100, where it reached number three. "Rose Garden" would also become a hit in 16 other countries. Anderson followed the song with two more number one hits on the Billboard country chart: "You're My Man" and "How Can I Unlove You".

Her cover version of "Cry" became a top five country hit and minor pop hit in 1972. This was followed by "Keep Me in Mind" (1973) and "What a Man My Man Is" (1974), which both topped the Billboard country survey. Anderson was also the first artist to release and have a hit with "Top of the World", a song that was later a number one pop hit for The Carpenters. As the decade progressed, Anderson's singles were less successful. She had top 20 Billboard country hits during this time with "He Turns It into Love Again" (1977) and "Wrap Your Love All Around Your Man" (1977). In 1979, she had a top ten hit with "Isn't It Always Love" before leaving Columbia Records in 1981.

Anderson returned in 1983 after a short hiatus with "What I Learned from Loving You". The song reached number 18 on the Billboard country songs chart. It was followed in 1984 by "You're Welcome to Tonight", a duet with Gary Morris that reached number nine on the country survey. Her 1988 cover of "Under the Boardwalk" reached number 24 on the country singles chart in 1988. In 1989, "How Many Hearts" became her final single to make the Billboard Hot Country Songs chart, peaking at number 69. Although she continued recording, Anderson released fewer singles towards the end of her career. Her final singles were released in 2015.

== Singles ==
=== As lead artist ===
List of singles, with selected chart positions and certifications, showing other relevant details
Title	Year	Peak chart positions							Certifications	Album
Title	Year	US	US AC	US Cou.	AUS	CAN	CAN AC	CAN Cou.	Certifications	Album
"In Person"	1966	—	—	—	—	—	—	—		Ride, Ride, Ride
"Ride, Ride, Ride"	1966	—	—	36	—	—	—	—		Ride, Ride, Ride
"If I Kiss You (Will You Go Away)"	1967	—	—	5	—	—	—	—		Ride, Ride, Ride
"Too Much of You"	1967	—	—	28	—	—	—	—		Ride, Ride, Ride
"Promises, Promises"	1967	—	—	4	—	—	—	—		Promises, Promises
"No Another Time"	1968	—	—	8	—	—	—	19		Promises, Promises
"Big Girls Don't Cry"	1968	—	—	12	—	—	—	1		Big Girls Don't Cry
"Flattery Will Get You Everywhere"	1968	—	—	11	—	—	—	27		With Love, from Lynn
"Our House Is Not a Home (For It's Never Been Loved In)"	1969	—	—	18	—	—	—	3		With Love, from Lynn
"Where's the Playground, Bobby"	1969	—	—	—	—	—	—	—		At Home with Lynn
"That's a No No"	1969	—	—	2	—	—	—	2		At Home with Lynn
"He'd Still Love Me"	1969	—	—	15	—	—	—	—		Uptown Country Girl
"I've Been Everywhere"	1970	—	—	16	—	—	—	21		Uptown Country Girl
"Stay There, Till I Get There"	1970	—	—	7	—	—	—	22		Stay There 'Til I Get There
"No Love at All"	1970	—	—	15	—	—	—	42		No Love at All
"Rose Garden"	1970	3	5	1	1	1	18	1	RIAA: Platinum	Rose Garden
"You're My Man"	1971	63	6	1	98	75	7	2		You're My Man
"How Can I Unlove You"	1971	63	30	1	—	42	14	1		How Can I Unlove
"Cry"	1972	71	16	3	—	77	9	1		Cry
"Listen to a Country Song"	1972	— (Note: "Listen to a Country Song" did not enter the Hot 100, but peaked at number 7 on Bubbling Under Hot 100 Singles, which acts as a 25-song extension of the Hot 100.)	—	4	—	—	—	1		Listen to a Country Song
"Fool Me"	1972	— (Note: "Fool Me" did not enter the Hot 100, but peaked at number 1 on Bubbling Under Hot 100 Singles, which acts as a 25-song extension of the Hot 100.)	—	4	—	—	—	1		Listen to a Country Song
"Keep Me in Mind"	1973	— (Note: "Keep Me in Mind" did not enter the Hot 100, but peaked at number 4 on Bubbling Under Hot 100 Singles, which acts as a 25-song extension of the Hot 100.)	—	1	—	—	—	1		Keep Me in Mind
"Top of the World"	1973	74	34	2	—	—	30	1		Top of the World
"Sing About Love"	1973	—	—	3	—	—	—	3		Top of the World
"Smile for Me"	1974	—	—	15	—	—	—	10		Smile for Me
"Talkin' to the Wall"	1974	—	—	7	—	—	—	1		Smile for Me
"What a Man My Man Is"	1974	93	—	1	—	—	—	93		What a Man My Man Is
"He Turns It into Love Again"	1975	—	—	13	—	—	37	28		I've Never Loved Anyone More
"I've Never Loved Anyone More"	1975	—	—	14	—	—	—	4		I've Never Loved Anyone More
"Paradise"	1975	—	—	26	—	—	—	16		All the King's Horses
"All the King's Horses"	1976	—	—	20	—	—	—	5		All the King's Horses
"Rodeo Cowboy"	1976	—	—	44	—	—	—	42		All the King's Horses
"Sweet Talkin' Man"	1976	—	—	23	—	—	—	27		Wrap Your Love All Around; Your Man
"Wrap Your Love All Around Your Man"	1977	—	—	12	—	—	—	6		Wrap Your Love All Around; Your Man
"I Love What Love Is Doing to Me"	1977	—	—	22	—	—	—	—		I Love What Love Is Doing to Me/ He Ain't You
"He Ain't You"	1977	—	—	19	—	—	—	15		I Love What Love Is Doing to Me/ He Ain't You
"We Got Love"	1977	—	—	26	—	—	—	17		I Love What Love Is Doing to Me/ He Ain't You
"Rising Above It All"	1978	—	—	44	—	—	—	21		From the Inside
"Last Love of My Life"	1978	—	—	43	—	—	—	—		From the Inside
"Isn't It Always Love"	1979	—	—	10	—	—	—	7		Outlaw Is Just a State of Mind
"I Love How You Love Me"	1979	—	—	18	—	—	—	40		Outlaw Is Just a State of Mind
"Sea of Heartbreak"	1979	—	—	33	—	—	—	—		Outlaw Is Just a State of Mind
"Even Cowgirls Get the Blues"	1980	—	—	26	—	—	—	23		Even Cowgirls Get the Blues
"Blue Baby Blue"	1980	—	—	27	—	—	—	—		Even Cowgirls Get the Blues
"Midnight Train to Georgia"	1982	—	—	—	—	—	—	—		The Best of Lynn Anderson: Memories and Desires
"You Can't Lose What You Never Had"	1983	—	—	42	—	—	—	—		Back
"What I Learned from Loving You"	1983	—	—	18	—	—	—	—		Back
"You're Welcome to Tonight" (with Gary Morris)	1983	—	—	9	—	—	—	—		Back
"Heart of the Matter"	1984	—	—	—	—	—	—	—		—N/a
"Didn't We Shine"	1986	—	—	45	—	—	—	—		—N/a
"Read Between the Lines"	1987	—	—	38	—	—	—	—		—N/a
"Under the Boardwalk"	1988	—	—	24	—	—	—	50		What She Does Best
"What He Does Best"	1988	—	—	50	—	—	—	—		What She Does Best
"How Many Hearts"	1989	—	—	69	—	—	—	—		What She Does Best
"Cry"	2004	—	—	—	—	—	—	—		The Bluegrass Sessions
"Full Moon in Baghdad"	2006	—	—	—	—	—	—	—		Cowgirl
"I Won't Leave You Lonely"	2007	—	—	—	—	—	—	—		An All Star Tribute to Shania Twain
"Just Like Jesse James"	2007	—	—	—	—	—	—	—		An All Star Tribute to Cher
"Day One"	2012	—	—	—	—	—	—	—		—N/a
"Drift Away Gospel"	2015	—	—	—	—	—	—	—		Bridges
"—" denotes a recording that did not chart or was not released in that territory.

=== Other singles ===
List of singles, with selected chart positions, showing other relevant details
Title	Year	Peak chart positions			Album	Notes
Title	Year	US	US Cou.	CAN Cou.	Album	Notes
"For Better or for Worse" (with Jerry Lane)	1966	—	—	—	—N/a	(Note: Released as a single in February 1966 via Chart Records and was not issued on an official album.)
"Keeping Up Appearances" (with Jerry Lane)	1967	—	49	—	—N/a	(Note: Released as a single in January 1967 via Chart Records and was not issued on an official album. "Keeping Up Appearances" was recorded as a duet with country artist Jerry Lane and was the final song issued by the pair.)
"Mother, May I" (with Liz Anderson)	1968	—	21	16	—N/a	(Note: Released as a single in February 1968 via RCA Victor Records. The song was recorded as a duet with Anderson's mother and country artist Liz Anderson. It was the pair's only single recorded together.)
"Rocky Top"	1970	—	17	33	I'm Alright	(Note: Released as a single in April 1970 via Chart Records and appeared on the studio album I'm Alright. "Rocky Top" was released after Anderson had already started issuing singles with the larger Columbia Records.)
"I'm Alright"	1970	— (Note: "I'm Alright" did not enter the Hot 100, but peaked at number 12 on Bubbling Under Hot 100 Singles, which acts as a 25-song extension of the Hot 100.)	20	37	I'm Alright	(Note: Released as a single in October 1970 via Chart Records and appeared on the studio album of the same name. "I'm Alright" was released after Anderson had already started issuing singles with the larger Columbia Records.)
"Ding-a-Ling Christmas Bell"	1970	—	—	—	The Christmas Album	(Note: Released as a Christmas single in November 1970 via Columbia Records and appeared on Anderson's 1971 holiday effort The Christmas Album.)
"It Wasn't God Who Made Honky Tonk Angels"	1970	—	20	37	Songs That Made Country Girls Famous	(Note: Released as a single in December 1970 via Chart Records and appeared on the studio album Songs That Made Country Girls Famous. It was released after Anderson already started issuing singles with the larger Columbia Records.)
"Jim Dandy"	1971	—	74	—	At Home with Lynn	(Note: Released as a single in April 1971 via Chart Records and appeared on the 1969 album At Home with Lynn. "Jim Dandy" was released after Anderson had already started issuing singles with the larger Columbia Records in 1970.)
"He Even Woke Me Up to Say Goodbye"	1971	—	54	—	Uptown Country Girl	(Note: Released as a single in July 1971 via Chart Records and appeared on the 1970 studio album Uptown Country Girl The song was released after Anderson had already started issuing singles with the larger Columbia Records in 1970.)
"One Big Family"	1985	—	61	—	—N/a	(Note: Released as a charity single in 1985 by Compleat Records to raise awareness for the 1983–85 famine in Ethiopia. Anderson was featured on the project and the group was billed as the "Heart of Nashville".)
"Fools for Each Other" (with Ed Bruce)	1986	—	49	—	Night Things	(Note: Released as a single in August 1986 via RCA Records and was recorded as duet with country artist Ed Bruce. "Fools for Each Other" appeared on Bruce's studio album entitled Night Things.)
"Tomorrow's World"	1991	—	74	—	—N/a	(Note: Released as a charity single in 1991 by Warner Bros. Records to honor Earth Day. Anderson was featured on the project and the group was billed as "Various Artists".)
"—" denotes a recording that did not chart or was not released in that territory.

== Promotional singles ==
List of singles, showing all relevant details
Title	Year	Album	Ref.
"Don't Wish Me Merry Christmas"	1972	The Christmas Album	
"Outlaw Is Just a State of Mind"	1979	Outlaw Is Just a State of Mind	
"Angel Song (Glory to God in the Highest)" (with Butch Baker)	1988	—N/a	

== Other charted songs ==
List of songs, with selected chart positions, showing other relevant details
Title	Year	Peak chart positions	Album	Notes
Title	Year	US Country	Album	Notes
"Dixieland You Will Never Die"	1976	44	All the King's Horses	(Note: Released as the B-side to "Rodeo Cowboy", issued on Columbia Records in May 1976. Because the release charted as a double-sided single, "Dixieland You Will Never Die" reached the same position as its A-side.)

== Other song appearances ==
List of non-single guest appearances, with other performing artists, showing year released and album name
Title	Year	Other artist(s)	Album	Ref.
"Whenever I Call You Friend"	1997	Tom Jones	Tom Jones and Friends Live!	
"Heartbreak Hotel"	1999	—N/a	Remembering Elvis: Louisiana Hayride & Elvis Tribute	
"A Mansion on the Hill"	1999	—N/a	Lost Highway: A Tribute to Hank Williams	
"Go Tell It on the Mountain"	1999	—N/a	Made in America: Essential Folk	
"Honky Tonk Town"	2004	Eve Selis	Nothing But the Truth	
"Faded Love"	2005	Johnny Rodriguez	A Tribute to Bob's 100th Birthday	
"Cry"	2006	Bellamy Brothers	Let Your Love Flow: The Best of the Bellamy Brothers	
"I've Been Everywhere"	2008	Johnny Cash	The Best of the Johnny Cash TV Show: 1969-1971	
"(I've Never Promised You A) Rose Garden"	2014	Mary Sarah	Bridges: Great American Country Duets	

== Music videos ==
Year	Video
1985	"One Big Family" (Heart of Nashville)
1990	"Tomorrow's World" (Various)
