= Lynn Anderson's Greatest Hits, Volume II =

Greatest hits album by Lynn Anderson
- Released: September 1976
- Recorded: 1972–1976
- Genre: Country; Countrypolitan
- Label: Columbia
- Producer: Glenn Sutton

Lynn Anderson chronology
All the King's Horses (1976)	Lynn Anderson's Greatest Hits, Volume II (1976)	Wrap Your Love All Around Your Man (1977)

Lynn Anderson's Greatest Hits, Volume II is a compilation album by American country artist Lynn Anderson. It was released in September 1976 via Columbia Records and was produced by Glenn Sutton. It was Anderson's third compilation release for the Columbia label and second "greatest hits" package for the company. The album contained some of her biggest hits for the label in the 1970s.

== Background, content and release ==
Lynn Anderson's Greatest Hits, Volume II contained some of Anderson's biggest hits from her years at Columbia Records. The album was derived from the success of her first greatest hits package in 1972. These songs on the package were first recorded between 1972 and 1976. They were all previously released on studio albums during that period. All of the album's tracks were first produced by Glenn Sutton, whom was also Anderson's husband at the time. The album contained ten tracks. All of the tracks were previously singles for Anderson. This included the number one country hits "What a Man My Man Is" and "Keep Me in Mind." The album also featured the top five country hits "Top of the World" and "Sing About Love". Additional featured tracks were top 20 hits, such as "He Turns It into Love Again" and "I've Never Loved Anyone More."

Lynn Anderson's Greatest Hits, Volume Two was released in September 1976 on Columbia Records. It was Anderson's third compilation to be released on the Columbia label. It was issued as a vinyl LP, containing five songs on each side of the record. The album spent a total of five weeks on the Billboard Top Country Albums list. In November 1976, it peaked at number 41 on the country albums chart. Because it contained all previously released material, no new singles were spawned from the compilation.

== Track listing ==
Side one
No.	Title	Writer(s)	Length
1.	"What a Man My Man Is"	Glenn Sutton	2:13
2.	"Smile for Me"	Rory Michael Bourke	2:48
3.	"Top of the World"	John Bettis; Richard Carpenter	2:55
4.	"Keep Me in Mind"	George Richey; Sutton	2:54
5.	"Dixieland, You Will Never Die"	Johnny Cunningham	3:48

Side two
No.	Title	Writer(s)	Length
1.	"All the King's Horses"	Cunningham	2:45
2.	"He Turns It into Love Again"	Jerry Cheshier; Murry Kellum; Sutton	2:27
3.	"I've Never Loved Anyone More"	Linda Hargrove; Michael Nesmith	2:41
4.	"Sing About Love"	Sutton	2:19
5.	"Rodeo Cowboy"	Sutton	2:39

== Personnel ==
All credits are adapted from the liner notes of Lynn Anderson's Greatest Hits.

Musical and technical personnel

- Lynn Anderson – lead vocals
- Bill Barnes – album design
- Alan Clayton – photography
- Slick Lawson – photography
- Glenn Sutton – producer

== Chart performance ==
Chart (1972–73)	Peak position
US Top Country Albums (Billboard)	41

== Release history ==
Region	Date	Format	Label	Ref.
United States	September 1976	Vinyl	Columbia Records	
