= Lynn Anderson's Greatest Hits, Vol. 1 =

Compilation album by Lynn Anderson
- Released: January 1971
- Genres: Country; Nashville Sound
- Label: Chart
- Producer: Slim Williamson

Lynn Anderson chronology
Rose Garden (1971)	Lynn Anderson's Greatest Hits, Vol. 1 (1971)	Lynn Anderson with Strings (1971)

Lynn Anderson's Greatest Hits, Vol. 1 is a compilation album by American country artist Lynn Anderson. It was released in January 1971 via Chart Records and was produced by Slim Williamson. The package was Anderson's third compilation released in her music career and contained previous hits recordings she had for the Chart label in the 1960s. Ten tracks were included in the album's release.

== Background and release ==
Lynn Anderson's Greatest Hits, Vol. 1 was the third compilation Chart Records issued of Anderson's material. It included material that had originally been produced by Slim Williamson for the label. Ten tracks were included on the collection. Of these recordings, only six were actually released as singles. These songs were "It Wasn't God Who Made Honky Tonk Angels", "That's a No No," "No Another Time," "Ride, Ride Ride," "Flattery Will Get You Everywhere" and "Our House Is Not a Home (For It's Never Been Loved In)." The remaining four tracks were album cuts that had also previously been issued on studio albums during her time with the Chart label.

Lynn Anderson's Greatest Hits, Vol. 1 was released in January 1971. The album was likely rushed out thanks to Anderson's concurrent success on Columbia Records particularly with her historic Rose Garden (album) but the "Hits" package was only a light chart success perhaps due to Chart Records was now a small independent label and no longer being distributed by RCA Victor. The album was issued as a vinyl LP and on all three tape formats 8 track, cassette, and reel. The album spent several weeks on the Billboard Top Country Albums chart in 1971. It eventually peaked at number 40 on the chart.

== Track listing ==
Side one
No.	Title	Writer(s)	Length
1.	"It Wasn't God Who Made Honky Tonk Angels"	J.D. Miller	2:15
2.	"That's a No No"	Ben Peters	2:00
3.	"Our House Is Not a Home (For It's Never Been Loved In)"	Shirley Mayo; Curly Putman	2:17
4.	"Ride, Ride, Ride"	Liz Anderson	2:05
5.	"Take Me Home"	Betty Jo Gibson	2:27

Side two
No.	Title	Writer(s)	Length
1.	"No Another Time"	Jerry Lane; Slim Williamson	2:00
2.	"Flattery Will Get You Everywhere"	Anderson	2:00
3.	"Partly Bill"	Steve Allen; Vince Bulla	2:37
4.	"Wave Bye Bye to the Man"	Joe Gibson; LaWanda Lindsey	2:07
5.	"The Worst Is Yet to Come"	Anderson	2:43

== Personnel ==
All credits are adapted from the liner notes of Lynn Anderson's Greatest Hits, Vol. 1.

Musical and technical personnel

- Lynn Anderson – lead vocals
- Slim Williamson – producer

== Chart performance ==
Chart (1971)	Peak position
US Top Country Albums (Billboard)	40

== Release history ==
Region	Date	Format	Label	Ref.
United States	January 1971	Vinyl	Chart Records	
Canada	January 1971	Vinyl	Chart Records	
