= The Best of Lynn Anderson (1968 album) =

Compilation album by Lynn Anderson
- Released: December 1968
- Recorded: 1966–1968
- Studio: RCA Victor Studio
- Genre: Country; Nashville Sound
- Label: Chart
- Producer: Slim Williamson

Lynn Anderson chronology
Big Girls Don't Cry (1968)	The Best of Lynn Anderson (1968)	With Love, from Lynn (1969)

The Best of Lynn Anderson is a compilation album by American country artist Lynn Anderson. It was released in December 1968 via Chart Records and was produced by Slim Williamson. It was the first compilation released in Anderson's music career and the first of several to be released on the Chart label. The album featured her most popular recordings occurring in the first several years of her music career. Twelve tracks were included on the album release.

== Background, release and reception ==
The Best of Lynn Anderson contained previously recorded hits made popular by Anderson in her early years at Chart Records. The songs were first recorded between 1966 and 1968 at the RCA Victor Studio, located in Nashville, Tennessee. All sessions were produced by Slim Williamson. Twelve tracks were included on the album. Of the songs featured, three were previously top ten hits for Anderson on the Billboard Hot Country Songs chart: "If I Kiss You (Will You Go Away)," "Promises, Promises" and "No Another Time." Two tracks were top 20 hits on the same chart: "Big Girls Don't Cry" and "I've Been Everywhere." Five songs on the album were additional cuts that were not issued as singles.

The Best of Lynn Anderson was released in December 1968 via Chart Records. It was Anderson's first compilation issued in her career and the first of several issued on Chart. The album was issued as a vinyl LP containing six songs on each side of the record. The Best of Lynn Anderson spent a total of 15 weeks on the Billboard Top Country Albums chart before reaching number 29 in March 1969. It additionally reached number 180 on the Billboard 200 albums chart, becoming her first appearance on the latter survey. The album received positive reception from Allmusic, which rated the release with 4.5 out of 5 stars.

== Track listing ==
Side one
No.	Title	Writer(s)	Length
1.	"Ride, Ride, Ride"	Liz Anderson	2:00
2.	"Too Much of You"	Gene Hood	2:20
3.	"If I Kiss You (Will You Go Away)"	Anderson	2:10
4.	"Strangers"	Anderson	2:33
5.	"No Another Time"	Jerry Lane; Slim Williamson	2:00
6.	"Sing Me a Sad Song"	Wynn Stewart	2:17

Side two
No.	Title	Writer(s)	Length
1.	"Promises, Promises"	Anderson; Carlyle Hughey; Wiley Smith	1:56
2.	"I Live to Love You"	Glenn Sutton	2:53
3.	"I've Been Everywhere"	Geoff Mack	2:19
4.	"Big Girls Don't Cry"	Anderson	2:26
5.	"Beggars Can't Be Choosers"	Anderson	2:00
6.	"There Oughta Be a Law"	Betty Jo Gibson	2:40

== Personnel ==
All credits are adapted from the liner notes of The Best of Lynn Anderson.

Musical and technical personnel

- Lynn Anderson – lead vocals
- Tom Pick – engineering
- Glenn Sutton – liner notes
- Bill Vandevort – engineering
- Slim Williamson – producer

== Chart performance ==
Chart (1968–1969)	Peak position
US Billboard 200	180
US Top Country Albums (Billboard)	29

== Release history ==
Region	Date	Format	Label	Ref.
Australia	1971	Vinyl	Festival Records	
United States	December 1968	Vinyl	Chart Records	
