= Songs My Mother Wrote (Lynn Anderson Sings Liz Anderson) =

Compilation album by Lynn Anderson
- Released: June 1970
- Recorded: 1966–1969
- Studio: RCA Victor Studio
- Genre: Country; Nashville Sound
- Label: Chart
- Producer: Slim Williamson

Lynn Anderson chronology
Stay There 'Til I Get There (1970)	Songs My Mother Wrote (Lynn Anderson Sings Liz Anderson) (1970)	No Love at All (1970)

Songs My Mother Wrote (Lynn Anderson Sings Liz Anderson) is a compilation album by American country artist Lynn Anderson. It was released in June 1970 via Chart Records and was produced by Slim Williamson. The album was Anderson's second compilation released in her music career. The album was a collection of recordings composed by her mother and songwriter, Liz Anderson. Twelve tracks were included on the record in its original release.

== Background, release and reception ==
Songs My Mother Wrote was a compilation that contained compositions by Anderson's mother, Liz Anderson. It was her mother who helped her daughter secure a recording contract and wrote a significant amount of her early hits for the Chart label. Her mother also wrote songs for other artists. Some of these tracks were recorded by her daughter as well and are included on the package. Anderson recorded the material featured in the album between 1966 and 1969 at the RCA Victor Studio in Nashville, Tennessee. All the sessions were produced by Slim Williamson. Twelve tracks were chosen for the album, all of which were either written or co-written by Liz Anderson. Four of the album's tracks were songs that became hits for Lynn Anderson, including "If I Kiss You (Will You Go Away)" and "Flattery Will Get You Everywhere." Also included is a cover of her mother's "Mama Spank," which was Liz Anderson's only top ten hit as a solo recording artist.

Songs My Mother Wrote was released in June 1970 on Chart Records. It was Anderson's second compilation issued in her music career. It was also one of several that would be released in the coming years by Chart. It was issued as a vinyl record, containing six songs on each side of the LP. Despite previous chart entries, Songs My Mother Wrote did not enter the Billboard country or pop album charts upon its release. The album did later receive a positive reception from Allmusic. The publication gave the package three out of five stars.

== Track listing ==
All songs were composed by Liz Anderson.

Side one

1. "Just Between the Two of Us" – 2:51
2. "I Keep Forgetting" – 2:51
3. "Be Quiet Mind" – 2:12
4. "Too Many Dollars, Not Enough Sense" – 2:06
5. "Flattery Will Get You Everywhere" – 2:20
6. "Mama Spank – 2:26

Side two

1. "If I Kiss You (Will You Go Away)" – 2:10
2. "(My Friends Are Gonna Be) Strangers" – 2:33
3. "If This Is Love" – 2:14
4. "Big Girls Don't Cry" – 2:26
5. "Ride, Ride, Ride" – 2:06
6. "Beggars Can't Be Choosers" – 2:00

== Personnel ==
All credits are adapted from the liner notes of Songs My Mother Wrote.

Musical and technical personnel

- Lynn Anderson – lead vocals
- Dan Quest Art Studio – design
- Slim Williamson – producer

== Release history ==
Region	Date	Format	Label	Ref.
United States	June 1970	Vinyl	Chart Records	
