= It Makes You Happy =

Compilation album by Lynn Anderson
- Released: 1974
- Genre: Country; Nashville Sound
- Label: Pickwick
- Producer: Slim Williamson

Lynn Anderson chronology
Flower of Love (1973)	It Makes You Happy (1974)	Smile for Me (1974)

It Makes You Happy is a compilation album by American country artist Lynn Anderson. It was released in 1974 via Pickwick Records and was produced by Slim Williamson. The album contained Anderson's previously released material from the Chart record label. It was the second album released on the Pickwick budget label and nine tracks were included.

== Background, release and reception ==
It Makes You Happy was a compilation of tracks Anderson first released when recording for the Chart record label in the 1960s. These early recordings were produced by Slim Williamson, Anderson's longtime Chart label producer. The Chart company had a licensing contract with the Pickwick label. However, by this period, Anderson had switched to the larger Columbia Records. Yet, Columbia had bought the music needed to release the Pickwick album. The album contained a total of nine previously released tracks. Three songs on the record were previously released as a singles, including her 1968 top ten hit "No Another Time." Also included are three tracks written by her mother, Liz Anderson.

It Makes You Happy was released in 1974 on Pickwick Records. It was her second compilation released on the label. The album was issued as a vinyl LP, containing five songs on side one and four songs on side two. Like some of her previous compilations, the record did not reach any chart positions on Billboard upon its release. This included the Top Country Albums chart. Greg Adams of Allmusic reviewed It Makes You Happy, giving it two out of five stars. Adams disliked the album's range of music and found it disorganized. "The Pickwick reissues seem to have been assembled almost at random and are thoroughly redundant except for those who don't already own the Chart albums," he concluded.

== Track listing ==
Side one
No.	Title	Writer(s)	Length
1.	"No Another Time"	Jerry Lane; Slim Williamson	2:00
2.	"Keeping Up Appearances" (with Jerry Lane)	Liz Anderson	2:22
3.	"Wave Bye Bye to the Man"	Betty Jo Gibson; LaWanda Lindsey	2:05
4.	"Too Much of You"	Gene Hood	2:19
5.	"You've Gotta Be the Greatest" (with Jerry Lane)	Anderson	2:03

Side two
No.	Title	Writer(s)	Length
1.	"A Hundred Times Today"	Anderson	2:24
2.	"For Better or For Worse" (with Jerry Lane)	Eddie Miller; Eddie Noack	2:28
3.	"The Worst Is Yet to Come"	Anderson	2:43
4.	"It Makes You Happy"	Gene Woods	2:37

== Personnel ==
All credits are adapted from the liner notes of It Makes You Happy.

Musical and technical personnel

- Lynn Anderson – lead vocals
- Slim Williamson – producer

== Release history ==
Region	Date	Format	Label	Ref.
United States	1974	Vinyl	Pickwick Records	
Canada	1974	Vinyl	Pickwick Records	
