= Big Girls Don't Cry (Lynn Anderson album) =

Studio album by Lynn Anderson
- Released: July 1968
- Recorded: March 1968
- Studio: RCA Victor (Nashville, Tennessee)
- Genre: Country; Nashville sound
- Length: 31:17
- Label: Chart
- Producer: Slim Williamson

Lynn Anderson chronology
Promises, Promises (1968)	Big Girls Don't Cry (1968)	The Best of Lynn Anderson (1968)

Singles from Big Girls Don't Cry
- 1. "Big Girls Don't Cry" Released: July 1968

Big Girls Don't Cry is a studio album by American country music artist Lynn Anderson. It was released in July 1968 via Chart Records and was produced by Slim Williamson. The record was Anderson's third studio recording issued during her career and contained a total of 12 tracks. The title track was spawned as a single from the project and became a major hit on the country charts. The album itself would also reach peak positions on music publication charts.

== Background and content ==
Big Girls Don't Cry was recorded in March 1968 at the RCA Victor Studio, which was located in Nashville, Tennessee. The sessions for the album were produced by Slim Williamson. It was Williamson who discovered Anderson and signed her to the Chart label in 1966. He had previously produced her studio albums Ride, Ride, Ride and Promises, Promises.

The album was a collection of 12 tracks. Five of the album's tracks were composed by her mother and Nashville songwriter, Liz Anderson. Liz Anderson had also composed material for her daughter's previous studio releases. While the 12 tracks included original recordings, some of the songs were cover versions. Among the album's cover tunes was Merle Haggard's "Strangers," Johnny Cash's "Ring of Fire" and Margie Singleton's "Wanderin' Mind."

== Release and reception ==
Professional ratings
Review scores
Source	Rating
AllMusic	3/5 stars

Big Girls Don't Cry was released in July 1968 on Chart Records, becoming her third studio album issued. It was issued as a vinyl LP, containing six songs on each side of the record. Upon its release, Big Girls Don't Cry charted on the Billboard Top Country Albums chart. It spent a total of 18 weeks on the list before reaching number 11 in September 1968. The album was reviewed positively by music writers and publications. Following its release, Billboard magazine gave the album a positive response. "The material which includes her fine renditions of 'Honey' and 'Ring of Fire' is diversified and has appeal for all buyers," the publication wrote.

The album's title track was the only single released from the project. It was also released in July 1968. Spending 14 weeks on the Billboard Hot Country Singles chart, the title track reached number 12 by September, becoming her fourth major hit. In Canada, the song became a larger hit. The title track became Anderson's first to reach the number one position on the Canadian RPM Country Songs chart. It was also her second single to chart on the list.

== Track listing ==
Side one
No.	Title	Writer(s)	Length
1.	"Big Girls Don't Cry"	Liz Anderson	2:26
2.	"Pick of the Week"	Anderson	2:16
3.	"Honey"	Bobby Russell	4:20
4.	"Just Between the Two of Us"	Anderson	2:51
5.	"I Live to Love You"	Glenn Sutton	2:53
6.	"Strangers"	Anderson	2:33

Side two
No.	Title	Writer(s)	Length
1.	"The Pillow That Whispers"	Cal Veale	2:42
2.	"Ring of Fire"	June Carter; Merle Kilgore	1:42
3.	"Come on Home"	Jack Rhodes; George Richey	2:32
4.	"Wandering Mind"	Leon Ashley; Kilgore; Margie Singleton	2:22
5.	"You Mean the World to Me"	Billy Sherrill; Glenn Sutton	2:23
6.	"I Keep Forgetting (That I Forgot About You)"	Anderson	1:51

== Personnel ==
All credits are adapted from the liner notes of Big Girls Don't Cry.

Musical and technical personnel

- Lynn Anderson – lead vocals
- Lloyd Green – arrangement
- Jim Malloy – engineering
- Tom Pick – engineering
- Bill Vandevort – engineering
- Slim Williamson – producer

== Chart performance ==
Chart (1968)	Peak position
US Top Country Albums (Billboard)	11

== Release history ==
Region	Date	Format	Label	Ref.
Canada	December 1967	Vinyl	RCA Victor Records	
United States	December 1967	Vinyl	Chart Records	
