= With Love, from Lynn =

Studio album by Lynn Anderson
- Released: March 1969
- Recorded: 1968
- Studio: RCA Victor (Nashville, Tennessee)
- Genre: Country; Nashville sound
- Length: 26:42
- Label: Chart
- Producer: Slim Williamson

Lynn Anderson chronology
The Best of Lynn Anderson (1968)	With Love, from Lynn (1969)	At Home with Lynn (1969)

Singles from With Love, from Lynn
- 1. "Flattery Will Get You Everywhere" Released: October 1968; 2. "Our House Is Not a Home (For It's Never Been Loved In)" Released: February 1969

With Love, from Lynn is a studio album released by American country artist Lynn Anderson. It was released in March 1969 via Chart Records and was produced by Slim Williamson. Her fourth studio release, With Love from Lynn contained 12 tracks. Two of these tracks were singles that became major hits for Anderson between 1968 and 1969. The album itself was successful after charting on the Billboard country albums survey.

== Background and content ==
With Love, from Lynn was recorded in 1968 at the RCA Victor Studio, located in Nashville, Tennessee. The sessions were produced by Slim Williamson, Anderson's producer on the Chart label. The collection consisted of 12 tracks. Of these songs, four were composed by Anderson's mother, Liz Anderson. Anderson's mother had written songs on her previous releases, including her previous hit singles such as "If I Kiss You (Will You Go Away)." One of the album's Liz Anderson-penned tunes was "Flattery Will Get You Everywhere." The song would later be issued as a single. Some tracks on the album were cover versions of songs recorded by other artists. The second track was a cover of Tammy Wynette's major hit, "Stand by Your Man." Additionally, one of the album's final tracks was a cover of Leroy Van Dyke's "The Auctioneer."

== Release and reception ==
Professional ratings
Review scores
Source	Rating
Allmusic	4/5 stars
Billboard	Favorable

With Love, from Lynn was officially released in March 1969 on Chart Records, becoming her fourth studio album in her career. The project was originally issued as a vinyl LP, containing six songs on each side of the record. It spent a total of 11 weeks on the Billboard Top Country Albums chart before peaking at number 22 in May 1969. Following its release, Billboard magazine gave the album a positive response. Writers praised the album's material, highlighting her cover of "Stand by Your Man" as well as "Wave Bye Bye to the Man" and "All You Add Is Love." In later years, it was reviewed favorably by Allmusic, receiving four out of five stars.

Two singles were included on the album. "Flattery Will Get You Everywhere" was the first single issued, with an October 1968 release date. The song became a major hit, reaching number 11 on the Billboard Hot Country Singles chart in February 1969. It was also a minor hit on the Canadian Country Singles chart, reaching number 27. "Our House Is Not a Home" was the second single issued, with a February 1969 release date. The song also became a major hit in the United States where it reached number 18 on the Billboard country singles list. On the RPM Country Singles chart, it became an even larger hit, reaching number three.

== Track listing ==
=== Vinyl version ===
Side one
No.	Title	Writer(s)	Length
1.	"All You Add Is Love"	Liz Anderson	2:02
2.	"Stand by Your Man"	Billy Sherrill; Tammy Wynette	2:27
3.	"Too Many Dollars, Not Enough Sense"	Anderson	2:06
4.	"A Million Shades of Blue"	Gene Hood	2:18
5.	"Only Baby That'll Walk the Line"	Jimmy Bryant	2:15
6.	"Be Quiet Mind"	Anderson	2:12

Side two
No.	Title	Writer(s)	Length
1.	"Flower of Love"	Leon Ashley; Margie Singleton	2:15
2.	"Wave Bye Bye to the Man"	Joe Gibson; LaWanda Lindsey	2:07
3.	"Our House Is Not a Home (For It's Never Been Loved In)"	Shirley Mayo; Curly Putman	2:25
4.	"The Wife You Save My Be Your Own"	Gibson; Charlie Wiggs	1:51
5.	"The Auctioneer"	Buddy Black; Leroy Van Dyke	2:34
6.	"Flattery Will Get You Everywhere"	Anderson	2:20

=== Digital version ===
With Love, from Lynn
No.	Title	Writer(s)	Length
1.	"All You Add Is Love"	Anderson	2:02
2.	"Stand by Your Man"	Sherrill; Wynette	2:27
3.	"Too Many Dollars, Not Enough Sense"	Anderson	2:06
4.	"A Million Shades of Blue"	Gene Hood	2:18
5.	"Only Baby That'll Walk the Line"	Bryant; Stone	2:15
6.	"Be Quiet Mind"	Anderson	2:12
7.	"Flower of Love"	Ashley; Singleton	2:15
8.	"Wave Bye Bye to the Man"	Joe Gibson; Lindsey	2:07
9.	"Our House Is Not a Home (For It's Never Been Loved In)"	Mayo; Putman	2:25
10.	"The Wife You Save My Be Your Own"	Gibson; Wiggs	1:51
11.	"The Auctioneer"	Black; Van Dyke	2:34
12.	"Flattery Will Get You Everywhere"	Anderson	2:20

== Personnel ==
All credits are adapted from the liner notes of With Love, from Lynn.

Musical and technical personnel

- Lynn Anderson – lead vocals
- Tom McEntee – liner notes
- Al Pachucki – engineering
- Slim Williamson – producer
- Bill Vandevort – engineering

== Chart performance ==
Chart (1969)	Peak position
US Billboard 200	197
US Top Country Albums (Billboard)	22

== Release history ==
Region	Date	Format	Label	Ref.
United States	March 1969	Vinyl	Chart Records	
United States	2010s	Music download	Sony Music Entertainment	
