= Lynn Anderson with Strings =

Compilation album by Lynn Anderson
- Released: February 1971
- Genre: Country; Nashville Sound
- Label: Chart
- Producer: Slim Williamson

Lynn Anderson chronology
Lynn Anderson's Greatest Hits, Vol. 1 (1971)	Lynn Anderson with Strings (1971)	You're My Man (1971)

Lynn Anderson with Strings is a compilation album by American country artist Lynn Anderson. It was released in February 1971 on Chart Records and was produced by Slim Williamson. Ten tracks were included on the compilation and were all accompanied by string instruments (hence the album's title).

== Background, release and reception ==
Lynn Anderson with Strings included material that Anderson had recorded for the Chart record company. While she recorded a variety of material, several of her songs included a full orchestra backed by string instruments. The songs chosen for the package all featured a full orchestra with such string instruments included. These sessions had been produced by Slim Williamson, Anderson's longtime producer at the Chart label.

A total of ten tracks comprised the package. One of these songs was composed by Liz Anderson, the mother of Lynn Anderson. In addition, only four of the album's tracks were previously released as singles: "Where's the Playground, Bobby?," "Big Girls Don't Cry," "Too Much of You" and "He Even Woke Me Up to Say Goodbye."

Lynn Anderson with Strings was released in February 1971 via Chart Records. It was Anderson's fourth compilation issued in her music career and among her last to be released from the label. The album was issued as a vinyl LP, containing five songs on each side. The same year, the album was also released as an audio cassette with the same track listing. The album was later reviewed by Allmusic, which only gave the record 2.5 out of 5 possible stars.

== Track listing ==
Side one
No.	Title	Writer(s)	Length
1.	"Where's the Playground, Bobby?"	Jim Webb	2:39
2.	"Too Much of You"	Gene Hood	2:20
3.	"Partly Bill"	Steve Allen; Vince Bulla	2:37
4.	"Big Girls Don't Cry"	Liz Anderson	2:26
5.	"The Pillow That Whispers"	Cal Veale	2:47

Side two
No.	Title	Writer(s)	Length
1.	"Love of the Common People"	John Hurley and Ronnie Wilkins	2:47
2.	"Sing Me a Sad Song"	Wynn Stewart	2:17
3.	"He Even Woke Me Up to Say Goodbye"	Doug Gilmore; Mickey Newbury	2:40
4.	"There Oughta Be a Law"	Joe Gibson	2:20
5.	"A Million Shades of Blue"	Hood	2:18

== Personnel ==
All credits are adapted from the liner notes of Lynn Anderson with Strings.

Musical and technical personnel

- Lynn Anderson – lead vocals
- Bill Purcell – strings
- Slim Williamson – producer

== Release history ==
Region	Date	Format	Label	Ref.
United States	February 1971	Cassette	Chart Records	
United States	February 1971	Vinyl	Chart Records	
