= List of awards and nominations received by Lynn Anderson =

Lynn Anderson awards and nominations
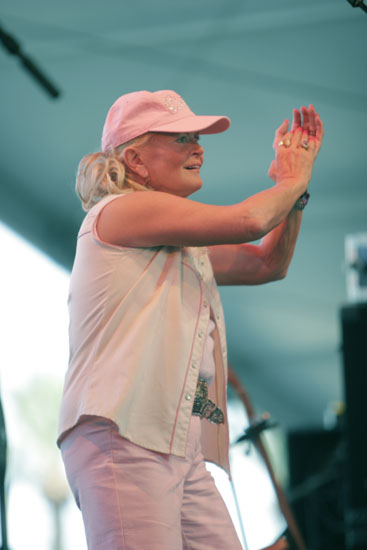
- Anderson live in concert, 2000's
Awards and nominations
| Award | Wins | Nominations |
| Billboard | 3 | 0 |
| Academy of Country Music | 2 | 6 |
| Country Music Association | 1 | 7 |
| Grammy Awards | 1 | 5 |
| People's Choice Awards | 1 | 0 |

Totals (Note: Certain award groups do not simply award one winner. They acknowledge several different recipients, have runners-up, and have third place. Since this is a specific recognition and is different from losing an award, runner-up mentions are considered wins in this award tally. For simplification and to avoid errors, each award in this list has been presumed to have had a prior nomination.)
- Wins: 11+
- Nominations: 15+

American country artist and equestrian Lynn Anderson has received more than 11 awards and 15 nominations. Her first industry award was in 1967 when the Academy of Country Music named her their "Top Female Vocalist." She would later win the same award in 1970 after several more years of nominations from the organization. With the success of Anderson's 1970 crossover hit, "Rose Garden," she won many major awards, including a Grammy Award. That year, Anderson won the organization's Best Female Country Vocal Performance accolade. She would be nominated for four additional awards during her career, with most recent in 2004.

"Rose Garden"'s success also helped Anderson win the "Female Vocalist of the Year" award from the Country Music Association Awards. She continued having major success as a country artist, which led to several more awards. This included winning "Favorite Female Country Artist" from the American Music Awards in 1974. In later years she was recognized for her legacy as an artist. In 2019, Anderson was inducted into the Western Music Association Hall of Fame.

== Academy of Country Music Awards ==
| Year | Nominee / work | Award | Result | Ref. |
|---|---|---|---|---|
| 1967 | Lynn Anderson | Television Personality of the Year | Nominated | |
| 1967 | Lynn Anderson | Top Female Vocalist | Won | |
| 1969 | Lynn Anderson | Top Female Vocalist | Nominated | |
| 1970 | "Rose Garden" | Single Record of the Year | Nominated | |
| 1970 | "Rose Garden" | Song of the Year | Nominated | |
| 1970 | Lynn Anderson | Top Female Vocalist | Won | |
| 1971 | Lynn Anderson | Top Female Vocalist | Nominated | |

== American Music Awards ==
| Year | Nominee / work | Award | Result | Ref. |
|---|---|---|---|---|
| 1974 | Lynn Anderson | Favorite Female Country Artist | Won | |

== Billboard magazine ==
| Year | Nominee / work | Award | Result | Ref. |
|---|---|---|---|---|
| 1971 | Rose Garden | Best Album | Won | |
| 1971 | Lynn Anderson | Best Female Artist | Won | |
| 1971 | Lynn Anderson | Best Female Vocalist | Won | |

== Country Music Association Awards ==
| Year | Nominee / work | Award | Result | Ref. |
|---|---|---|---|---|
| 1967 | Lynn Anderson | Female Vocalist of the Year | Nominated | |
| 1968 | Lynn Anderson | Female Vocalist of the Year | Nominated | |
| 1969 | Lynn Anderson | Female Vocalist of the Year | Nominated | |
| 1970 | Lynn Anderson | Female Vocalist of the Year | Nominated | |
| 1971 | Rose Garden | Album of the Year | Nominated | |
| 1971 | Lynn Anderson | Female Vocalist of the Year | Won | |
| 1971 | "Rose Garden" | Single of the Year | Nominated | |

== Grammy Awards ==
| Year | Nominee / work | Award | Result | Ref. |
|---|---|---|---|---|
| 1969 | "Big Girls Don't Cry" | Best Female Country Vocal Performance | Nominated | |
| 1970 | "That's a No No" | Best Female Country Vocal Performance | Nominated | |
| 1971 | "Rose Garden" | Best Female Country Vocal Performance | Won | |
| 1972 | "How Can I Unlove You" | Best Female Country Vocal Performance | Nominated | |
| 2004 | The Bluegrass Sessions | Best Bluegrass Album | Nominated | |

== People's Choice Awards ==
| Year | Nominee / work | Award | Result | Ref. |
|---|---|---|---|---|
| 1975 | Lynn Anderson | Favorite Country Artist | Won | |

== Record World ==
| Year | Nominee / work | Award | Result | Ref. |
|---|---|---|---|---|
| 1970 | Lynn Anderson | Top Female Vocalist | Nominated | |
| 1980 | Lynn Anderson | Artist of the Decade (1970–1980) | Won | |

== Western Music Association ==
| Year | Nominee / work | Award | Result | Ref. |
|---|---|---|---|---|
| 2019 | Lynn Anderson | Induction into the Hall of Fame | Won | |
