= Flower of Love =

Compilation album by Lynn Anderson
- Released: November 1973
- Genre: Country; Nashville Sound
- Label: Pickwick
- Producer: Slim Williamson

Lynn Anderson chronology
| Top of the World (1973) | Flower of Love (1973) | It Makes You Happy (1974) |

Flower of Love is a compilation budget album by American country artist Lynn Anderson. It was released circa 1971 via Pickwick Records but is often credited as a 1973 release, the year of its release on 8 track tape and was produced by Slim Williamson. It was her first compilation release for the Pickwick label, reissues of songs Anderson recorded at Chart Records during her years at the label.

== Background, release and reception ==
Flower of Love featured songs Anderson originally released while recording for Chart Records in the 1960s. Most of the songs included on the compilation are cover versions of the originals by other artists. Examples of this include the title hit by Leon Ashley, Connie Smith's "Once a Day," Tammy Wynette's "Stand by Your Man," Dottie West's "Paper Mansions" and Merle Haggard's "Okie from Muskogee." In the original recording sessions, these songs were produced by Slim Williamson, Anderson's longtime producer at Chart. A total of ten tracks were included on the album. Anderson's mother, Liz Anderson, was the composer of "Lie a Little" and a "Penny for Your Thoughts."

Greg Adams of Allmusic, who gave it 2.5 out of 5 stars. He found the package to be a "budget" release and found some cover versions to be "too close to the originals." "Because these songs are duplicated on earlier albums, Flower of Love is of limited value," he concluded.

== Track listing ==
Side one
| No. | Title | Writer(s) | Length |
|---|---|---|---|
| 1. | "Flower of Love" | Leon Ashley | 2:15 |
| 2. | "A Million Shades of Blue" | Gene Hood | 2:18 |
| 3. | "Games People Play" | Joe South | 2:42 |
| 4. | "Lie a Little" | Liz Anderson | 2:25 |
| 5. | "There Oughta Be a Law" | Joe Gibson | 2:40 |

Side two
| No. | Title | Writer(s) | Length |
|---|---|---|---|
| 1. | "Okie from Muskogee" | Merle Haggard | 2:35 |
| 2. | "Once a Day" | Bill Anderson | 2:23 |
| 3. | "Stand by Your Man" | Billy Sherrill; Tammy Wynette | 2:27 |
| 4. | "Paper Mansions" | Ted Harris | 3:06 |
| 5. | "A Penny for Your Thoughts" | Anderson | 2:30 |

== Personnel ==
All credits are adapted from the liner notes of Flower of Love.

Musical and technical personnel

- Lynn Anderson – lead vocals
- John Sturdivant, Jr. – liner notes
- Slim Williamson – producer

== Release history ==
| Region | Date | Format | Label | Ref. |
|---|---|---|---|---|
| United States | November 1973 | Vinyl | Pickwick Records | |
| Canada | November 1973 | Vinyl | Pickwick Records | |
