= Ride, Ride, Ride =

Ride, Ride, Ride may refer to:

- Ride, Ride, Ride (album), a 1967 album by Lynn Anderson
- "Ride, Ride, Ride" (Lynn Anderson song), 1966
- "Ride, Ride, Ride" (George Birge and Luke Bryan song), 2026
