= Uptown Country Girl =

Studio album by Lynn Anderson
- Released: February 1970
- Recorded: November 1969
- Studio: RCA Victor (Nashville, Tennessee)
- Genre: Country; Nashville Sound
- Length: 24:28
- Label: Chart
- Producer: Slim Williamson

Lynn Anderson chronology
Songs That Made Country Girls Famous (1969)	Uptown Country Girl (1970)	Stay There 'Til I Get There (1970)

Singles from Uptown Country Girl
- 1. "He'd Still Love Me" Released: November 1969; 2. "I've Been Everywhere" Released: January 1970

Uptown Country Girl is a studio album by American country artist Lynn Anderson. It was released in February 1970 on Chart Records and was produced by Slim Williamson. It was Anderson's seventh studio release in her recording career and contained a total of ten tracks. Two tracks were released as singles. Both "He'd Still Love Me" and "I've Been Everywhere" became major hits on the Billboard country chart between 1969 and 1970.

== Background and content ==
Uptown Country Girl was recorded in November 1969 at the RCA Victor Studio, located in Nashville, Tennessee. The sessions were produced by Slim Williamson, Anderson's longtime producer at the Chart record label. The album consisted of ten tracks, two of them previously released, "Then Go," a song written by Anderson's mother, Liz Anderson. and a cover of Hank Snow's 1962 hit "I've Been Everywhere" which Anderson recorded in 1968; the 1970 single is the same recording presented as a faux "live" performance with an introduction by an uncredited Ralph Emery added as well as canned applause. The song became a top 20 hit for Anderson and a staple in her concerts throughout her career, one of her few Chart records hits she sang for years in concert.

Additional album tracks were written by other songwriters. Two songs were recorded in the German language. Some of the songs were cover versions of country and pop hits. The album included versions of Merle Haggard's "Okie from Muskogee," the aforementioned Hank Snow's "I've Been Everywhere" and Tammy Wynette's "The Ways to Love a Man as well as a cover of a modest hit for labelmate Lawanda Lindsey, "Partly Bill"." '

== Release and reception ==
Uptown Country Girl was released in February 1970 on Chart Records and became her seventh studio record released in her career. The album was issued as a vinyl LP, containing five songs on each side of the record. The album placed on the Billboard Top Country Albums chart as well, peaking at number 29 in May 1970.

Uptown Country Girl received positive reception from critics. In February 1970, Billboard gave the record acclaim. "Lynn Anderson sings with true sincerity and true country flavor," writers stated. In later years, Allmusic gave it three out of five stars. The record included two singles that were released between 1969 and 1970. The first was "He'd Still Love Me," which was issued in November 1969. By January 1970, the song became a major hit when it reached number 15 on the Billboard Hot Country Singles chart. The second single issued was "I've Been Everywhere" in January 1970. It also became a major country hit, reaching number 16 on the country singles list in March 1970. In Canada, the song reached number 21 on the RPM Country Songs survey.

== Track listing ==
Side one
No.	Title	Writer(s)	Length
1.	"I've Been Everywhere"	Geoff Mack	2:26
2.	"He'd Still Love Me"	Hugh X. Lewis; Glenn Sutton	2:20
3.	"Wave Bye Bye to the Man"	Joe Gibson; LaWanda Lindsey	2:07
4.	"He Even Woke Me Up to Say Goodbye"	Doug Gilmore; Mickey Newbury	2:40
5.	"Morgen Wirst Du Wieder Bei Mir Sein"	Heinz Gietz; Kurt Hertha	2:16

Side two
No.	Title	Writer(s)	Length
1.	"Partly Bill"	Steve Allen; Vance Bulla	2:37
2.	"The Ways to Love a Man"	Billy Sherrill; Sutton; Tammy Wynette	2:14
3.	"Okie from Muskogee"	Merle Haggard	2:35
4.	"Then Go"	Liz Anderson	2:26
5.	"Ich Hab' Einen Boy In Germany"	Herbert Falk; Helmut Flohr	2:18

== Personnel ==
All credits are adapted from the liner notes of Uptown Country Girl.

Musical and technical personnel

- Lynn Anderson – lead vocals
- Chuck Moser – liner notes
- Don Quest – cover photo and design
- Slim Williamson – producer

== Chart performance ==
Chart (1970)	Peak position
US Top Country Albums (Billboard)	29

== Release history ==
Region	Date	Format	Label	Ref.
United States	February 1970	Vinyl	Chart Records	
Canada	February 1970	Vinyl	Chart Records	
