= No Love at All =

No Love at All may refer to:

- No Love at All (song), a 1970 song by Lynn Anderson
- No Love at All (album), a 1970 album by Lynn Anderson
