= What a Man My Man Is =

What a Man My Man Is may refer to:

- "What a Man My Man Is" (song), a 1974 single by Lynn Anderson
- What a Man My Man Is (album), a 1974 album by Lynn Anderson
