= Smile for Me =

Smile for Me may refer to:

== Music ==
- Smile for Me (album), 1974 studio album by country music singer Lynn Anderson
- "Smile for Me" (Lynn Anderson song), 1974 single by Lynn Anderson
- "Smile for Me" (The Tigers song), song composed by Barry and Maurice Gibb in 1968, and made popular by the Japanese band The Tigers
- "Smile for Me" (Massari song), 2005 single by Canadian singer Massari and featuring the rapper Loon

== Other uses ==
- Smile for Me, a 2007 Australian short film by Anna Fraser
- Smile for Me, a 2023 video game published by Serenity Forge and developed by LimboLane
