= Promises, Promises (Lynn Anderson album) =

Studio album by Lynn Anderson
- Released: December 1967
- Recorded: September 1967
- Studios: RCA Victor (Nashville, Tennessee)
- Genres: Country; Nashville sound
- Length: 30:14
- Label: Chart
- Producers: Lloyd Green; Slim Williamson

Lynn Anderson chronology
| Ride, Ride, Ride (1967) | Promises, Promises (1967) | Big Girls Don't Cry (1968) |

Singles from Promises, Promises
- 1. "Promises, Promises" Released: November 1967; 2. "No Another Time" Released: March 1968

Promises, Promises is a studio album by American country music artist Lynn Anderson. It was released in December 1967 via Chart Records. It was co-produced by Lloyd Green and Slim Williamson. The album was Anderson's second studio album issued in her recording career and contained two singles that became top ten hits on the Billboard country chart. The album also reached a high peaking positions on the Billboard country albums chart following its release.

== Background and content ==
Promises, Promises was recorded at the RCA Victor Studio in Nashville, Tennessee. The sessions were co-produced by Lloyd Green and Slim Williamson. It was Williamson who discovered Anderson and signed her to the Chart label in 1966. He had previously produced her 1967 debut studio recording. Promises, Promises was a collection of 12 tracks. Five of the album's tracks were composed by Anderson's mother, Liz Anderson. This included the title track. In her previous album, Liz Anderson had co-written several of the tunes too and was responsible for much of her daughter's early recording success. The project also included covers of Roy Orbison's "Crying", Dottie West's "Paper Mansions," Hank Snow's "I've Been Everywhere" and others. The album's liner notes were written by musical peer, Bill Anderson (no relation). "I wish I had a nickel for every time someone has come up to me and asked, 'Is Lynn Anderson your sister?'," he wrote.

== Release and reception ==
Professional ratings
Review scores
| Source | Rating |
|---|---|
| AllMusic | 2.5/5 stars |

Before the album's release, the title track was released as a single in November 1967. The song became Anderson's highest-charting single up to that point when it climbed to number four on the Billboard Hot Country Singles chart. It spent a total of 18 weeks on the chart before reaching its peak position in February 1968. A month following the single's release, the album itself was issued on the Chart label in December 1967. It was offered as a vinyl LP, containing six songs on each side of the record.

Promises, Promises became Anderson's second album to make the Billboard Top Country Albums survey. Spending 48 weeks on the list, it reached number one in May 1968. The record became one of three in her career to reach the country albums summit. The second to reach number one was her 1970 release, Rose Garden. Following the album's release and chart debut, "No Another Time" was issued as its second single in March 1968. The song became her third to become a major hit and make the Billboard country songs top ten list, peaking at number eight that June. The album received mixed reception from music writers and publications. In January 1968, Billboard gave the project a favorable review, highlighting the tracks "I've Been Everywhere" and "Love of the Common People". "Miss Anderson's start continues in the ascendancy with this, her current hit as the title and 11 other good numbers," staff writers wrote.

== Track listing ==
=== Vinyl version ===
Side one
| No. | Title | Writer(s) | Length |
|---|---|---|---|
| 1. | "Promises, Promises" | Liz Anderson; Carlyle Hughey; Wiley Smith | 1:56 |
| 2. | "The Worst Is Yet to Come" | Anderson; Casey Anderson | 2:43 |
| 3. | "No Another Time" | Jerry Lane; Slim Williamson | 2:00 |
| 4. | "Crying" | Joe Melson; Roy Orbison | 2:38 |
| 5. | "Love of the Common People" | John Hurley and Ronnie Wilkins | 2:47 |
| 6. | "A Penny for Your Thoughts" | L. Anderson | 2:30 |

Side two
| No. | Title | Writer(s) | Length |
|---|---|---|---|
| 1. | "I've Been Everywhere" | Geoff Mack | 2:23 |
| 2. | "Paper Mansions" | Ted Harris | 3:06 |
| 3. | "Two Rolls of Scotch Tape" | Betty Jo Gibson | 1:56 |
| 4. | "Sing Me a Sad Song" | Wynn Stewart | 3:17 |
| 5. | "A Hundred Times Today" | L. Anderson | 2:24 |
| 6. | "Lie a Little" | L. Anderson | 2:25 |

=== Digital version ===
Promises, Promises (2009 version)
| No. | Title | Writer(s) | Length |
|---|---|---|---|
| 1. | "Promises, Promises" | L. Anderson; Hughey; Smith | 1:56 |
| 2. | "The Worst Is Yet to Come" | L. Anderson; C. Anderson | 2:43 |
| 3. | "No Another Time" | Lane; Williamson | 2:00 |
| 4. | "Crying" | Melson; Orbison | 2:38 |
| 5. | "Love of the Common People" | Hurley; Wilkins | 2:47 |
| 6. | "A Penny for Your Thoughts" | L. Anderson | 2:30 |
| 7. | "I've Been Everywhere" | Mack | 2:23 |
| 8. | "Paper Mansions" | Harris | 3:06 |
| 9. | "Two Rolls of Scotch Tape" | Gibson | 1:56 |
| 10. | "Sing Me a Sad Song" | Stewart | 3:17 |
| 11. | "A Hundred Times Today" | L. Anderson | 2:24 |
| 12. | "Lie a Little" | L. Anderson | 2:25 |

== Personnel ==
All credits are adapted from the liner notes of Promises, Promises.

Musical and technical personnel

- Bill Anderson – liner notes
- Lynn Anderson – lead vocals
- Lloyd Green – producer
- Jim Malloy – engineering
- Slim Williamson – producer

== Chart performance ==
| Chart (1967–1968) | Peak position |
|---|---|
| US Top Country Albums (Billboard) | 1 |

== Release history ==
| Region | Date | Format | Label | Ref. |
|---|---|---|---|---|
| Canada | December 1967 | Vinyl | RCA Victor Records | |
| United States | December 1967 | Vinyl | Chart Records | |
| United States | April 28, 2009 | Music download | Blaricum CD Company | |
