= At Home with Lynn =

Studio album by Lynn Anderson
- Released: July 1969
- Recorded: May 1969
- Studio: RCA Victor (Nashville, Tennessee)
- Genre: Country; Nashville Sound
- Length: 28:45
- Label: Chart
- Producer: Slim Williamson

Lynn Anderson chronology
With Love, from Lynn (1969)	At Home with Lynn (1969)	Songs That Made Country Girls Famous (1969)

Singles from At Home with Lynn
- 1. "Where's the Playground, Bobby?" Released: May 1969; 2. "That's a No No" Released: July 1969

At Home with Lynn is a studio album by American country artist Lynn Anderson. It was released in July 1969, on Chart Records and was produced by Slim Williamson. It was Anderson's fifth studio recording in her music career and contained a total of 12 tracks. At Home with Lynn was one of three studio albums she issued in 1969 and it spawned two singles. The second single, "That's a No No," became a major hit on the American and Canadian country charts in 1969. The album itself would also reach peak positions.

== Background and content ==
At Home with Lynn was recorded in May 1969 at the RCA Victor Studio, located in Nashville, Tennessee. The album's sessions were produced by Slim Williamson, whom had been working with Anderson since the beginning of her music career in 1966. The album was a collection of 12 tracks. Two of the album's songs were written by her mother, Liz Anderson. Her mother also wrote the album's liner notes. According to her mother, the album's cover photographs were taken at Lynn's home in various rooms (hence the album name). Although Liz Anderson wrote material, Lynn also covered songs that had previously been hits by other artists. Among these songs was Billie Jo Spears' "Mr. Walker It's All Over," The Osborne Brothers's "Rocky Top," Tammy Wynette's "Singing My Song" and Joe South's "Games People Play."

== Release and reception ==
Professional ratings
Review scores
Source	Rating
Allmusic	2.5/5 stars
Billboard	Favorable

At Home with Lynn was released in July 1969, becoming her fifth studio album and third issued in 1969. The album was issued as a vinyl LP, containing six songs on each side of the record. The album received mixed reception by reviewers. In 1969, Billboard magazine gave the album a positive response. "Lynn Anderson has made a name for herself in the country music field, and she maintains that place with this powerful package," writers commented. In later years, Allmusic gave the album a less favorable review, only rating it 2.5 out of 5 possible stars. Despite mixed review, the album reached major positions on music publications. It spent a total of 17 weeks on the Billboard Top Country Albums before peaking at number 19 in October 1969.

Two singles were originally included on the album. The first was "Where's the Playground, Bobby" (an answer song to Glen Campbell's "Where's the Playground Susie"), which was released in May 1969. The single failed to chart. In July 1969, "That's a No No" was issued as the album's second single and became Anderson's biggest hit to date, reaching number two on the Billboard Hot Country Singles chart. The song also reached the same position on the RPM Country Singles chart in Canada. In addition, the album also included two singles that would later be released as singles: "I'm Alright" and "Rocky Top." However, these singles would be spawned from Anderson's 1970 album, I'm Alright.

== Track listing ==
Side one
No.	Title	Writer(s)	Length
1.	"Where's the Playground, Bobby?"	Jim Webb	2:39
2.	"Take Me Home"	Joe Gibson	2:27
3.	"Games People Play"	Joe South	2:42
4.	"Singing My Song"	Billy Sherrill; Glenn Sutton; Tammy Wynette	2:22
5.	"I'm Alright"	Bill Anderson	2:35
6.	"Full House"	Buckely Maxwell; Sutton	1:57

Side two
No.	Title	Writer(s)	Length
1.	"Rocky Top"	Felice and Boudleaux Bryant	2:37
2.	"If Silence Is Golden"	Liz Anderson	2:32
3.	"Mr. Walker, It's All Over"	Gene Crysler	2:57
4.	"Jim Dandy"	Lincoln Chase	1:58
5.	"That's a No No"	Ben Peters	2:00
6.	"I Used to Know All Those Things"	Anderson	2:15

== Personnel ==
All credits are adapted from the liner notes of At Home with Lynn.

Musical and technical personnel

- Lynn Anderson – lead vocals
- Liz Anderson – liner notes
- Slim Williamson – producer

== Chart performance ==
Chart (1969)	Peak position
US Top Country Albums (Billboard)	19

== Release history ==
Region	Date	Format	Label	Ref.
United States	July 1969	Vinyl	Chart Records	
Canada	July 1969	Vinyl	Chart Records	
