= Mother may I =

Mother may I may refer to:

== Game ==
- Mother May I?, a children's game, also known as "Captain May I?" and "Father May I?"

== Music ==
- Mother May I (band), an alternative rock band from Washington, DC that was active between 1990 and 2001
- "Mother May I" (song), a song from CeeLo Green's fifth studio album Heart Blanche
- "Mother May I", a song from the Coheed and Cambria 2005 album Good Apollo, I'm Burning Star IV, Volume One: From Fear Through the Eyes of Madness
- "Mother May I", a song from The Jealous Girlfriends 2005 album Comfortably Uncomfortable
- "Mother May I?", a song from the Northern State 2007 album Can I Keep This Pen?
