= I'm Alright (Lynn Anderson song) =

Single by Lynn Anderson

from the album I'm Alright
- B-side: "Pick of the Week"
- Released: October 1970
- Recorded: 1969
- Studio: RCA Victor (Nashville, Tennessee)
- Genre: Country; Nashville Sound
- Length: 2:41
- Label: Chart
- Songwriter: Bill Anderson
- Producer: Slim Williamson

Lynn Anderson singles chronology
| "No Love at All" (1970) | "I'm Alright" (1970) | "Rose Garden" (1970) |

"I'm Alright" is a song written by Bill Anderson that was recorded by American country music artist Lynn Anderson. It was released as a single in October 1970 via Chart Records.

== Background and release ==
"I'm Alright" was recorded at the RCA Victor Studio in 1969, located in Nashville, Tennessee. The sessions was produced by Slim Williamson, Anderson's producer while recording for the Chart label.

"I'm Alright" reached number 20 on the Billboard Hot Country Singles chart in 1970. It was Anderson's eighth major hit single as a recording artist. It also became a minor hit on the Canadian RPM Country Songs chart, reaching number 37 in 1970. The song was issued on Anderson's 1969 studio album, I'm Alright.

== Track listings ==
7" vinyl single

- "I'm Alright" – 2:00
- "Pick of the Week" – 2:30

== Chart performance ==
| Chart (1970) | Peak position |
|---|---|
| Canada Country Songs (RPM) | 37 |
| US Hot Country Songs (Billboard) | 20 |
