= He'd Still Love Me =

Single by Lynn Anderson

from the album Uptown Country Girl
- B-side: "All You Add is Love"
- Released: November 1969
- Recorded: 1969
- Studio: RCA Victor (Nashville, Tennessee)
- Genre: Country; Nashville Sound
- Length: 2:20
- Label: Chart
- Songwriter(s): Hugh X. Lewis; Glenn Sutton
- Producer(s): Slim Williamson

Lynn Anderson singles chronology
"That's a No No" (1969)	"He'd Still Love Me" (1969)	"I've Been Everywhere" (1970)

"He'd Still Love Me" is a song written by Hugh X. Lewis and Glenn Sutton. It was recorded by American country music artist Lynn Anderson and released as a single in November 1969 via Chart Records.

== Background and release ==
"He'd Still Love Me" was recorded at the RCA Victor Studio in 1969, located in Nashville, Tennessee. The sessions was produced by Slim Williamson, Anderson's producer while recording for the Chart label.

"He'd Still Love Me" reached number 15 on the Billboard Hot Country Singles chart in 1969. It was Anderson's eighth major hit single as a recording artist. The song was issued on Anderson's 1969 studio album, Uptown Country Girl.

== Track listings ==
7" vinyl single

- "That's a No No" – 2:00
- "If Silence Is Golden" – 2:30

== Chart performance ==
Chart (1969–1970)	Peak position
US Hot Country Songs (Billboard)	15
