= I'm Alright (Lynn Anderson album) =

Studio album by Lynn Anderson
- Released: September 1970
- Recorded: November 1969
- Studio: RCA Victor (Nashville, Tennessee)
- Genre: Country; Nashville Sound
- Label: Chart
- Producer: Slim Williamson

Lynn Anderson chronology
No Love at All (1970)	I'm Alright (1970)	Rose Garden (1970)

Singles from I'm Alright
- 1. "Rocky Top" Released: April 1970; 2. "I'm Alright" Released: October 1970

I'm Alright is a studio album by American country artist Lynn Anderson. It was released in September 1970 on Chart Records and was produced by Slim Williamson. I'm Alright was Anderson's tenth studio recording and her final studio release for the Chart label. It included two singles that became major radio hits in 1970. Both "Rocky Top" and the title track reached the Billboard country charts that year.

== Background and content ==
I'm Alright was recorded in November 1969 at the RCA Victor Studio in Nashville, Tennessee. The sessions were produced by Slim Williamson, who was Anderson's long time record producer at the Chart label. The record consisted of ten tracks. The album's final track, "If the Creeks Don't Rise," was composed by Anderson's mother Liz Anderson. It also included a composition by Joe South called "Down in the Boondocks." The latter composition was first a hit by Billy Joe Royal. The album also included cover versions of Georgia Gibbs's "Seven Lonely Days" and Glen Campbell's "Try a Little Kindness." The album's title track was an original recording composed by Bill Anderson. He also wrote the album's liner notes.

== Release and reception ==
Professional ratings
Review scores
Source	Rating
Billboard	Favorable

I'm Alright was released in September 1970 on Chart Records. It was her tenth album recording and her final studio record issued on the Chart label. The project was issued as a vinyl LP, with five songs featured on each side of the record. I'm Alright charted on the Billboard Top Country Albums survey upon its release. In November 1970, it reached a peak position of 33 on the chart. The album was reviewed positively by Billboard as well. The writers praised Anderson's cover versions included on the album as well as the original compositions. "The top stylist offers another fine package of strong material," they wrote.

The first single release from the project was Anderson's cover of "Rocky Top" in April 1969. The song became a major hit on the Billboard Hot Country Singles chart that year after reaching the top 20. It eventually peaked at number 17. The title track was spawned as the album's second single in October 1970. The song reached number 20 on the Billboard country songs chart after 11 weeks on the list. In addition, both singles reached top 40 positions on the Canadian RPM Country Singles chart.

== Track listing ==
Side one
No.	Title	Writer(s)	Length
1.	"I'm Alright"	Bill Anderson	2:35
2.	"Love Me, Love Me"	George Richey; Glenn Sutton	2:29
3.	"Try a Little Kindness"	Bobby Austin; Curt Sapaugh	2:34
4.	"My Friend"	Bill Dees; Roy Orbison	2:41
5.	"Haunted House"	Robert Geddins	2:31

Side two
No.	Title	Writer(s)	Length
1.	"Rocky Top"	Felice and Boudleaux Bryant	2:37
2.	"Seven Lonely Days"	Marshall Brown; Alden Shuman; Earl Shuman	2:12
3.	"Down in the Boondocks"	Joe South	2:07
4.	"The Pillow That Whispers"	Cal Veale	2:42
5.	"If the Creeks Don't Rise"	Liz Anderson	1:53

== Personnel ==
All credits are adapted from the liner notes of I'm Alright.

Musical and technical personnel

- Bill Anderson – liner notes
- Lynn Anderson – lead vocals
- Don Quest – cover photo and design
- Slim Williamson – producer

== Chart performance ==
Chart (1970)	Peak position
US Top Country Albums (Billboard)	33

== Release history ==
Region	Date	Format	Label	Ref.
United States	September 1970	Vinyl	Chart Records	
