= Too Much of You =

Single by Lynn Anderson

from the album Ride, Ride, Ride
- B-side: "If This is Love"
- Released: July 1967
- Recorded: 1968
- Studio: RCA Victor (Nashville, Tennessee)
- Genre: Country; Nashville Sound
- Length: 2:20
- Label: Chart
- Songwriter: Gene Hood
- Producer: Slim Williamson

Lynn Anderson singles chronology
"If I Kiss You (Will You Go Away)" (1967)	"Too Much of You" (1967)	"Promises, Promises" (1967)

"Too Much of You" is a song written by Gene Hood that was recorded by American country music artist Lynn Anderson. It was released as a single in July 1967 via Chart Records.

== Background and release ==
"Too Much of You" was recorded at the RCA Victor Studio in January 1967, located in Nashville, Tennessee. The sessions was produced by Slim Williamson, Anderson's producer while recording for the Chart label. Five additional tracks were cut at the same recording session, including the single's B-side "If This Is Love."

"Too Much of You" was released as a single in July 1967 via Chart Records. It spent a total of 13 weeks on the Billboard Hot Country Singles chart before reaching number 28 in October 1967. It was Anderson's third single to reach into the top 40 of the country songs chart. The song was issued on Anderson's 1967 studio album, Ride, Ride, Ride. This was Anderson's debut studio recording.

== Track listings ==
7" vinyl single

- "Too Much of You" – 2:20
- "If This Is Love" – 2:14

== Chart performance ==
Chart (1967)	Peak position
US Hot Country Songs (Billboard)	28
