= Stay There 'Til I Get There =

Studio album by Lynn Anderson
- Released: May 1970
- Recorded: January 1970
- Studio: Columbia (Nashville, Tennessee)
- Genre: Country; Countrypolitan
- Length: 27:04
- Label: Columbia
- Producer: Glenn Sutton

Lynn Anderson chronology
| Uptown Country Girl (1970) | Stay There 'Til I Get There (1970) | Songs My Mother Wrote (Lynn Anderson Sings Liz Anderson) (1970) |

Singles from Stay There 'Til I Get There
- 1. "Stay There, Till I Get There" Released: February 1970

Stay There 'Til I Get There is a studio album by American country artist Lynn Anderson. It was released in May 1970 on Columbia Records and was produced by Glenn Sutton. The album was Anderson's eighth studio recording as a music artist and was her first album for the Columbia label. The album's title track was released as a single and became her fifth top ten hit on the Billboard country chart. The album itself would also chart on a similar country survey.

== Background and content ==
Stay There 'Til I Get There was recorded in January 1970 at the Columbia Studios, located in Nashville, Tennessee. The sessions were produced by Glenn Sutton. It was Anderson's first production assignment with Sutton, who also became her first husband. The pair would collaborate frequently during her career at Columbia. Sutton would not only record her but also compose several of her biggest hits. Three of the album's songs were penned by Sutton, including the record's title track. Also included was a composition written by her mother, Liz Anderson. Cover versions of songs recorded by other artists are also featured in the album's eleven tracks. Cover versions included Glen Campbell's "Honey Come Back," Ian Tyson's "Someday Soon," Sonny James's "True Love's a Blessing," and Bobbie Gentry's "Fancy."

== Release and reception ==
Professional ratings
Review scores
| Source | Rating |
|---|---|
| Allmusic | 3/5 stars |

Stay There 'Til I Get There was released in May 1970 on Columbia Records, becoming her eighth studio album. The album was issued as a vinyl LP, containing six tracks on "side one" and five songs on "side two." It was later issued through digital retailers. Stay There 'Til I Get There peaked at number 28 on the Billboard Top Country Albums chart after spending 17 weeks there. Greg Adams of Allmusic gave the project three out of five possible stars in his review. Adams compared the record to her earlier work at Chart Records, connecting its traditional instrumentation to her former hit singles. "...those who enjoy her early straight country recordings will also enjoy this first album for Columbia," Adams concluded.

The album's only single release was the title track. It was released as a single in February 1970. The song became Anderson's fifth top ten hit as a music artist, peaking at number seven on the Billboard Hot Country Singles chart in May 1970. It also charted on the Canadian RPM Country Songs chart where it peaked at number 22.

== Track listing ==
=== Vinyl version ===
Side one
| No. | Title | Writer(s) | Length |
|---|---|---|---|
| 1. | "Stay There, Till I Get There" | Glenn Sutton | 2:08 |
| 2. | "Words" | Barry, Robin & Maurice Gibb | 3:00 |
| 3. | "Country Girl" | Margaret Lewis; Myra Smith | 2:31 |
| 4. | "When You Hurt Me More Than I Love You" | Jerry Foster | 2:09 |
| 5. | "Don't Leave the Lovin' Up to Me" | Liz Anderson | 2:18 |
| 6. | "Good" | Billy Sherrill; Sutton | 2:19 |

Side two
| No. | Title | Writer(s) | Length |
|---|---|---|---|
| 1. | "True Love's a Blessing" | Sonny James; Carole Smith | 2:14 |
| 2. | "I'd Run a Mile to You" | Mac Curtis; Sutton | 2:19 |
| 3. | "Honey Come Back" | Jim Webb | 2:50 |
| 4. | "Fancy" | Bobbie Gentry | 3:13 |
| 5. | "Someday Soon" | Ian Tyson | 2:16 |

=== Digital version ===
Stay There 'Til I Get There
| No. | Title | Writer(s) | Length |
|---|---|---|---|
| 1. | "Stay There, Till I Get There" | Sutton | 2:08 |
| 2. | "Words" | Barry, Robin & Maurice Gibb | 3:00 |
| 3. | "Country Girl" | Margaret Lewis; Myra Smith | 2:31 |
| 4. | "When You Hurt Me More Than I Love You" | Jerry Foster | 2:09 |
| 5. | "Don't Leave the Lovin' Up to Me" | Anderson | 2:18 |
| 6. | "Good" | Sherrill; Sutton | 2:19 |
| 7. | "True Love's a Blessing" | James; Carole Smith | 2:14 |
| 8. | "I'd Run a Mile to You" | Curtis; Sutton | 2:19 |
| 9. | "Honey Come Back" | Webb | 2:50 |
| 10. | "Fancy" | Gentry | 3:13 |
| 11. | "Someday Soon" | Tyson | 2:16 |

== Personnel ==
All credits are adapted from the liner notes of Stay There 'Til I Get There.

Musical and technical personnel

- Lynn Anderson – lead vocals
- Charlie Bragg – engineering
- Cam Mullins – arrangement
- Glenn Sutton – producer

== Chart performance ==
| Chart (1970) | Peak position |
|---|---|
| US Top Country Albums (Billboard) | 28 |

== Release history ==
| Region | Date | Format | Label | Ref. |
|---|---|---|---|---|
| Canada | May 1970 | Vinyl | Columbia Records | |
| United States | May 1970 | Vinyl | Columbia Records | |
| United States | 2010s | Music download | Sony Music Entertainment | |
