= Kenny Vernon =

American singer-songwriter

- Born: Henry Kenneth Vernon; July 19, 1940 (age 85)
- Origin: Jackson, Tennessee, United States
- Genres: Country, Bakersfield sound, country rock, outlaw country,
- Occupation: singer/songwriter
- Instruments: Vocals, guitar
- Years active: 1959–present
- Labels: Capitol Records, Epic, Chart label
- Formerly of: the Strangers

Kenny Vernon (born July 19, 1940) is an American country music singer-songwriter and guitar player often associated with the Bakersfield country music scene and an early participant of the country rock and outlaw country movements. In addition to his own career as an artist, Vernon was also a longtime friend of Merle Haggard and a member of the Strangers.

As a child, Vernon was inspired by his older brother Roy, who hosted a country music radio show in Jackson, Tennessee. It was not uncommon for touring artists to drop in at the Vernon's home, often playing impromptu sessions in the house or yard. During the late 1950s, Vernon began performing and writing songs as a regional act. Vernon later relocated to California during the early 1960s, where he honed his craft as a professional performer and bandleader. Vernon's primary band on the West Coast was called The Boondockers.

Vernon met Merle Haggard during the early 1960s and the two developed a close friendship. Vernon performed as a member of Haggard's band, The Strangers until Haggard retired from performing in early 2016, due to illness.

In addition to touring and performing as a solo artist, Vernon recorded albums and singles for Capitol Records, Epic and Chart label. He was paired with a young female singer named Lawanda Lindsey, who was a protege of Buck Owens. Vernon and Lindsey released a number of duets, both as singles and albums. Vernon also participated in the country rock scene, recording an album in 1967 entitled Loversville, with members of The Flying Burrito Brothers and The Byrds.

Vernon received an endorsement from Fender, with the Fender Telecaster, Fender Stratocaster and Fender Coronado models as his primary choice for electric guitars. In 1968, Vernon also endorsed a banjo made by Fender, which he often included in his live sets.

During the mid-1960s, Vernon and his band played a resident gig at the Golden Nugget, which lasted nearly fifteen years. In between these performances in Las Vegas, Vernon continued to record new material and frequently traveled with his band to perform in other cities. After his residency gig ended, Vernon relocated to New Mexico, where he focused on private business ventures and performing tour dates with The Strangers. On October 9, 2003, Vernon performed with Merle Haggard and The Strangers on Late Show with David Letterman.

As a member of The Strangers, Vernon played rhythm guitar and contributed background vocals on the live album Willie Merle & Ray: Big Hits Live From The Last Of The Breed Tour, which was released on CD and DVD in 2009. This revue tour was in support of the 2007 collaborative album Last of the Breed and featured Merle Haggard, Willie Nelson and Ray Price with Ray Benson and Asleep at the Wheel. Vernon is seen onstage contributing background vocals and playing his red Fender Telecaster standing next to Theresa Haggard on stage left.

In 2015, the song "Sweet Jesus," was recorded by The Oak Ridge Boys. Vernon co-wrote the song with Merle Haggard and it won the GMA Dove Awards for Country Song of the Year. The studio recording of this song appears on The Oak Ridge Boys' studio album, Rock of Ages, Hymns and Gospel Favorites.

Today, Vernon tours with The Kenny Vernon & Friends Classic Country Tour, performing concerts throughout North America and in parts of Europe, where classic country music remains popular. Recently, Vernon has appeared in Branson and is also a guest performer on the RFD-TV cable television Network.

Kenny has relocated to his original town in West Tennessee, Jackson.
