= Mother, May I (song) =

Single by Liz Anderson and Lynn Anderson
- B-side: "Better Than Life Without You"
- Released: February 1968
- Recorded: January 2, 1968
- Studio: RCA Victor Studio
- Genre: Country; Nashville Sound
- Length: 2:02
- Label: RCA Victor
- Songwriter(s): Liz Anderson; Lynn Anderson
- Producer(s): Felton Jarvis

Lynn Anderson singles chronology
"Promises, Promises" (1967)	"Mother, May I" (1968)	"No Another Time" (1968)

Liz Anderson singles chronology
"Thanks a Lot for Tryin' Anyway" (1967)	"Mother, May I" (1968)	"Like a Merry-Go-Round" (1968)

"Mother, May I" is a song written and recorded by American country music artists Liz Anderson and Lynn Anderson. The song was recorded as a duet between mother and daughter. It was released as a single in 1968 via RCA Records.

== Background and release ==
"Mother, May I" was recorded at the RCA Victor Studio in January 1968, located in Nashville, Tennessee. The sessions was produced by Felton Jarvis. Jarvis was Liz Anderson's record producer at RCA Victor Records. Also recorded at the same session was the song "Better Than Life Without You."

"Mother, May I" was released as a single in February 1968 via RCA Records. It spent a total of 12 weeks on the Billboard Hot Country Singles chart before reaching number 21 in April 1968. It also became a top 20 hit on the Canadian RPM Country Songs chart, reaching number 16 in 1968. "Mother, May I" was the only duet recording released as a single between the mother and daughter duo. They continued recording solo singles for their own labels for several years, and Lynn Anderson also continued recording further tracks by her mother.

== Track listings ==
7" vinyl single

- "Mother, May I" – 2:02
- "Better Than Life Without You" – 2:01

== Chart performance ==
Chart (1968)	Peak position
Canada Country Songs (RPM)	16
US Hot Country Songs (Billboard)	21
