= Ride, Ride, Ride (album) =

Studio album by Lynn Anderson
- Released: March 1967
- Recorded: April 1966 – January 1967
- Studio: RCA Victor (Nashville, Tennessee)
- Genre: Country
- Label: Chart
- Producer: Slim Williamson

Lynn Anderson chronology
Ride, Ride, Ride (1967)	Promises, Promises (1967)

Singles from Ride, Ride, Ride
- 1. "In Person" Released: June 1966; 2. "Ride, Ride, Ride" Released: October 1966; 3. "If I Kiss You (Will You Go Away)" Released: February 1967; 4. "Too Much of You" Released: July 1967

Professional ratings
Review scores
Source	Rating
AllMusic	3/5 stars

Ride, Ride, Ride is the debut studio album by American country artist Lynn Anderson. The album was released in March 1967 on Chart Records and was produced by Slim Williamson. The album spawned Anderson's four debut singles for the Chart label, as well as her first Top 10 hit on the Billboard Hot Country Singles chart "If I Kiss You (Will You Go Away)".

== Background and content ==
Ride, Ride, Ride was prepared in three separate sessions between 1966 and 1967 at the RCA Victor Studio in Nashville, Tennessee, United States. The first session took place in April 1966, which produced the album's fourth and twelfth tracks. The second session took place in August 1966 and produced tracks one, two, seven, and eleven. The final session took place in January 1967 and produced tracks three, five, six, eight, nine, and ten. The album consisted of twelve tracks. Eight of the twelve tracks were co-written by Anderson's mother, songwriter Liz Anderson, who would contribute to writing tracks on many of her other albums for the Chart label following the release of Ride, Ride, Ride. The album's fifth track, "It's Only Lonely Me", was co-written with Lynn Anderson's father Casey Anderson, who was also a songwriter at the time. Three of the four singles released from the album were written entirely by Liz Anderson except the final single "Too Much of You", which was written by Gene Woods.

Ride, Ride, Ride was originally released as an LP record, with six songs on the first side of the record and six songs on the opposite end of the record.

== Release ==
The lead single for the album entitled "In Person" was released in June 1966 but failed to chart. The title track was released as the album's second single in October 1966, peaking in the Top 40 on the Billboard Hot Country Singles chart at No. 36. The third single released was the track "If I Kiss You (Will You Go Away)" in February 1967, which became Anderson's first major hit on the Billboard country chart, reaching No. 5. The fourth and final single was the track "Too Much of You" in July 1967, which peaked at No. 28 on the Billboard country chart later in the year. The album was released in March 1967 on Chart Records and peaked at No. 25 on the Billboard Top Country Albums chart the year.

== Track listing ==
All songs were written by Liz Anderson, except where noted.

Side one
No.	Title	Writer(s)	Length
1.	"Ride, Ride, Ride"		2:00
2.	"Then Go"		2:26
3.	"Beggars Can’t Be Choosers"		2:00
4.	"In Person"		2:15
5.	"It’s Only Lonely Me"	Liz Anderson, Casey Anderson	2:31
6.	"If This Is Love"		2:14

Side two
No.	Title	Writer(s)	Length
1.	"If I Kiss You (Will You Go Away)"		2:10
2.	"Too Much of You"	Gene Hood	2:20
3.	"There Oughta Be a Law"	Betty Jo Gibson	2:40
4.	"It Makes You Happy"	Gene Woods	2:37
5.	"Tear by Tear"	Jerry Lane	2:05
6.	"My Heart Keeps Walkin’ the Floor"	Lynn Anderson	2:37

== Charts ==
Chart (1967)	Peak position
U.S. Billboard Top LPs	25
