= Stay There, Till I Get There =

Single by Lynn Anderson

from the album Stay There 'Til I Get There
- B-side: "I'd Run a Mile to You"
- Released: February 1970
- Recorded: January 1970
- Studio: Columbia (Nashville, Tennessee)
- Genre: Country; Nashville Sound
- Length: 2:17
- Label: Columbia
- Songwriter: Glenn Sutton
- Producer: Glenn Sutton

Lynn Anderson singles chronology
"I've Been Everywhere" (1970)	"Stay There, Till I Get There" (1970)	"Rocky Top" (1970)

"Stay There, Till I Get There" is a song written by Glenn Sutton. It was recorded by American country music artist Lynn Anderson and released as a single in February 1970 via Columbia Records.

== Background and release ==
"Stay There, Till I Get There" was recorded at the Columbia Studios in January 1970, located in Nashville, Tennessee. The sessions was produced by Glenn Sutton, Anderson's longtime production collaborator at the label and her first husband.

"Stay There, Till I Get There" reached number 7 on the Billboard Hot Country Singles chart in 1969. It was Anderson's fifth top ten hit single as a recording artist. It also became a minor hit on the Canadian RPM Country Songs chart, reaching number 22 in 1970. The song was issued on Anderson's 1970 studio album, Stay There 'Til I Get There.

== Track listings ==
7" vinyl single

- "Stay There, Till I Get There" – 2:17
- "I'd Run a Mile to You" – 2:06

== Chart performance ==
Chart (1970)	Peak position
Canada Country Songs (RPM)	22
US Hot Country Songs (Billboard)	7
