= Our House Is Not a Home (For It's Never Been Loved In) =

Single by Lynn Anderson

from the album With Love, from Lynn
- B-side: "Wave Bye Bye to the Man"
- Released: February 1969
- Recorded: 1968
- Studio: RCA Victor (Nashville, Tennessee)
- Genre: Country; Nashville Sound
- Length: 2:40
- Label: Chart
- Songwriter(s): Shirley Mayo; Curly Putman
- Producer(s): Slim Williamson

Lynn Anderson singles chronology
"Flattery Will Get You Everywhere" (1968)	"Our House Is Not a Home (For It's Never Been Loved In)" (1969)	"Where's the Playground, Bobby?" (1969)

"Our House Is Not a Home (For It's Never Been Loved In)" is a song written by Shirley Mayo and Curly Putman. It was recorded by American country music artist Lynn Anderson and released as a single in February 1969 via Chart Records.

== Background and release ==
"Our House Is Not a Home" was recorded at the RCA Victor Studio in 1968, located in Nashville, Tennessee. The sessions was produced by Slim Williamson, Anderson's producer while recording for the Chart label.

"Our House Is Not a Home" reached number 18 on the Billboard Hot Country Singles chart in 1969. It was Anderson's sixth major hit single as a recording artist. It also charted on the Canadian RPM Country Songs chart, reaching number three in 1969. The song was issued on Anderson's 1969 studio album, With Love, from Lynn.

== Track listings ==
7" vinyl single

- "Our House Is Not a Home (For It's Never Been Loved In)" – 2:25
- "Wave Bye Bye to the Man" – 2:07

== Chart performance ==
Chart (1968–1969)	Peak position
Canada Country Songs (RPM)	3
US Hot Country Songs (Billboard)	18
