= Ride, Ride, Ride (Lynn Anderson song) =

- German release picture sleeve

Single by Lynn Anderson

from the album Ride, Ride, Ride
- B-side: "Tear by Tear"
- Released: October 1966
- Recorded: July 1966
- Studio: RCA Victor (Nashville, Tennessee)
- Genre: Country; Nashville Sound
- Length: 2:00
- Label: Chart
- Songwriter: Liz Anderson
- Producer: Slim Williamson

Lynn Anderson singles chronology
"In Person" (1966)	"Ride, Ride, Ride" (1966)	"Keeping Up Appearances" (1967)

"Ride, Ride, Ride" is a song written by Liz Anderson that was first recorded by American country music artist Lynn Anderson. It was released as a single in October 1966 via Chart Records. It was later recorded by American pop artist Brenda Lee shortly afterward and became a top 40 single for her.

== Lynn Anderson version ==
"Ride, Ride, Ride" was recorded at the RCA Victor Studio in Nashville, Tennessee in July 1966. The sessions were produced by Slim Williamson, Anderson's producer while recording for the Chart label. It was Anderson's third official recording session in her music career. Also recorded at the same studio session was three additional tracks, including her first major hit "If I Kiss You (Will You Go Away)."

"Ride, Ride, Ride" was released as a single in October 1966. The song spent 17 weeks on the Billboard Hot Country Singles chart before reaching number 36 in January 1967. "Ride, Ride, Ride" was Anderson's first single to chart on any Billboard survey. It was also her first top 40 entry on the country songs chart. Her follow-up solo release, "If I Kiss You (Will You Go Away)," would become her first top ten hit.

=== Track listing ===
7" vinyl single

- "Ride, Ride, Ride" – 2:00
- "Tear by Tear" – 2:05

=== Chart performance ===
Chart (1966–1967)	Peak position
US Hot Country Songs (Billboard)	36

== Brenda Lee version ==
"Ride, Ride, Ride"

Single by Brenda Lee
- B-side: "Lonely People Do Foolish Things"
- Released: January 1967
- Recorded: December 15, 1966
- Studio: Bradley's Barn, Mt. Juliet, Tennessee
- Genre: Country; Nashville Sound
- Length: 1:58
- Label: Decca
- Songwriter: Liz Anderson
- Producer: Owen Bradley

Brenda Lee singles chronology
"Coming on Strong" (1966)	"Ride, Ride, Ride" (1967)	"Take Me" (1967)

"Ride, Ride, Ride" was notably recorded by Brenda Lee shortly following the release of Anderson's version to country radio. Lee's version was cut at Bradley's Barn, located in Mount Juliet, Tennessee on December 15, 1966. The sessions was produced by Owen Bradley, who was Lee's longtime producer at her record company. Three additional tracks were cut at the same recording session.

Lee's version of "Ride, Ride, Ride" was released as a single in January 1967. The song spent 17 weeks on the Billboard Hot 100 singles chart before reaching number 37 in February 1967. Although Lee's version was a top 40 success, the song was not issued on an album.

=== Track listing ===
7" vinyl single

- "Ride, Ride, Ride" – 1:58
- "Lonely People Do Foolish Things" – 3:01

=== Chart performance ===
Chart (1967)	Peak position
US Billboard Hot 100	37
