= That's a No No =

Single by Lynn Anderson

from the album At Home with Lynn
- B-side: "If Silence is Golden"
- Released: July 1969
- Recorded: May 1969
- Studio: RCA Victor (Nashville, Tennessee)
- Genre: Country; Nashville Sound
- Length: 2:00
- Label: Chart
- Songwriter(s): Ben Peters
- Producer(s): Slim Williamson

Lynn Anderson singles chronology
"Where's the Playground, Bobby?" (1969)	"That's a No No" (1969)	"He'd Still Love Me" (1969)

"That's a No No" is a song written by Ben Peters. It was recorded by American country music artist Lynn Anderson and released as a single in July 1969 via Chart Records.

== Background and release ==
"That's a No No" was recorded at the RCA Victor Studio in May 1969, located in Nashville, Tennessee. The sessions was produced by Slim Williamson, Anderson's producer while recording for the Chart label.

"That's a No No" reached number 2 on the Billboard Hot Country Singles chart in 1969. It was Anderson's seventh major hit single as a recording artist. It also became a major hit on the Canadian RPM Country Songs chart, reaching number two in 1969. The song was issued on Anderson's 1969 studio album, At Home with Lynn.

== Track listings ==
7" vinyl single

- "That's a No No" – 2:00
- "If Silence Is Golden" – 2:30

== Chart performance ==
Chart (1968–1969)	Peak position
Canada Country Songs (RPM)	2
US Hot Country Songs (Billboard)	2
