= Promises, Promises (Lynn Anderson song) =

Lynn Anderson song (1967)

- Japanese release picture sleeve

Single by Lynn Anderson

from the album Promises, Promises
- B-side: "Nothing Between Us"
- Released: 1967
- Recorded: 1967
- Genre: Country
- Length: 2:13
- Label: Chart
- Songwriters: William Smith, Carlye Hughey
- Producer: Slim Williamson

Lynn Anderson singles chronology
"Too Much of You" (1967)	"Promises, Promises" (1967)	"No Another Time" (1968)

"Promises, Promises" is the name of a country song made famous by Lynn Anderson in 1968.

"Promises, Promises" was Anderson's second major hit. The single was released in late 1967 on the Chart Records label, the distributed by RCA Victor, and was publicly debuted on The Lawrence Welk Show in an early December 1967 episode. "Promises, Promises" was Anderson's biggest hit up to that point, hitting number four on the Billboard Country chart and number one on the Cashbox Country chart. Because of the success of the song, an album of the same name was released, which was also a major seller.

== Chart performance ==
Chart (1967–1968)	Peak position
U.S. Billboard Hot Country Singles	4
