= All the King's Horses (Lynn Anderson album) =

Studio album by Lynn Anderson
- Released: 1976
- Recorded: 1976
- Genre: Country pop
- Label: Columbia
- Producer: Glenn Sutton

Lynn Anderson chronology
I've Never Loved Anyone More (1975)	All the King's Horses (1976)	Lynn Anderson's Greatest Hits, Volume II (1976)

Professional ratings
Review scores
Source	Rating
Allmusic	3/5 stars

All the King's Horses is a studio album by country entertainer Lynn Anderson, released in 1976.

Only one single (the title track) reached the top 20 on the country singles chart; the second single, a cover of John Prine's "Paradise" reached the Top 30, and a third and final single, "Rodeo Cowboy" did not chart within Top 40. Peaking at 28, the album was the first Lynn Anderson studio album to chart outside the Top 20 on country albums chart since 1970.

== Track listing ==
1. "All the King's Horses" (Johnny Cunningham)
2. "Lyin' Eyes" (Don Henley, Glenn Frey)
3. "Long, Long Time" (Gary White)
4. "If All I Have to Do Is Just Love You"
5. "Rodeo Cowboy" (Glenn Sutton)
6. "Dixieland, You Will Never Die"
7. "That's All He Wrote"
8. "Paradise" (John Prine)
9. "Tomorrow" (Liz Anderson)
10. "I Want to Be a Part of You"
