= I've Never Loved Anyone More =

Studio album by Lynn Anderson
- Released: 1975
- Recorded: 1975
- Genre: Country pop
- Label: Columbia
- Producer: Glenn Sutton

Lynn Anderson chronology
What a Man My Man Is (1974)	I've Never Loved Anyone More (1975)	All the King's Horses (1976)

Singles from I've Never Loved Anyone More
- 1. "He Turns It into Love Again" Released: February 1975; 2. "I've Never Loved Anyone More" Released: June 1975

Professional ratings
Review scores
Source	Rating
AllMusic	3/5 stars
The Encyclopedia of Popular Music	3/5 stars

I've Never Loved Anyone More is a studio album by the country singer Lynn Anderson, released in 1975. In the USA, two singles were released from the album, the title song (written by Linda Hargrove and Michael Nesmith) and "He Turns It Into Love Again". The title track reached No. 14 while "He Turns It Into Love Again" reached No. 13, becoming the first time Anderson had consecutive non-top ten singles since signing with Columbia Records in 1970. She did not return to the top ten again until 1979 with "Isn't it Always Love". The album was the only Columbia studio album of Anderson's not to be released on the cassette tape format.

The album was produced by Glenn Sutton, Anderson's husband and producer at the time, and has of 11 tracks. Two cover versions included here were hits from 1975, "Faithless Love" (a JD Souther composition best known as performed by Linda Ronstadt) and "I'm Not Lisa" (by Jessi Colter). "I've Never Loved Anyone More" was released by Linda Hargrove in 1974, a single from her album Blue Jean Country Queen.

== Critical reception ==
Billboard praised the title track, writing that it "shows some tenderness in [Anderson's] voice with an excellent song."

== Track listing ==
Side one
No.	Title	Writer(s)	Length
1.	"I've Never Loved Anyone More"	Linda Hargrove, Michael Nesmith	2:27
2.	"I'm Growing Up All Over Again"	Tommy Boyce, Janet McMahan	2:42
3.	"Faithless Love"	JD Souther	3:09
4.	"Best Kept Secret in Santa Fe"	M. Leiken, G. Sklerov	3:00
5.	"He Worshipped Me"	Glenn Sutton	2:39

Side two
No.	Title	Writer(s)	Length
1.	"He Turns It into Love Again"	Glenn Sutton, M. Kellum, L. Cheshier	2:27
2.	"I'm Not Lisa"	Jessi Colter	3:03
3.	"Love Has No Pride"	Eric Kaz, Libby Titus	4:08
4.	"We Got It All Together Now"	Glenn Sutton	2:13
5.	"Life's No Bed of Roses"	Lynn Anderson	2:06
6.	"Good Ole Country Song"	Glenn Sutton	2:13
