= Flattery Will Get You Everywhere =

Single by Lynn Anderson

from the album With Love, from Lynn
- B-side: "A Million Shades of Blue"
- Released: October 1968
- Recorded: 1968
- Studio: RCA Victor (Nashville, Tennessee)
- Genre: Country; Nashville Sound
- Length: 2:40
- Label: Chart
- Songwriter(s): Liz Anderson
- Producer(s): Slim Williamson

Lynn Anderson singles chronology
"Big Girls Don't Cry" (1968)	"Flattery Will Get You Everywhere" (1968)	"Our House Is Not a Home (For It's Never Been Loved In)" (1969)

"Flattery Will You Get You Everywhere" is a song written by Liz Anderson that was recorded by American country music artist Lynn Anderson. It was released as a single in October 1968 via Chart Records.

== Background and release ==
"Flattery Will Get You Everywhere" was recorded at the RCA Victor Studio in 1968, located in Nashville, Tennessee. The sessions was produced by Slim Williamson, Anderson's producer while recording for the Chart label.

"Flattery Will Get You Everywhere" reached number 11 on the Billboard Hot Country Singles chart in 1969. It was Anderson's fifth major hit single as a recording artist. It also charted on the Canadian RPM Country Songs chart, only reaching number 27 in 1969. The song was issued on Anderson's 1969 studio album, With Love, from Lynn.

== Track listings ==
7" vinyl single

- "Flattery Will Get You Everywhere" – 2:40
- "A Million Shades of Blue" – 2:15

== Chart performance ==
Chart (1968–1969)	Peak position
Canada Country Songs (RPM)	27
US Hot Country Songs (Billboard)	11
