= Top of the World (Lynn Anderson album) =

Studio album by Lynn Anderson
- Released: June 1973
- Recorded: 1973
- Genre: Countrypolitan
- Label: Columbia
- Producer: Glenn Sutton

Lynn Anderson chronology
Keep Me In Mind (1973)	Top of the World (1973)	Flower of Love (1973)

Singles from Top of the World
- 1. "Top of the World" Released: June 1973; 2. "Sing About Love" Released: August 1973

Professional ratings
Review scores
Source	Rating
Allmusic	2/5 stars

Top of the World is a studio album released through Columbia Records by country singer Lynn Anderson in 1973. The album was produced by Anderson's husband Glenn Sutton.

This was a very successful album for Lynn Anderson. It reached No. 7 on the "Top Country Albums" chart and No. 179 on the Billboard 200 albums chart. The album was named for her big 1973 hit, "Top of the World". Anderson had heard "Top of the World" when it was released on The Carpenters' 1972 studio album A Song for You and chose to record it herself. Richard Carpenter has stated of the cover, "Karen and I were still debating whether or not to release our version as a single when Lynn Anderson released her own cover of the song. It was a carbon copy and sealed our choice to release the song ourselves." Anderson's version was a No. 2 country hit and a No. 74 pop hit. It has often been speculated that "Top of the World" would have been as big a pop hit for Lynn Anderson as her signature tune, "Rose Garden", had the Carpenters not released their pop version.

This album produced a second single, "Sing About Love", which reached No. 3 on the U.S. country charts. The album was heavy on cover recordings of other acts' hits; besides Anderson's two second release, the only non-cover on the album was a song "Fickle Fortune" written by her mother, Liz Anderson. Besides The Carpenters track, Anderson covered recent releases by Anne Murray, Roberta Flack, Brenda Lee, Vicki Lawrence, Joe Stampley, Tammy Wynette, Johnny Cash, and Bob Luman. The album was Anderson's final release in the dying reel to reel tape format, a format that had been disappearing from stores for several years and hard to find outside of Columbia House.

== Track listing ==
1. "Top of the World" (John Bettis, Richard Carpenter)
2. "Danny's Song" (Kenny Loggins)
3. "Nobody Wins" (Kris Kristofferson)
4. "The Night the Lights Went Out in Georgia" (Bobby Russell)
5. "I'm Still Loving You" (Richey, Glenn Sutton)
6. "Kids Say the Darndest Things" (Billy Sherrill, Glenn Sutton)
7. "Sing About Love" (Glenn Sutton)
8. "Killing Me Softly With His Song" (Charles Fox, Norman Gimbel)
9. "A Thing Called Love" (Jerry Reed)
10. "Fickle Fortune" (Liz Anderson)
11. "Lonely Women Make Good Lovers" (Spooner Oldham, Freddy Weller)

== Chart performance ==
Chart 1973	Peak position
Billboard 200	179
Billboard Top Country Albums	7
