= No Love at All (song) =

1970 single by Lynn Anderson

Single by Lynn Anderson

from the album No Love at All
- B-side: "I Found You Just in Time"
- Released: June 1970
- Recorded: April 1970
- Studio: Columbia (Nashville, Tennessee)
- Genre: Country; Nashville Sound
- Length: 2:48
- Label: Columbia
- Songwriters: Johnny Christopher; Wayne C. Thompson
- Producer: Glenn Sutton

Lynn Anderson singles chronology
"Rocky Top" (1970)	"No Love at All" (1970)	"I'm Alright" (1970)

"No Love at All"

Single by B.J. Thomas

from the album Most of All
- B-side: "Have a Heart"
- Released: February 1971
- Genre: Pop, Easy Listening
- Label: Scepter
- Songwriters: Johnny Christopher; Wayne C. Thompson
- Producers: Buddy Buie, Steve Tyrell

B.J. Thomas singles chronology
"Most of All" (1970)	"No Love at All" (1971)	"Mighty Clouds of Joy" (1971)

"No Love at All" is a song written by Johnny Christopher and Wayne C. Thompson. It was recorded by American country music artist Lynn Anderson and released as a single in June 1970 via Columbia Records.

== Background and release ==
"No Love at All" was recorded at the Columbia Studios in April 1970, located in Nashville, Tennessee. The sessions was produced by Glenn Sutton, Anderson's longtime producer at the Columbia label as well as first husband.

"No Love at All" reached number 15 on the Billboard Hot Country Singles chart in 1970. It was Anderson's eleventh major hit single as a recording artist. It also became a minor hit on the Canadian RPM Country Songs chart, reaching number 42 in 1970. The song was issued on Anderson's 1970 studio album, No Love at All.

== Track listings ==
7" vinyl single

- "No Love at All" – 2:48
- "I Found You Just in Time" – 2:03

== Cover versions ==
- B. J. Thomas covered "No Love at All" in 1970. His version became a pop hit in the United States and Canada, reaching number 16 in both countries. The song did better on the Easy Listening charts, reaching number 4 in the U.S.
- Bobbi Martin also covered the song in 1971, reaching number 123 on the U.S. Billboard chart.

== Chart performance ==
Lynn Anderson

Chart (1970)	Peak position
Canada Country Songs (RPM)	42
US Hot Country Songs (Billboard)	15

B.J. Thomas

Chart (1971)	Peak position
Canada RPM Adult Contemporary	12
Canada RPM Top Singles	16
US Billboard Hot 100	16
US Billboard Easy Listening	4
US Cash Box Top 100	14

Bobbi Martin

Chart (1971)	Peak position
US Billboard Bubbling Under the Hot 100	123
