= I've Never Loved Anyone More (song) =

Single by Lynn Anderson

from the album I've Never Loved Anyone More
- B-side: "He Worshiped Me"
- Released: June 1975
- Studio: Columbia Studio
- Genre: Country; Countrypolitan
- Length: 2:42
- Label: Columbia
- Songwriters: Linda Hargrove; Michael Nesmith
- Producer: Glenn Sutton

Lynn Anderson singles chronology
"He Turns It into Love Again" (1975)	"I've Never Loved Anyone More" (1975)	"Paradise" (1975)

"I've Never Loved Anyone More" is a song written by Linda Hargrove and Michael Nesmith. It was recorded by American country music artist Lynn Anderson and released as a single in June 1975 via Columbia Records.

== Background and release ==
"I've Never Loved Anyone More" was recorded at the Columbia Studio, located in Nashville, Tennessee. The sessions was produced by Glenn Sutton, Anderson's longtime production collaborator at the label and her first husband.

"I've Never Loved Anyone More" reached number 14 on the Billboard Hot Country Singles chart in 1975. It became an even bigger hit on the Canadian RPM Country Songs chart, reaching number 4 the same year. The song was issued on Anderson's 1975 studio album, I've Never Loved Anyone More.

== Track listings ==
7" vinyl single

- "I've Never Loved Anymore More" – 2:42
- "He Worshiped Me" – 2:39

== Chart performance ==
Chart (1973)	Peak position
Canada Country Songs (RPM)	4
US Hot Country Songs (Billboard)	14
