= Talkin' to the Wall =

Single by Warner Mack

from the album The Country Touch
- B-side: "One Mile More"
- Released: February 1966
- Genre: Country
- Length: 2:32
- Label: Columbia
- Songwriter(s): Warner McPherson; Bill Montague
- Producer(s): Owen Bradley

Warner Mack singles chronology
"Sittin' on a Rock (Cryin' in a Creek)" (1965)	"Talkin' to the Wall" (1966)	"It Takes a Lot of Money" (1966)

"Talkin' to the Wall"

Single by Lynn Anderson

from the album Smile for Me
- B-side: "I Want to Be a Part of You"
- Released: June 1974
- Recorded: December 1973
- Genre: Country
- Length: 2:37
- Label: Columbia
- Songwriter(s): Warner McPherson; Bill Montague
- Producer(s): Glenn Sutton

Lynn Anderson singles chronology
"Smile for Me" (1974)	"Talkin' to the Wall" (1974)	"What a Man My Man Is" (1974)

"Talkin' to the Wall" is a single originally recorded by country singer Warner MacPherson (better known by his stage name Warner Mack). He co-wrote it with Bill Montague. It became a top ten hit for him when the song peaked at No. 3 in the Country Singles chart in 1966. In March of that same year, Loretta Lynn recorded the song, which was included on her album, You Ain't Woman Enough.

The song was covered by American country music artist Lynn Anderson. Released in June 1974, it was the second single from her album Smile for Me. The song peaked at number 7 on the Billboard Hot Country Singles chart. It also reached number 1 on the RPM Country Tracks chart in Canada.

== Chart performance ==
=== Warner Mack ===
Chart (1966)	Peak position
U.S. Billboard Hot Country Singles	3

=== Lynn Anderson ===
Chart (1974)	Peak position
U.S. Billboard Hot Country Singles	7
Canadian RPM Country Tracks	1
