= Sing About Love =

Single by Lynn Anderson

from the album Top of the World
- B-side: "Fickle Fortune"
- Released: 1973
- Recorded: 1973
- Studio: Columbia Studio
- Genre: Country; Countrypolitan
- Length: 2:19
- Label: Columbia
- Songwriter: Glenn Sutton
- Producer: Glenn Sutton

Lynn Anderson singles chronology
"Top of the World" (1973)	"Sing About Love" (1973)	"Smile for Me" (1973)

"Sing About Love" is a song written by Glenn Sutton. It was recorded by American country music artist Lynn Anderson and released as a single in 1973 via Columbia Records.

== Background and release ==
"Sing About Love" was recorded at the Columbia Studio in March 1973, located in Nashville, Tennessee. The sessions was produced by Glenn Sutton, Anderson's longtime production collaborator at the label and her first husband.

"Sing About Love" reached number 3 on the Billboard Hot Country Singles chart in 1973. It became Anderson's fourteenth top ten hit as a recording artist. It also became a top ten hit on the Canadian RPM Country Songs chart, reaching number 3 in 1973. The song was issued on Anderson's 1973 studio album, Top of the World.

== Track listings ==
7" vinyl single

- "Sing About Love" – 2:19
- "Fickle Fortune" – 2:03

== Chart performance ==
Chart (1973)	Peak position
Canada Country Songs (RPM)	3
US Hot Country Songs (Billboard)	3
