= All the King's Horses (Lynn Anderson song) =

Single by Lynn Anderson

from the album All the King's Horses
- B-side: "If All I Have to Do is Just Love You"
- Released: January 1976
- Studio: Columbia Studio
- Genre: Country; Countrypolitan
- Length: 2:45
- Label: Columbia
- Songwriter: Johnny Cunningham
- Producer: Glenn Sutton

Lynn Anderson singles chronology
"Paradise" (1975)	"All the King's Horses" (1976)	"Rodeo Cowboy" (1976)

"All the King's Horses" is a song written by Johnny Cunningham. It was recorded by American country music artist Lynn Anderson and released as a single in January 1976 via Columbia Records.

== Background and release ==
"All the King's Horses" was recorded at the Columbia Studio, located in Nashville, Tennessee. The sessions was produced by Glenn Sutton, Anderson's longtime production collaborator at the label and her first husband.

"All the King's Horses" became a major hit when it reached number 20 on the Billboard Hot Country Singles chart in 1976. It became an even bigger hit on the Canadian RPM Country Songs chart, reaching number five the same year. The song was issued on Anderson's 1976 studio album of the same name.

== Track listings ==
7" vinyl single

- "I've Never Loved Anymore More" – 2:45
- "All I Have to Do Is Just Love You" – 2:07

== Chart performance ==
Chart (1973)	Peak position
Canada Country Songs (RPM)	5
US Hot Country Songs (Billboard)	20
