= Rocky Top =

Felice and Boudleaux Bryant country and bluegrass song

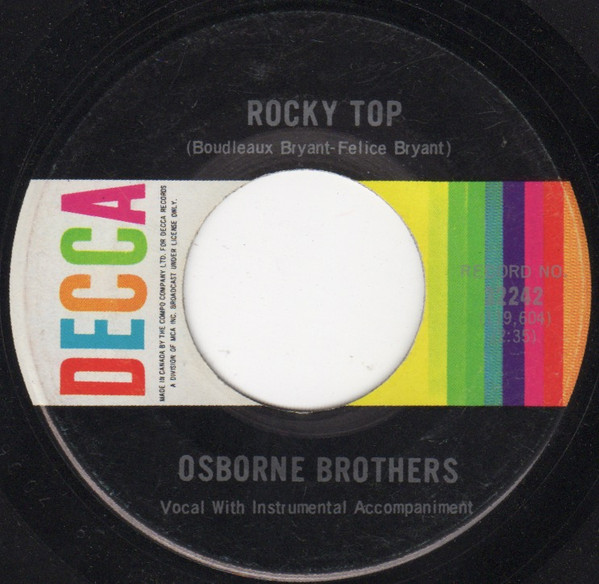
- Canadian single label

Single by Osborne Brothers

from the album Yesterday, Today, and the Osborne Brothers
- B-side: "My Favorite Memory"
- Released: December 25, 1967
- Recorded: November 16, 1967
- Studio: Bradley's Barn, Mount Juliet, Tennessee
- Genre: Bluegrass, country
- Length: 2:35
- Label: Decca
- Songwriter: Felice and Boudleaux Bryant

"Rocky Top"

Single by Lynn Anderson

from the album I'm Alright
- B-side: "Take Me Home"
- Released: April 1970
- Recorded: May 1969
- Studio: RCA Victor (Nashville, Tennessee)
- Genre: Bluegrass
- Length: 2:39
- Label: Chart
- Songwriter: Felice and Boudleaux Bryant
- Producer: Slim Williamson

"Rocky Top" is an American country and bluegrass song written by Felice and Boudleaux Bryant in 1967 and first recorded by the Osborne Brothers later that same year. The song, which is a city dweller's lamentation over the loss of a simpler and freer existence in the hills of Tennessee, is one of Tennessee's sixteen official state songs and has been recorded by dozens of artists from multiple musical genres worldwide since its publication.

In U.S. college athletics, "Rocky Top" is associated with the Tennessee Volunteers of the University of Tennessee (UT), whose Pride of the Southland Band has played a marching band version of the song at the school's sporting events since the early 1970s.

The Osborne Brothers' 1967 bluegrass version of the song reached No. 33 on the U.S. Country charts, and Lynn Anderson's 1970 version peaked at No. 17 on the U.S. Country charts and at No. 33 in Canada. In 2005, The Atlanta Journal-Constitution ranked "Rocky Top" number seven on its list of "100 Songs of the South".

== Background ==
"Rocky Top" was written by married songwriting duo Boudleaux Bryant (1920–1987) and Felice Bryant (1925–2003) in 1967. At the time, the Bryants were working at The Gatlinburg Inn in Gatlinburg, Tennessee on a collection of slow-tempo songs for a project for Archie Campbell and Chet Atkins. Writing the fast-paced "Rocky Top," which took 15 minutes, served as a temporary diversion for them.

While the song became a staple of the Osborne Brothers concerts in the late 1960s, the song did not achieve mass popularity until the early 1970s, when Lynn Anderson's version reached number seventeen on the Billboard Country Top 100. In 1972, the University of Tennessee's Pride of the Southland Band first played the song as part of one of its drills, the idea and arrangement being primarily the work of band arranger Barry MacDonald. The song was deemed popular enough to be played at a halftime country music show by guest saxophone soloist Boots Randolph at a game in Knoxville against Alabama on October 21, 1972, gaining fans' attention. Randolph reprised his jazzy "Rocky Top" solo when Tennessee played LSU on New Year's Eve, 1972 in the Astro-Bluebonnet Bowl at the Houston Astrodome. The University of Tennessee recognized the song's appeal and the band started playing Rocky Top at every game. Long-term band director W.J. Julian stated that if Rocky Top was ever not played, then there would be a mutiny among Vol fans, reflecting the song's deep-rooted foundation in UT sports.

The song was officially adopted as the fifth Tennessee state song in 1982, passing in the Tennessee House of Representatives in a unanimous 97–0 vote and in the Tennessee Senate with a 30–1 vote. In the 1970s, the song achieved such popularity among bar crowds that the Chapel Hill, North Carolina–based old-time band the Red Clay Ramblers' national tours included a crowd-pleasing satire informally titled "Play 'Rocky Top' (or I'll Punch Your Lights Out.)" The Bryants' children currently own the rights to the song under the corporate name "House of Bryant."

== Lyrics ==
Despite its fast and upbeat tempo, the song laments the loss of a way of life. In the song's opening verse, the singer longs for a place called "Rocky Top," where there is no "smoggy smoke" and there are no "telephone bills." The singer reminisces about a love affair he once had on Rocky Top with a woman "wild as a mink" and "sweet as soda pop." The song's second verse recalls a story about two "strangers" (apparently revenue agents) climbing Rocky Top "looking for a moonshine still," but never returning (conflict between moonshiners and "revenuers" is a common theme in Appalachian culture). The song says that the soil on Rocky Top is too rocky to grow corn, so the people of Rocky Top "get their corn from a jar". In the third and final verse (which consists of just four lines), the singer again longs for the "simple" life, likening life in the city to being "trapped like a duck in a pen."

== College fight song ==
"Rocky Top" is a favorite of Tennessee fans, alumni, and others who sing it while the Tennessee Volunteers play at Neyland Stadium and Thompson–Boling Arena. The House of Bryant in Gatlinburg, their publishing company, has granted the University of Tennessee a perpetual license to play the song as much and as often as success on the field dictates. The song was first played on October 21, 1972, during a home game against the Alabama Crimson Tide, where the Volunteers lost 17–10. According to the Knoxville News Sentinel, the band director at the time, Dr. W. J. Julian, was reluctant to play "Rocky Top" as Julian did not think it was appropriate for the game's halftime show. However, the assistant band director, Barry MacDonald, insisted on playing the song, and Julian eventually gave in and let the band play "Rocky Top" for 50 seconds at the end of a circle drill during their halftime show.

Over the years, "Rocky Top" has become so closely associated with the University of Tennessee that many people believe it to be the school's fight song. However, UT's official fight song is "Down the Field". Regardless of its lack of official status, in 2015, "Rocky Top" was designated the #1 fight song in college football, based on a "cumulative data-based ranking of America's most engaged fan bases" by USA Today. One Tennessee tradition related to the song and similar to that of other schools is to have the team's quarterback conduct the marching band in performing the song after a big win, with Peyton Manning popularizing the tradition when he was Tennessee quarterback.

== Location of Rocky Top ==
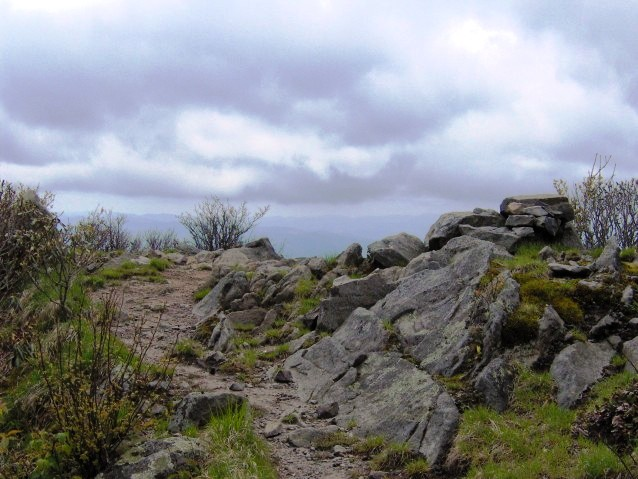
Rocky Top and the Appalachian Trail

While the Bryants never indicated that "Rocky Top, Tennessee" refers to a specific place, some have suggested that a 5,440-foot (1,660 m) barren summit known as "Rocky Top"— located in the Great Smoky Mountains along the Tennessee–North Carolina border— is the best fit, due in large part to its proximity to Gatlinburg, where the song was written.

Rocky Top is a subpeak of Thunderhead Mountain, which overlooks Cades Cove, and is traversed by the Appalachian Trail. Rocky Top appears on maps of the western Smokies as early as 1934, and has been a popular hiking destination since the Great Smoky Mountains National Park was created during the same period. The rocky outcropping at the peak is about 25 yards (23 m) long and is located on the North Carolina side of the state border.

In 2014, Rocky Top became an official place name after Lake City, Tennessee, changed its name to Rocky Top after an effort by the Bryant family's publishing firm to enjoin the city was denied by a federal court.

== Notable covers ==
Phish played "Rocky Top" regularly from 1987 to 2003 and, after reforming, again in 2009. There have been additional cover versions of the song by artists such as The Schwag, Dillard and Clark and country artists such as Buck Owens, Lynn Anderson, Dolly Parton, John Denver, Albert Lee, Conway Twitty, Billie Jo Spears, Dottie West, Kitty Wells and John Stewart. Columbus, Ohio–based all-female rock trio Scrawl, included a cover of the song on their Nashville-recorded 1988 album "He's Drunk". Many contemporary groups and artists have performed the song while performing in Knoxville, including Rascal Flatts, Brad Paisley, Keith Urban, and Dierks Bentley. The country rock group the Nitty Gritty Dirt Band tackled the song on their 1976 compilation album Dirt, Silver and Gold. The 2011 pilot episode of NBC's sitcom Up All Night featured Christina Applegate and Will Arnett singing "Rocky Top." The song is also frequently played in multiple parks at Walt Disney World, including the Magic Kingdom, and by the Liberty Singers at Epcot.

== See also ==
- Good Old Mountain Dew
