= No Love at All (album) =

Studio album by Lynn Anderson
- Released: August 1970
- Recorded: April 1970
- Studio: Columbia (Nashville, Tennessee)
- Genre: Country; Countrypolitan
- Label: Columbia
- Producer: Glenn Sutton

Lynn Anderson chronology
Songs My Mother Wrote (Lynn Anderson Sings Liz Anderson) (1970)	No Love at All (1970)	I'm Alright (1970)

Singles from No Love at All
- 1. "No Love at All" Released: June 1970

No Love at All is a studio album by American country artist Lynn Anderson. It was released in August 1970 on Columbia Records and was produced by Glenn Sutton. No Love at All was Anderson's ninth studio recording as a music artist and the second released on the Columbia label. The album's only single, the title track, became a major hit on the Billboard country chart. The album itself also reached peak positions on a similar survey.

== Background and content ==
No Love at All was recorded at the Columbia Recording Studios in Nashville, Tennessee. The sessions took place in April 1970 and were produced by Glenn Sutton. Anderson had recently married Sutton and he began producing her music following her signing with Columbia Records in 1970. The album was a collection of 11 tracks. It included two compositions written by her mother, Liz Anderson. One of these compositions, "All Day Sucker," had been a minor hit for her mother in 1970. The album also included cover versions of songs first recorded by other artists. This included Conway Twitty's "Hello Darlin'," Ferlin Husky's "Heavenly Sunshine," Wanda Jackson's "A Woman Lives for Love" and Ernest Tubb's "Tomorrow Never Comes."

== Release and reception ==
Professional ratings
Review scores
Source	Rating
Allmusic	4/5 stars

No Love at All was released in August 1970 on Columbia Records. It was Anderson's ninth studio album overall and her second issued on the Columbia label after signing with the company in 1970. The album was issued as a vinyl LP, containing six songs on "side one" and five songs on "side two." After spending 11 weeks on the Billboard Top Country Albums chart, the record peaked at number 22 in October 1970.

No Love at All was reviewed positively by Pemberton Roach of Allmusic, who gave the project four out of five stars. He called the album "a lost gem of early 1970's Countrypolitan," and highlighted several tracks on the album. "No Love at All reminds the listener that she is a formidable talent whose work deserves to be re-examined," he concluded. The title track was the only single released from the album. It was issued in June 1970. The song spent a total of 15 weeks on the Billboard Hot Country Singles before reaching number 15 in September 1970, becoming a major hit. In Canada, the single reached a minor position, peaking at number 42 on the RPM Country Songs chart.

== Track listing ==
Side one
No.	Title	Writer(s)	Length
1.	"The Time's Just Right"	Jerry Foster; Bill Rice	2:15
2.	"A Woman Lives for Love"	Billy Sherrill; Glenn Sutton; Norro Wilson	2:32
3.	"Husband Hunting"	Liz Anderson	2:20
4.	"Hello Darlin'"	Conway Twitty	2:37
5.	"Heavenly Sunshine"	George Richey; Sutton	2:28
6.	"It's My Time"	John D. Loudermilk	2:15

Side two
No.	Title	Writer(s)	Length
1.	"No Love at All"	Johnny Christopher; Wayne C. Thompson	2:48
2.	"Tomorrow Never Comes"	Johnny Bond; Ernest Tubb	2:53
3.	"All Day Sucker"	Casey Anderson; L. Anderson	2:19
4.	"I Found You Just in Time"	Sherrill; Sutton	2:03
5.	"Alabam"	Lloyd Copas	2:00

== Personnel ==
All credits are adapted from the liner notes of No Love at All.

Musical and technical personnel

- Lynn Anderson – lead vocals
- Charlie Bragg – engineering
- Lou Bradley – engineering
- Mort Goode – liner notes
- Glenn Sutton – producer

== Chart performance ==
Chart (1970)	Peak position
US Top Country Albums (Billboard)	22

== Release history ==
Region	Date	Format	Label	Ref.
Canada	August 1970	Cassette	Columbia Records	
United States	August 1970	Vinyl	Columbia Records	
