= He Turns It into Love Again =

Single by Lynn Anderson

from the album I've Never Loved Anyone More
- B-side: "Someone to Finish What You Started"
- Released: February 1975
- Studio: Columbia Studio
- Genre: Country; Countrypolitan
- Length: 2:27
- Label: Columbia
- Songwriters: Jerry Cheshier; Murry Kellum; Glenn Sutton
- Producer: Glenn Sutton

Lynn Anderson singles chronology
"What a Man My Man Is" (1974)	"He Turns It into Love Again" (1975)	"I've Never Loved Anyone More" (1975)

"He Turns It into Love Again" is a song written by Jerry Cheshier, Murry Kellum and Glenn Sutton. It was recorded by American country music artist Lynn Anderson and released as a single in February 1975 via Columbia Records.

== Background and release ==
"He Turns It into Love Again" was recorded at the Columbia Studio, located in Nashville, Tennessee. The sessions was produced by Glenn Sutton, Anderson's longtime production collaborator at the label and her first husband.

"He Turns It into Love Again" reached number 13 on the Billboard Hot Country Singles chart in 1975. It became a minor hit on the Canadian RPM Country Songs chart, reaching number 28 in 1975. The song was issued on Anderson's 1975 studio album, I've Never Loved Anyone More.

== Track listings ==
7" vinyl single

- "He Turns It into Love Again" – 2:27
- "Someone to Finish What You Started" – 3:12

== Chart performance ==
Chart (1974)	Peak position
Canada Adult Contemporary Songs (RPM)	37
Canada Country Songs (RPM)	28
US Hot Country Songs (Billboard)	13
