= What a Man My Man Is (album) =

Studio album by Lynn Anderson
- Released: 1974
- Recorded: 1974
- Genre: Country pop
- Label: Columbia
- Producer: Glenn Sutton

Lynn Anderson chronology
Smile for Me (1974)	What a Man My Man Is (1974)	I've Never Loved Anyone More (1975)

Professional ratings
Review scores
Source	Rating
Allmusic	2/5 stars

What a Man My Man Is is a studio album by country singer Lynn Anderson, released in late 1974.

The album's title song, "What a Man My Man Is", was very successful, hitting No. 1 on the country charts in the last week of 1974. The song would be her last No. 1 hit and last entry on the pop music Hot 100 chart. It was the only single from the album.

The cover shows Anderson in a cowgirl hat and, in the background, another photo of Anderson holding her hat, walking on a hill. This album consisted of 11 tracks, some of which were new songs and some of which were cover versions. Covers include Olivia Newton-John's "I Honestly Love You," Sami Jo's "Tell Me a Lie," and Kris Kristofferson's "Please Don't Tell Me How the Story Ends." Anderson's mother, Liz Anderson, wrote one song for this album, "I Feel Like a New Man Today." Anderson's husband at the time, Glenn Sutton, produced this album and wrote or co-wrote four of its tracks, including the title track.

This album reached No. 18 on the "Top Country Albums" chart, but failed to make an appearance on the Billboard 200 album chart, unlike her previous albums.

== Track listing ==
1. "What a Man My Man Is" (Glenn Sutton)
2. "I Honestly Love You" (Peter Allen, Jeff Barry)
3. "Everything's Falling In Place (For Me and You)" (Murry Kellum, Larry Cheshire)
4. "Tell Me a Lie" (Barbara Wyrick, Charles Buckins)
5. "Someone to Finish What You Started" (Glenn Sutton, Arthur Leo Owens)
6. "Everybody's Somebody's Fool" (Howard Greenfield, Jack Keller)
7. "I Won't Go Back to Denver" (Glenn Sutton, Arthur Leo Owens)
8. "Please Don't Tell Me How the Story Ends" (Kris Kristofferson)
9. "Walk Me to the Door" (Conway Twitty)
10. "Where Is All That Love You Talked About" (Glenn Sutton, Gene Vowel, Arthur Leo Owens)
11. "I Feel Like a New Man Today" (Liz Anderson)
