= Smile for Me (album) =

Studio album by Lynn Anderson
- Released: 1974
- Recorded: 1974
- Genre: Countrypolitan
- Label: Columbia
- Producer: Glenn Sutton

Lynn Anderson chronology
It Makes You Happy (1974)	Smile for Me (1974)	What a Man My Man Is (1974)

Professional ratings
Review scores
Source	Rating
Allmusic	2/5 stars

Smile for Me is a 1974 studio album by country music singer Lynn Anderson.

One of two albums released by Lynn Anderson in 1974, the album consisted of 11 tracks and was named for the single "Smile for Me", the first of two singles released from this album along with "Takin' to the Wall". The title track was the first to be released in 1974. The song reached No. 15 on the Billboard Country charts, ending Anderson's string of nine consecutive top ten hits. Talkin' to the Wall", which was originally a country hit for Warner Mack in the mid-1960s, returned her to the top ten, climbing to No. 7 on the country charts. The album peaked at No. 14 on Billboard's "Top Country Albums" chart in 1974, breaking Anderson's string of seven consecutive top ten albums.

== Track listing ==
1. "Smile for Me" (Rory Bourke)– 2:48
2. "Let Me Be There" (John Rostill) – 2:59
3. "Tomorrow" (Liz Anderson) – 2:57
4. "I'm Not That Good At Goodbyes" (Don Williams, Bob McDill) – 2:51
5. "Born in Love" (Carl Thomason)– 2:24
6. "It Must Be Love This Time" (Jim Weatherly) – 2:48
7. "Love of My Life" (Kenny O'Dell) – 2:40
8. "A Man Like Your Daddy" (Glenn Sutton) – 2:14
9. "I Want to Be a Part of You" (Glenn Sutton) – 2:12
10. "Drifting Apart" (Hal Gurnee) – 2:27
11. "Talkin' to the Wall" (Wayne McPherson)– 2:37
