= Linda Hargrove =

American singer-songwriter

- Also known as: Linda Bartholomew
- Born: February 3, 1949; Tallahassee, Florida, U.S.
- Died: October 24, 2010 (aged 61) Tallahassee, Florida
- Genres: Country
- Occupation: Singer-songwriter
- Instrument: Piano
- Years active: 1973–2005
- Labels: Elektra, Capitol, RCA

Linda Hargrove (married name Bartholomew, born Tallahassee, Florida, February 3, 1949 – October 24, 2010, Tallahassee, Florida) was an American rock/country songwriter and musician. She had her first success in songwriting when she was 17 and co-wrote two songs with a friend. A Tallahassee band, the Other Side, decided to record the songs and they were hits on her hometown's local radio station. In 1969, Linda's brother, Lee Hargrove, was working with another local band, After All (see 1969 in music) that used poems that Linda wrote set to the band's music. The band went to Nashville to record an album and Hargrove went with them. Soon after, she made the decision to move to Nashville. She wrote many country music hits for a variety of artists and had a respectable career for herself in the mid-1970s. She was known as "The Blue Jean Country Queen" because she usually performed in jeans and without the elaborate makeup that other female country performers of the time wore. After marrying and undergoing a religious conversion, she made two gospel albums in the 1980s. She put out her final album in 2005 and died in 2010.

== Songs ==
- "Just Get Up and Close the Door" – Johnny Rodriguez took this to No. 1 in 1975
- "Let It Shine" – the 1975 recording by Olivia Newton-John went to No. 1 on the Easy Listening chart and No. 5 on the Country chart.
- "I've Never Loved Anyone More" (with Michael Nesmith) was the title song of a 1975 Lynn Anderson album and reached No. 14 on the Country chart.
- "Winonah" (with Michael Nesmith).
- "We've Gone as Far as We Can Go" - recorded by Asleep at the Wheel on their 1976 album "Wheelin' and Dealin'".
- "Love Was (Once Around the Dance Floor)" (1978) was Hargrove's only top 40 hit as a performer
- "Tennessee Whiskey" (with Dean Dillon) – recorded by David Allan Coe (No. 77 in 1981), George Jones (No. 2 in 1983), Meghan Linsey (No. 28 in 2015), and Chris Stapleton (No. 1 in 2015)
- ”Blue Satin", "Intangible She", "Nothing Left To Do", "And I Will Follow", "Let It Fly", "A Face That Doesn't Matter", and "Waiting" recorded by After All on the 1969 self-titled album.
- "I'm Not Hurt" (co-written with C. Miller) and "Don't You Stray" (co-written with C. Miller) recorded by The Other Side in 1967.
- "The Highway Song" and "Tokyo Rose" (co-written with Pete Drake) on Bluefield’s 1975 self-titled album.
- "New York City Song", "You Just Loved the Leavin' Out of Me", and "What If We Were Runnin' Out of Love", were recorded by Tanya Tucker

== Discography ==
=== Albums ===
Year	Album	US Country	Label
1973	Music Is Your Mistress	—	Elektra
1974	Blue Jean Country Queen	—	Elektra
1975	Love, You're the Teacher	45	Capitol
1976	Just Like You	—	Capitol
1977	Impressions	—	Capitol
1978	Linda Hargrove S/T	—	Zeus
1981	A New Song (as Linda Bartholomew)	—	Fig Tree
1987	Greater Works (as Linda Bartholomew)	—	Three Fold
2005	One Woman's Life	—	Panacea

=== Singles ===
Year	Single	Chart Positions		Album
Year	Single	US Country	CAN Country	Album
1974	"Blue Jean Country Queen"	98	—	Blue Jean Country Queen
1974	"I've Never Loved Anyone More"	82	—	Blue Jean Country Queen
1975	"Love Was (Once Around the Dance Floor)"	39	32	Love, You're the Teacher
1975	“Half My Heart’s in Texas”	—	—	Love, You're the Teacher
1976	"20/20 Hindsight"	86	—	
1976	"Fire at First Sight"	86	—	Just Like You
1977	"Down to My Pride"	91	—	Impressions
1977	"Mexican Love Songs"	61	—	Impressions
1978	"You Are Still the One"	93	—	Single only
1978	“I Forgave (But I Forget To Forgive)	—	—	Single only
1978	“Carnival of Love”	—	—	Single only
1978	“You’re the Only One of You I’ve Got”	—	—	Single only
