= What a Man My Man Is (song) =

Single by Lynn Anderson

from the album What a Man My Man Is
- B-side: "Everything's Falling in Place (For Me and You)"
- Released: October 1974
- Recorded: 1974
- Genre: Countrypolitan
- Length: 2:15
- Label: Columbia
- Songwriter(s): Glenn Sutton
- Producer(s): Glenn Sutton, Clive Davis

Lynn Anderson singles chronology
"Talkin' to the Wall" (1974)	"What a Man My Man Is" (1974)	"He Turns It into Love Again" (1975)

"What a Man My Man Is" is the name of a No. 1 U.S. country music hit by Lynn Anderson, from 1974.

This was Anderson's last No. 1 country hit, staying at the top for one week and spending a total of nine weeks on the chart. It was also her last pop entry on the Hot 100, reaching number 93. For the next few years, Anderson would place hits in the Country top 15 and 20, but wouldn't reach the top 10 again until 1979 with "Isn't it Always Love". The song has been re-recorded numerous times by Anderson, including on her Grammy-nominated 2004 album, The Bluegrass Sessions.

== Chart performance ==
Chart (1974)	Peak position
U.S. Billboard Hot 100	93
U.S. Billboard Hot Country Singles	1
Canadian RPM Country Tracks	1
