= If I Kiss You (Will You Go Away) =

Single by Lynn Anderson

from the album Ride, Ride, Ride
- B-side: "Then Go"
- Released: 1967
- Genre: Country
- Length: 2:13
- Label: Chart
- Songwriter: Liz Anderson

Lynn Anderson singles chronology
"Ride, Ride, Ride" (1966)	"If I Kiss You (Will You Go Away)" (1967)	"Too Much of You" (1967)

"If I Kiss You (Will You Go Away)" is a popular 1967 song by the country singer Lynn Anderson.

== Summary ==
"If I Kiss You" was Anderson's first top-ten single, paving the way for a further eight number ones and 18 top tens. Anderson's first single, "Ride, Ride, Ride", also released in 1967, made the Country Top 40. "If I Kiss You (Will You Go Away)" reached the Top 5 on the Country chart. It was written by her mother, the legendary country music singer-songwriter, Liz Anderson.

Lynn Anderson performed "If I Kiss You", with Kimmosato, on the Lawrence Welk Show where she was a regular during the 1967 - 1968 season. "If I Kiss You" was followed by other quirky country songs that became hits, like "That's a No No", "Big Girls Don't Cry", (not to be confused with the song "Big Girls Don't Cry" by Frankie Valli and the Four Seasons) and "Flattery Will Get You Everywhere", all hits for her in the late 1960s.

== Chart performance ==
Chart (1967)	Peak position
U.S. Billboard Hot Country Singles	5
