= Smile for Me (Lynn Anderson song) =

Single by Lynn Anderson

from the album Smile for Me
- B-side: "A Man Like Your Daddy"
- Released: February 1974
- Recorded: December 1973
- Studio: Columbia Studio
- Genre: Country; Countrypolitan
- Length: 2:47
- Label: Columbia
- Songwriter: Rory Bourke
- Producer: Glenn Sutton

Lynn Anderson singles chronology
"Sing About Love" (1973)	"Smile for Me" (1974)	"Talkin' to the Wall" (1974)

"Smile for Me" is a song written by Rory Bourke. It was recorded by American country music artist Lynn Anderson and released as a single in February 1974 via Columbia Records.

== Background and release ==
"Smile for Me" was recorded at the Columbia Studio in December 1973, located in Nashville, Tennessee. The sessions was produced by Glenn Sutton, Anderson's longtime production collaborator at the label and her first husband.

"Smile for Me" reached number 15 on the Billboard Hot Country Singles chart in 1973. It became a top ten hit on the Canadian RPM Country Songs chart, reaching number ten in 1974. The song was issued on Anderson's 1974 studio album, Smile for Me.

== Track listings ==
7" vinyl single

- "Smile for Me" – 2:47
- "A Man Like Your Daddy" – 2:14

== Chart performance ==
Chart (1974)	Peak position
Canada Country Songs (RPM)	10
US Hot Country Songs (Billboard)	15

== Cover versions ==
Olivia Newton-John covered "Smile for Me" in 1976. It was included as a track on her Come On Over LP.
