= No Another Time =

Single by Lynn Anderson

from the album Promises, Promises
- B-side: "The Worst Is Yet to Come"
- Released: 1968
- Genre: Country
- Length: 2:00
- Label: Chart
- Songwriters: Jerry Lane; Slim Williamson
- Producers: Slim Williamson & Lloyd Green

Lynn Anderson singles chronology
"Promises, Promises" (1967)	"No Another Time" (1968)	"Big Girls Don't Cry" (1968)

"No Another Time" is a song recorded by Lynn Anderson, which she released in 1968 as a single and on her album Promises, Promises. It spent 14 weeks on Billboard's Hot Country Singles chart, reaching No. 8, while reaching No. 7 on Record World's Top C&W Singles chart, No. 12 on the Cash Box Country Top 50, and No. 19 on Canada's RPM Country Chart.

== Chart performance ==
Chart (1968)	Peak position
Canada - RPM Country Chart	19
US Billboard Hot Country Singles	8
US Cash Box Country Top 50	12
US Record World Top Country Singles	7
