= Rose Garden (album) =

Studio album by Lynn Anderson
- Released: 1970
- Studio: Columbia (Nashville, Tennessee)
- Genre: Country, pop
- Label: Columbia
- Producer: Glenn Sutton

Lynn Anderson chronology
I'm Alright (1970)	Rose Garden (1970)	Lynn Anderson's Greatest Hits, Vol. 1 (1971)

Rose Garden is a multi-million selling, RIAA Platinum-certified studio album by country singer Lynn Anderson. Recorded at the Columbia Recording Studio in Nashville, Tennessee, it was released in late 1970 as the title song was climbing country and pop music charts around the world. The single went on to top the Country charts, where it stayed at the number 1 position for five weeks. It reached number 3 on the Billboard Hot 100 pop chart in early 1971 and hit number 1 in both Cash Box and Record World. It was an international top five pop hit in numerous countries. Anderson received a Grammy Award for Best Female Country Vocal Performance for the record. It would remain the biggest selling album by a female country artist for 27 years (1970-1997).

The album went platinum in the United States, arguably the first female country artist release to do so (Tammy Wynette's Greatest Hits from 1969 also went platinum but given that the RIAA did not officially have "platinum" records until 1976 there was no way to tell which album reached the sales mark first; Columbia/Epic gave Anderson and Wynette each platinum record trophies in late 1972.) The album Rose Garden continued to sell well for over a decade and later managed to receive an official platinum record as well for sales post-1976.

The album Rose Garden hit the Billboard country album chart on December 26, 1970 and by the February 13th issue had climbed to number 1 on the chart where it would remain for 14 weeks, the longest run at the top of that chart for any country female vocalist until Shania Twain's The Woman in Me album in 1995, 25 years later. Rose Garden still ranks among the top 50 country albums of alltime in the history of the country album chart. The disc peaked at number 19 on the Billboard 200 albums pop chart, by far Anderson's best showing on that chart. The album was also nominated for "Album of the Year" by the Country Music Association and was in print for over 15 years. Anderson was also nominated for "Record of the Year" for the single of "Rose Garden" and won the Female Vocalist of the Year award at the same ceremonies breaking Tammy Wynette's three-year winning streak.

== Later releases ==
This album, together with the 1972 "Greatest Hits" album, was reissued on the Super Audio CD format in 2018 by UK label Dutton Vocalion, remastered in both Stereo and Surround Sound from the original analogue tapes by Michael J. Dutton and released as a 2-fer with "Greatest Hits". The Surround Sound portion of the disc features the Quadraphonic mixes for both the "Greatest Hits" and "Rose Garden" albums, made available for the first time in over 40 years.

== Track listing ==
1. "(I Never Promised You a) Rose Garden" (Joe South) – 2:53
2. "For the Good Times" (Kris Kristofferson)
3. "Another Lonely Night" (Larry Butler)
4. "I Don't Wanna Play House" (Billy Sherrill, Glenn Sutton)
5. "Snowbird" (Gene MacLellan)
6. "Your Sweet Love Lifted Me" (George Richey, Glenn Sutton)
7. "Sunday Morning Coming Down" (Kris Kristofferson)
8. "I Still Belong to You" (Bill Rice, Jerry Foster)
9. "I Wish I Was a Little Boy Again" (Glenn Sutton, Darrell Edwards)
10. "It's Only Make Believe" (Conway Twitty, Jack Nance)
11. "Nothing Between Us" (Lynn Anderson)

== Charts ==
Chart performance for Rose Garden
Chart (1971)	Peak position
Norwegian Albums (VG-lista)	1
UK Albums (OCC)	45
US Billboard 200	19

== Certifications ==
Region	Certification	Certified units/sales
Canada (Music Canada)	Platinum	100,000^{^}
United States (RIAA)	Platinum	1,000,000^{^}
^{^} Shipments figures based on certification alone.
