= LaWanda Lindsey =

American country music singer

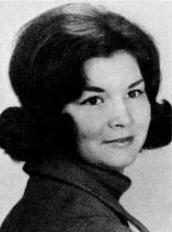
- LaWanda Lindsey in 1968

Background information
- Born: January 12, 1953 (age 72); Tampa, Florida, United States
- Genres: Country
- Occupation: Singer
- Years active: 1968–1978
- Labels: Chart, Capitol

LaWanda Lindsey (born January 12, 1953) is an American country music singer.

Born in Tampa, Florida, United States, she began her career at age 14 and had her first nationally charted record at age 16 with "Partly Bill". She was one of several quite young artists recording country music for Chart Records during this period, and was paired with country singer-songwriter Kenny Vernon, to record a number of duets. She got her start singing on WEAS-AM radio station in Savannah, Georgia, where her father, Norman H. "Lefty" Lindsey, was the general manager and on-air personality. In 1973, she became a protégé of Buck Owens and began recording for Capitol Records, later in 1977-1978 she was on Mercury Records.

From 1969 to 1978, LaWanda Lindsey placed 14 songs on the Billboard country chart, but only two of her songs ("Pickin' Wild Mountain Berries" in 1970 and "Hello Out There" in 1973) placed in the top 30. She nevertheless had a mid-level career in the industry before retiring in 1979.

== Discography ==
=== Albums ===
Year	Album	US Country	Label
1969	Swingin' & Singin' My Song	45	Chart
1970	Pickin' Wild Mounn Berries (with Kenny Vernon)	—	Chart
1970	We'll Sing in the Sunshine	—	Chart
1971	LaWanda Lindsey's Greatest Hits, Volume 1	41	Chart
1974	This Is LaWanda Lindsey	—	Capitol

=== Singles ===
Year	Single	Chart Positions		Album
Year	Single	US Country	CAN Country	Album
1968	"Beggars Can't Be Choosers"	—	—	Swingin' & Singin' My Song
1968	"Wave Bye Bye to the Man"	—	—	Swingin' & Singin' My Song
1968	"What Kind of Woman"	—	—	Swingin' & Singin' My Song
1969	"A Woman's Intuition"	—	—	Swingin' & Singin' My Song
1969	"Strike Three You're Out"	—	—	single only
1969	"Partly Bill"	48	—	We'll Sing in the Sunshine
1970	"We'll Sing in the Sunshine"	63	—	We'll Sing in the Sunshine
1970	"The Day of Our Love"	—	—	We'll Sing in the Sunshine
1971	"The Crawdad Song" (with Kenny Vernon)	42	—	single only
1971	"You Make My Day"	—	—	LaWanda Lindsey's Greatest Hits, Volume 1
1971	"You and Me in Us"	—	—	singles only
1971	"Partin' of the Ways"	—	—	singles only
1972	"Wish I Was a Little Boy Again"	60	—	singles only
1972	"One Time Too Many"	—	—	singles only
1973	"Today Will Be the First Day of the Rest of My Life"	38	63	This Is LaWanda Lindsey
1973	"Sunshine Feeling"	87	78	This Is LaWanda Lindsey
1974	"Hello Trouble"	62	—	This Is LaWanda Lindsey
1974	"Hello Out There"	28	—	This Is LaWanda Lindsey
1974	"I Ain't Hangin' 'Round"	67	—	This Is LaWanda Lindsey
1974	"I Finally Gave Him Enough Rope to Hang"	—	—	singles only
1975	"Postcard Blues"	—	—	singles only
1975	"Goodtime Baby"	—	—	singles only
1975	"Let Your Fingers Do the Walkin'"	—	—	singles only
1975	"A Matter of Pride"	—	—	singles only
1977	"Walk Right Back"	76	—	singles only
1977	"Gone Forever (File Me Under Memories)"	—	—	singles only
1978	"I'm a Woman in Love"	85	—	singles only

=== Singles from collaboration albums ===
Year	Single	Artist	US Country	Album
1969	"Eye to Eye"	Kenny Vernon	58	Pickin' Wild Mountain Berries
1970	"Pickin' Wild Mountain Berries"	Kenny Vernon	27	Pickin' Wild Mountain Berries
1970	"Let's Think About Where We're Going"	Kenny Vernon	51	Pickin' Wild Mountain Berries
