= Big Girls Don't Cry (Lynn Anderson song) =

Single by Lynn Anderson

from the album Big Girls Don't Cry
- B-side: "Keep Forgettin'"
- Released: July 1968
- Genre: Country
- Label: Chart
- Songwriter(s): Liz Anderson
- Producer(s): Slim Williamson

Lynn Anderson singles chronology
| "No Another Time" (1968) | "Big Girls Don't Cry" (1968) | "Flattery Will Get You Everywhere" (1968) |

"Big Girls Don't Cry" is a single by American country music artist Lynn Anderson. Released in July 1968, it was the first single from her album Big Girls Don't Cry. The song peaked at number 12 on the Billboard Hot Country Singles chart. It also reached number 1 on the RPM Country Tracks chart in Canada.

The song should not be confused with the 1962 Four Seasons hit of the same name.

== Chart performance ==
| Chart (1968) | Peak position |
|---|---|
| U.S. Billboard Hot Country Singles | 12 |
| Canadian RPM Country Tracks | 1 |
