= Slim Williamson =

American record label owner

Bradley L. Williamson (November 21, 1927 – December 25, 2013), known professionally as Slim Williamson, was an American record executive who owned several record labels. He purchased the Chart label in 1964 from Gary Walker for $350.00. He died on December 25, 2013.

== Labels he owned/operated ==
- Chart Records
  - Great Records Co.
  - Music Town Records
- Sugar Hill Records (not affiliated with the Rap or Bluegrass labels of the same name)
- Peach Records
- Scorpion Records
- Yonah Records
