= Chart Records =

American record label

- Founded: 1960
- Founder: Slim Williamson

Chart Records was a country music record label of the 1960s, best known for turning Lynn Anderson into a major country star. It was owned by Slim Williamson.

The label was founded in 1964. Among the artists who recorded at one time for the label were Kenny Vernon, Johnny Bush, Junior Samples, Del Wood, Maxine Brown, Jim Nesbitt, Connie Eaton, Lynn Anderson, Red Sovine, Billy "Crash" Craddock, LaWanda Lindsey, Anthony Armstrong Jones and Doug Koempel. Many of the labels' vocalists were quite young, teenagers or in their early twenties, quite unusual during the 1960s for a country music label.

Chart was distributed by RCA Victor for several years during the 1960s and early 1970s. Today, Gusto Records owns the Chart Records catalogue except for the recordings by Lynn Anderson, which is owned by Sony Music Entertainment (the current owner of RCA Records), and has reissued a number of the recordings on CD.

The publishing arms of Chart Records were Yonah Music (BMI) and Peach Music (SESAC).

== See also ==
- List of record labels
