= Norma Jean discography =

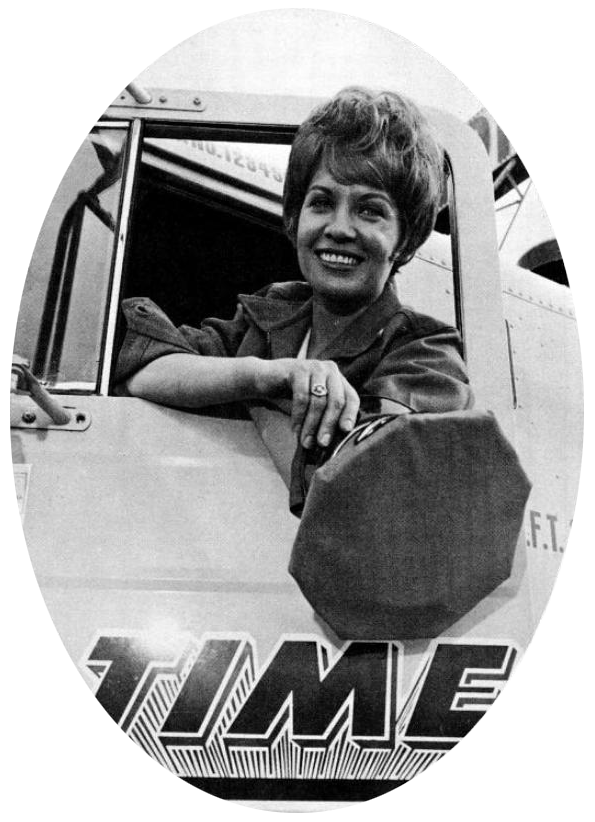
- Norma Jean in 1968
- Studio albums: 24
- Compilation albums: 7
- Singles: 38
- Other charted songs: 2
- Other album appearances: 10

The discography of American singer, Norma Jean contains 24 studio albums, seven compilation albums, 38 singles, two other charting songs and ten album appearances. Her first releases were four singles issued by Columbia Records between 1959 and 1960. In 1963, "Let's Go All the Way" reached number 11 on the US Hot Country Songs chart, becoming her first of 23 singles to place there. In 1964, "Go Cat Go" became her first top-10 single on the chart, peaking at number eight. It also was her only release to place on the US Bubbling Under Hot 100 chart, rising to number 34. Norma Jean had two more top-10 singles on the US country chart: "I Wouldn't Buy a Used Car from Him" (1965) and "The Game of Triangles" (1966). The latter was a duet with Bobby Bare and Liz Anderson that was issued on an album of the same name. Between 1964 and 1966, RCA Victor issued four studio albums of Norma Jean's material. This included the Pretty Miss Norma Jean (1965) and Please Don't Hurt Me (1966), both of which made the top-10 on the US Top Country Albums chart.

In 1967, all three of her studio LP's made the Top Country Albums survey: Norma Jean Sings Porter Wagoner, Jackson Ain't a Very Big Town and The Game of Triangles. Between 1966 and 1967, four of her solo singles made the top-40 on the US country chart: "The Shirt", "Pursuing Happiness", "Don't Let That Doorknob Hit You" and "Jackson Ain't a Very Big Town". The 1967 single, "Heaven Help the Working Girl", was her last top-20 appearance on the same chart. The following year, "You Changed Everything About Me But My Name", was her final single to make a top-40 US country chart appearance. RCA issued four studio LP's between 1968 and 1969, including the charting albums Body and Mind, Love's a Woman's Job and Country Giants. The label issued seven more studio albums through 1973 including It's Time for Norma Jean (1970), Norma Jean (1971) and Thank You for Loving Me (1972). The 1971 single, "The Kind of Needin' I Need", was her final solo release to make the country chart.

Norma Jean's next recordings were not released until the 1980s. This began in 1982 with a duet version of "Let's Go All the Way". A collaboration with Claude Gray, the single reached number 68 on the Hot Country Songs chart and was her final charting song. In 1983, the Roma label issued her first studio LP in nine years titled Pretty Miss...Norma Jean. It included the single "We Got a Good Thing Going". In 1995, she collaborated with Hermann Lammers Meyer on the German-issued single, "Faith in Santa" which appeared on his 1995 album, Till the End of Time. In April 2005, the Heart of Texas label released her first studio album in many years titled The Loneliest Star in Texas. The label also issued Norma Jean's Cowboy Church Gospel in 2012 and her most recent release titled Aged to Perfection in 2014.

== Albums ==
=== Studio albums ===
List of studio albums, with selected chart positions, and other relevant details
Title	Album details	Peak chart positions
Title	Album details	US Country
Let's Go All the Way	Released: November 1964; Label: RCA Victor; Formats: LP	—
Pretty Miss Norma Jean	Released: November 1965; Label: RCA Victor; Formats: LP	3
Please Don't Hurt Me	Released: May 1966; Label: RCA Victor; Formats: LP	8
Norma Jean Sings a Tribute to Kitty Wells	Released: November 1966; Label: RCA Victor; Formats: LP	23
The Game of Triangles (with Bobby Bare and Liz Anderson)	Released: January 1967; Label: RCA Victor; Formats: LP	18
Norma Jean Sings Porter Wagoner	Released: March 1967; Label: RCA Victor; Formats: LP	19
Jackson Ain't a Very Big Town	Released: August 1967; Label: RCA Victor; Formats: LP	11
Heaven's Just a Prayer Away	Released: January 1968; Label: RCA Victor; Formats: LP	44
Heaven Help the Working Girl	Released: March 1968; Label: RCA Camden; Formats: LP	—
Body and Mind	Released: May 1968; Label: RCA Victor; Formats: LP	37
Love's a Woman's Job	Released: November 1968; Label: RCA Victor; Formats: LP	39
Country Giants	Released: May 1969; Label: RCA Victor; Formats: LP	36
Another Man Loved Me Last Night	Released: April 1970; Label: RCA Victor; Formats: LP	—
It's Time for Norma Jean	Released: October 1970; Label: RCA Victor; Formats: LP	—
Norma Jean	Released: May 1971; Label: RCA Victor; Formats: LP	—
Norma Jean Sings Hank Cochran Songs	Released: August 1971; Label: RCA Victor; Formats: LP	—
Thank You for Loving Me	Released: April 1972; Label: RCA Victor; Formats: LP	—
I Guess That Comes from Being Poor	Released: August 1972; Label: RCA Victor; Formats: LP	—
The Only Way to Hold Your Man	Released: May 1973; Label: RCA Victor; Formats: LP	—
Pretty Miss...Norma Jean	Released: 1983; Label: Roma; Formats: LP	—
One Day at a Time (Note: One Day at a Time was originally released as a cassette via Roma Records during the 1980s. The specific date is unknown and a catalog number does not exist for this album. A digital re-release from Apple Music cites a date of June 30, 1995 release on Heart of Texas Records.)	Released: June 30, 1995; Label: Roma/Heart of Texas; Formats: Cassette	—
Loneliest Star in Texas	Released: April 6, 2005; Label: Heart of Texas; Formats: CD	—
Norma Jean's Cowboy Church Gospel	Released: 2012; Label: Heart of Texas; Formats: CD	—
Aged to Perfection	Released: January 28, 2014; Label: Heart of Texas; Formats: CD	—
"—" denotes a recording that did not chart or was not released in that territory.

=== Compilation albums ===
List of compilation albums, with selected chart positions, and other relevant details
Title	Album details	Peak chart positions
Title	Album details	US Country
The Country's Favorite	Released: December 1965; Label: Harmony; Formats: LP	—
The Best of Norma Jean	Released: October 1969; Label: RCA Victor; Formats: LP	26
It Wasn't God Who Made Honky Tonk Angels	Released: July 1971; Label: RCA Camden; Formats: LP	—
My Best to You	Released: 1996; Label: Roma; Formats: CD	—
The Best of Norma Jean	Released: February 8, 2000; Label: BMG/Collector's Choice; Formats: CD	—
The Essential Norma Jean: The RCA Years	Released: November 16, 2018; Label: Sony; Formats: Digital	—
Columbia Singles	Release date: March 29, 2019; Label: Sony; Formats: Digital	—
"—" denotes a recording that did not chart or was not released in that territory.

== Singles ==
List of singles, with selected chart positions, showing other relevant details
Title	Year	Peak chart positions		Album
Title	Year	US Bub.	US Cou.	Album
"Chapel Bells"	1959	—	—	—N/a
"You Called Me Another Woman's Name"	1959	—	—	—N/a
"Just Like I Knew"	1960	—	—	—N/a
"Someplace to Cry"	1960	—	—	—N/a
"Let's Go All the Way"	1963	—	11	Let's Go All the Way
"I'm a Walkin' Advertisement (For the Blues)"	1964	—	32	Let's Go All the Way
"Go Cat Go"	1964	34	8	Pretty Miss Norma Jean
"I Cried All the Way to the Bank"	1965	—	21	Pretty Miss Norma Jean
"I Wouldn't Buy a Used Car from Him"	1965	—	8	Pretty Miss Norma Jean
"You're Driving Me Out of My Mind"	1965	—	41	Please Don't Hurt Me
"The Shirt"	1966	—	28	Please Don't Hurt Me
"Pursuing Happiness" (Note: In August 1967, "Pursuing Happiness" was re-released as part of the track listing of the studio album Jackson Ain't a Very Big Town.)	1966	—	28	The Game of Triangles
"The Game of Triangles" (with Bobby Bare and Liz Anderson)	1966	—	5	The Game of Triangles
"Don't Let That Doorknob Hit You" (Note: In August 1967, "Don't Let the Doorknob Hit You" was re-released as part of the track listing of the studio album Jackson Ain't a Very Big Town.)	1966	—	24	The Game of Triangles
"Conscience Keep an Eye on Me"	1967	—	48	Jackson Ain't a Very Big Town
"Chet's Tune" (credited as Some of Chet's Friends)	1967	—	38	—N/a
"Jackson Ain't a Very Big Town"	1967	—	38	Jackson Ain't a Very Big Town
"Heaven Help the Working Girl"	1967	—	18	Heaven Help the Working Girl
"Truck Driving Woman"	1968	—	53	Body and Mind
"You Changed Everything About Me But My Name"	1968	—	35	Love's a Woman's Job
"One Man Band"	1968	—	61	—N/a
"Dusty Road"	1969	—	44	Country Giants
"These Flowers"	1969	—	—	Another Man Loved Me Last Night
"Long Ago Is Gone"	1969	—	—	Another Man Loved Me Last Night
"Somebody's Gonna Plow Your Field"	1970	—	—	Another Man Loved Me Last Night
"Another Man Loved Me Last Night"	1970	—	—	Another Man Loved Me Last Night
"Whiskey-Six Years Old"	1970	—	48	It's Time for Norma Jean
"The Kind of Needin' I Need"	1971	—	42	Thank You for Loving Me
"That Song Writtin' Man (Has Wrote My Mind)"	1971	—	—	Norma Jean
"Chicken Every Sunday"	1971	—	—	Thank You for Loving Me
"Thank You for Loving Me"	1972	—	—	Thank You for Loving Me
"Hundred Dollar Funeral"	1972	—	—	I Guess That Comes from Being Poor
"I Guess That Comes from Being Poor"	1972	—	—	I Guess That Comes from Being Poor
"The Only Way to Hold Your Man"	1973	—	—	The Only Way to Hold Your Man
"I Can't Sleep with You"	1973	—	—	The Only Way to Hold Your Man
"Let's Go All the Way" (with Claude Gray)	1982	—	68	—N/a
"We've Got a Good Thing Going"	1983	—	—	Pretty Miss...Norma Jean
"Faith in Santa" (with Hermann Lammers Meyer)	1995	—	—	Till the End of Time
"—" denotes a recording that did not chart or was not released in that territory.

== Other charted songs ==
List of songs, with selected chart positions, showing other relevant details
Title	Year	Peak chart positions	Album	Notes
Title	Year	US Country	Album	Notes
"Put Your Arms Around Her"	1964	25	Let's Go All the Way	(Note: B-side to "I'm a Walkin' Advertisement (For the Blues)".)
"Then Go Home to Her"	1965	48	Please Don't Hurt Me	(Note: B-side to "You're Driving Me Out of My Mind".)

== Other album appearances ==
List of non-single guest appearances, with other performing artists, showing year released and album name
Title	Year	Other artist(s)	Album	Ref.
"I'll Take a Chance on Loving You"	1963	Porter Wagoner	The Porter Wagoner Show	
"Silver Threads and Golden Needles"	1963	—N/a	The Porter Wagoner Show	
"I Want to Live Again"	1963	—N/a	The Porter Wagoner Show	
"It Keeps Right On a-Hurtin'	1963	—N/a	The Porter Wagoner Show	
"Head Over Heels in Love with You"	1964	—N/a	Porter Wagoner in Person Recorded Live	
I Didn't Mean It"	1964	—N/a	Porter Wagoner in Person Recorded Live	
"Talk Back Trembling Lips"	1964	—N/a	Porter Wagoner in Person Recorded Live	
"Private Little World"	1964	—N/a	Porter Wagoner in Person Recorded Live	
"Have I Told You Lately That I Love You?"	2011	Joe Paul Nichols	Friends in High Places	
"Let's Go All the Way"	2018	Buck Trent	Spartanburg Blues	
