= Liz Anderson discography =

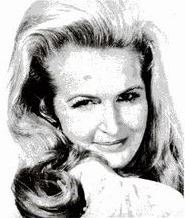
- Liz Anderson, 1971
- Studio albums: 12
- Singles: 23

The discography of American country singer-songwriter Liz Anderson consists of 12 studio albums and 23 singles. Her early songwriting produced hits for Merle Haggard that brought a recording contract from RCA Victor Records in 1964. Her first charting single was 1966's "Go Now Pay Later," which reached number 23 on the Billboard Hot Country Singles chart. The same year, Anderson collaborated with Bobby Bare and Norma Jean on the duet "The Game of Triangles." The song reached the top five of the Billboard country chart. In 1967, she had her biggest solo hit with "Mama Spank," which also reached the country top five. Anderson was also releasing studio albums for RCA. This included her third release, Liz Anderson Sings (1967), which peaked at number 20 on the Billboard Top Country Albums chart. Anderson's fourth studio effort, Cookin' Up Hits, reached number 18 on the same chart.

Anderson continued having top 40 hit singles on the Billboard country chart through 1968. This included "Tiny Tears" and "Mother, May I." The latter was a duet with her daughter, Lynn Anderson. Anderson recorded several more unsuccessful albums before the release of 1970's Husband Hunting. The album reached number 36 on the country albums survey, her final charting album release. The title track reached number 26 on the Billboard country songs chart, her final top 40 hit. Shortly after its release, she switched to Epic Records and recorded several singles, most notably a country version of "I'll Never Fall in Love Again." Her 1973 Epic release, "Time to Love Again," was her final charting single, reaching number 72 on the country chart. Anderson continued sporadically releasing new studio albums. This included two records of children's music. Her final studio effort was issued in 2004.

== Albums ==
=== Studio albums ===
List of studio albums, with selected chart positions, and other relevant details
Title	Album details	Peak chart positions
Title	Album details	US Country
(My Friends Are Gonna Be) Strangers	Released: June 1966; Label: RCA Camden; Formats: LP	—
The Game of Triangles (with Bobby Bare and Norma Jean)	Released: January 1967; Label: RCA Victor; Formats: LP	18
Liz Anderson Sings	Released: April 1967; Label: RCA Victor; Formats: LP	20
Cookin' Up Hits	Released: September 1967; Label: RCA Victor; Formats: LP	18
Liz Anderson Sings Her Favorites	Released: January 1968; Label: RCA Victor; Formats: LP	16
Like a Merry-Go Round	Released: July 1968; Label: RCA Victor; Formats: LP	22
Country Style	Released: January 1969; Label: RCA Victor; Formats: LP	—
If the Creek Don't Rise	Released: October 1969; Label: RCA Victor; Formats: LP	—
Husband Hunting	Released: March 1970; Label: RCA Victor; Formats: LP	36
My Last Rose	Released: 1983; Label: Tudor; Formats: LP	—
Christmas Songs for Kids of All Ages (Note: Later re-released in 2004 as The Fairy Grandmother Sings Children's Christmas Songs) (with Casey Anderson)	Released: November 1988; Label: Showboat; Formats: LP	—
The Fairy Grandmother Sings Children's Songs for National Holidays	Released: November 24, 2004; Label: Showboat; Formats: CD	—
"—" denotes a recording that did not chart or was not released in that territory.

== Singles ==
List of singles, with selected chart positions, and other relevant details
Title	Year	Peak chart positions		Album
Title	Year	US Country	CAN Country	Album
"Go Now Pay Later"	1966	23	—	(My Friends Are Gonna Be) Strangers
"So Much for Me, So Much for You"	1966	45	—	Liz Anderson Sings
"The Game of Triangles" (with Bobby Bare and Norma Jean)	1966	5	—	The Game of Triangles
"Wife of the Party"	1966	22	—	The Game of Triangles
"Mama Spank"	1967	5	—	Liz Anderson Sings
"Tiny Tears"	1967	24	—	Cookin' Up Hits
"Thanks a Lot for Tryin' Anyway"	1967	40	—	Liz Anderson Sings Her Favorites
"Mother, May I" (with Lynn Anderson)	1968	21	16	—N/a
"Like a Merry-Go Round"	1968	43	—	Like a Merry-Go Round
"Me, Me, Me, Me, Me"	1968	65	—	Like a Merry-Go Round
"Love Is Ending"	1968	51	—	Like a Merry-Go Round
"Free"	1969	—	—	Country Style
"Excedrin Headache No. 99"	1969	—	—	If the Creek Don't Rise
"If the Creek Don't Rise"	1969	—	—	If the Creek Don't Rise
"Husband Hunting"	1970	26	—	Husband Hunting
"All Day Sucker"	1970	64	—	—N/a
"When I'm Not Lookin'"	1970	75	—	—N/a
"It Don't Do No Good to Be a Good Girl"	1971	69	—	—N/a
"I'll Never Fall in Love Again"	1972	56	—	—N/a
"Astrology"	1972	67	—	—N/a
"Time to Love Again"	1973	72	—	—N/a
"After You"	1978	—	—	—N/a
"Christopher the Christmas Seal"	1988	—	—	Christmas Songs for Kids of All Ages
"—" denotes a recording that did not chart or was not released in that territory.
