= Jackson Ain't a Very Big Town (album) =

Studio album by Norma Jean
- Released: August 1967
- Studio: Nashville Sound Studio
- Genre: Country
- Label: RCA Victor
- Producer: Bob Ferguson

Norma Jean chronology
Norma Jean Sings Porter Wagoner (1967)	Jackson Ain't a Very Big Town (1967)	Heaven's Just a Prayer Away (1968)

Singles from Jackson Ain't a Very Big Town
- 1. "Pursuing Happiness" Released: July 1966; 2. "Don't Let That Doorknob Hit You" Released: October 1966; 3. "Conscience Keep an Eye on Me" Released: March 1967; 4. "Jackson Ain't a Very Big Town" Released: July 1967

Jackson Ain't a Very Big Town is a studio album by American singer, Norma Jean. It was released in August 1967 and was the seventh studio album of her career. The 11-track collection of country tunes featured three singles, including the US top-40 country recordings "Pursuing Happiness", "Don't Let That Doorknob Hit You" and the title track. The project received positive reviews from music publications who praised Norma Jean's performances and its production. The album itself made the US country top-20 in 1967.

== Background, recording and content ==
Norma Jean found success in the country genre as a cast member of The Porter Wagoner Show, which led to a recording contract with RCA Victor. The contract led to a string of successful US country songs in the 1960s including the top-10 singles "Go Cat Go" and "The Game of Triangles". She also had top-30 singles, such as "Don't Let That Doorknob Hit You". The latter (along with three additional charting songs) was included on Norma Jean's next studio record, Jackson Ain't a Very Big Town. According to the liner notes, the project was recorded at RCA's "Nashville Sound Studio", which was also located in Nashville, Tennessee. Production was credited to Bob Ferguson (who also wrote the liner notes) and engineering was credited to Jim Malloy. Jackson Ain't a Very Big Town consisted of 11 tracks in total.

== Critical reception ==
Jackson Ain't a Very Big Town was met with positive reception from music publications. Billboard found the project had "heart-touching performances" and called it "all-around entertaining". Cash Box opened its review by calling it "a striking effort from beginning to end". They also described the album's production as "excellent". Record World found the album had "juicy c/w [country and western] ditties" and praised Norma Jean for "constantly fulfilling and surpassing expectations" on her album projects. They also rated it four stars. AllMusic did not provide a written review but gave it four out of five stars.

== Release, chart performance and singles ==
Jackson Ain't a Very Big Town was released by RCA Victor in August 1967 and was her seventh studio album. It was offered in two vinyl LP formats: monaural or stereo. The disc reached the number 11 position on the US Billboard Top Country Albums chart, becoming her fifth to make the top-20 and sixth overall album to make the chart. Four singles were included on Jackson Ain't a Very Big Town. Its oldest single was "Pursuing Happiness", which was originally released by RCA Victor in July 1966. It reached the number 28 position on the US Billboard Hot Country Songs chart in late 1967. Its second oldest single release was "Don't Let That Doorknob Hit You", which was first released in October 1966 and went to number 28 on the US Billboard Hot Country Songs chart in early 1967. Both latter recordings were first included on the album The Game of Triangles in early 1967. "Conscience Keep an Eye on Me" was released in March 1967 as a single and reached number 48 on the same US country chart. The title track was released as single in July 1967, peaking at the number 38 position on the US country chart in late 1967.

== Track listing ==
Side one
No.	Title	Writer(s)	Length
1.	"Jackson Ain't a Very Big Town"	Vic McAlpin	2:25
2.	"Walk Through This World with Me"	Sandy Seamons; Kaye Savage	2:40
3.	"Conscience Keep an Eye on Me"	Glen Goza; Jack Rhodes	2:33
4.	"Pursuing Happiness"	Harlan Howard	2:27
5.	"Ride, Ride, Ride"	Liz Anderson	1:40
6.	"You Ain't Woman Enough"	Loretta Lynn	2:09

Side two
No.	Title	Writer(s)	Length
1.	"Your Alibi Called Today"	Hank Cochran	2:08
2.	"Try Being Lonely"	Buck Trent; George McCormick	1:51
3.	"It's About Time"	Lola Jean Dillon	2:22
4.	"From the Church to the Barroom"	Rachelle Frazier	2:50
5.	"Don't Let That Doorknob Hit You"	McAlpin	2:05
6.	"Now It's Every Night"	Joe "Red" Hayes	2:22

== Charts ==
Chart (1967)	Peak position
US Top Country Albums (Billboard)	11

== Release history ==
Release history and formats for Jackson Ain't a Very Big Town
Region	Date	Format	Label	Ref.
Various	August 1967	Vinyl LP (mono); vinyl LP (stereo)	RCA Victor	
