= Don't Let That Doorknob Hit You =

Single by Norma Jean

from the album The Game of Triangles
- B-side: "Company's Comin'"
- Released: October 1966
- Genre: Country
- Length: 2:05
- Label: RCA Victor
- Songwriter: Vic McAlpin
- Producer: Bob Ferguson

Norma Jean singles chronology
"The Game of Triangles" (1966)	"Don't Let That Doorknob Hit You" (1966)	"Conscience Keep an Eye on Me" (1967)

"Don't Le That Doorknob Hit You" is a song written by Vic McAlpin that was originally recorded by American singer, Norma Jean. Released as a single by RCA Victor, it reached the top-40 on the chart in early 1967. It was given positive reviews by music publications following its release.

== Background, recording and content ==
Norma Jean was known as the musical partner and cast member of Porter Wagoner's show, along with her own solo country music career in the 1960s. She had top-10 country hits with "Go Cat Go" and "The Game of Triangles", followed by the 1967 top-30 hit "Don't Let That Doorknob Hit You". Produced by Bob Ferguson and composed by Vic McAlpin, "Don't Let That Doorknob Hit You" is a song about a woman who tells her spouse to leave their home.

== Release, critical reception and chart performance ==
"Don't Let That Doorknob Hit You" was released as a single by RCA Victor in October 1966 and was distributed as a seven-inch vinyl disc. It featured a B-side titled "Company's Comin'". It received positive reviews from music publications at the time of its release. Cash Box described it as a "walloping ditty" Record World described the song as "striking" in their review while Billboard believed that just its title alone would help it sell records. It debuted on the US Billboard Hot Country Songs chart on November 19, 1966. Spending 11 weeks there, it reached number 28 on the chart in early 1967, becoming Norma Jean's ninth top-40 entry on that chart. It was later featured on the collaborative studio album with Liz Anderson and Bobby Bare called The Game of Triangles. It was also featured months later on the solo album Jackson Ain't a Very Big Town.

== Track listing ==
7" vinyl single

- "Don't Let That Doorknob Hit You" – 2:05
- "Company's Comin'" – 2:08

== Charts ==
Chart (1966–1967)	Peak position
US Hot Country Songs (Billboard)	28
