= I Wouldn't Buy a Used Car from Him =

Single by Norma Jean

from the album Pretty Miss Norma Jean
- B-side: "I'm No Longer in Your Heart"
- Released: July 1965
- Genre: Country
- Length: 1:58
- Label: RCA Victor
- Songwriter: Harlan Howard
- Producer: Bob Ferguson

Norma Jean singles chronology
"I Cried All the Way to the Bank" (1965)	"I Wouldn't Buy a Used Car from Him" (1965)	"You're Driving Me Out of My Mind" (1965)

"I Wouldn't Buy a Used Car from Him" is a song written by Harlan Howard that was originally recorded by American singer, Norma Jean. Released as a single in 1965, it became the second song of her career to make the top-10 on the US country chart. It received a positive review from Cash Box magazine as well.

== Background, recording and content ==
Although known for being a regular member of Porter Wagoner's television show, Norma Jean had her own recording career in the 1960s with songs that reflected working class values. After signing to RCA Victor, she had a top-15 country hit with "Let's Go All the Way" and a top-10 hit with "Go Cat Go". "I Wouldn't Buy a Used Car from Him" would also become a commercial success. The song was composed by Harlan Howard and was produced by Bob Ferguson. It told the story of a woman who is describing her views on a former lover.

== Release, critical reception and chart performance ==
"I Wouldn't Buy a Used Car from Him" was released as a single by RCA Victor in July 1965 and was distributed as a seven-inch vinyl disc. It also featured the B-side, "I'm No Longer in Your Heart". In its country music reviews, Cash Box magazine named it one of its "Bullseye" selections, meaning it was one of their highest-recommended singles for the week the publication was issued. It described the song as "rompin'" and a "bouncer", believing it would be a hit for Norma Jean. No formal review was given by Billboard, however, the magazine did predict the song would reach its country music chart. This prediction proved true when "I Wouldn't Buy a Used Car from Him" debuted on the US Billboard Hot Country Songs survey on July 31, 1965. It spent 14 weeks there and reached the number eight position later in the year. It became Norma Jean's second top-10 single on the chart and one of three top-10 songs in her career. It was later included on her second studio album titled Pretty Miss Norma Jean (1965).

== Track listing ==
7" vinyl single

- "I Wouldn't Buy a Used Car from Him" – 1:58
- "I'm No Longer in Your Heart" – 2:32

== Charts ==
Chart (1965)	Peak position
US Hot Country Songs (Billboard)	8
