= Shirt (disambiguation) =

A shirt is a type of garment worn for the upper body.

Shirt may also refer to:

== Music ==
- Shirt (artist), American rapper and conceptual artist
- "Shirt" (song) by SZA, from the album SOS (2022)
- "The Shirt" (song) by Norma Jean, from the album Please Don't Hurt Me (1966)

== See also ==
- T-Shirt (disambiguation)
