= Please Don't Hurt Me =

Studio album by Norma Jean
- Released: May 1966
- Studio: Nashville Sound Studio
- Genre: Country
- Label: RCA Victor
- Producers: Chet Atkins; Bob Ferguson

Norma Jean chronology
Pretty Miss Norma Jean (1965)	Please Don't Hurt Me (1966)	Norma Jean Sings a Tribute to Kitty Wells (1966)

Singles from Please Don't Hurt Me
- 1. "You're Driving Me Out of My Mind"/"Then Go Home to Her" Released: November 1965; 2. "The Shirt" Released: March 1966

Please Don't Hurt Me is a studio album by American singer, Norma Jean. It was released by RCA Victor in May 1966 and was the third studio disc of her career. The 12-track country collection included her singles from that time period: "The Shirt" and "You're Driving Me Out of Mind". Both reached the US Hot Country Songs chart in 1966 while the album itself made the US Top Country Albums top-10. It was given a positive reception by music magazines.

== Background, recording and content ==
Norma Jean found country music success in the 1960s as a member of The Porter Wagoner Show and with solo singles that reflected working class romantic values. Among her popular recordings from this period was a song called "The Shirt", which would become part of the track listing for the studio album, Please Don't Hurt Me. The album was co-produced by Chet Atkins and Bob Ferguson. According to the liner notes, it was made at "RCA Victor's Nashville Sound Studio", which was also located in Nashville, Tennessee. Please Don't Hurt Me consisted of 12 tracks in total, including several "heartachers" (according to Billboard) like "The Box It Came In", "Then Go Home to Her" and the title track.

== Critical reception ==
Music publications positively commented that Please Don't Hurt Me had sales potential within it. Billboard magazine believed the disc would sell well with listeners, writing that she "has another sales winner in this LP". Cash Box magazine similarly spoke of it being a high-selling album and wrote, "Pretty miss Norma Jean should score well in the country markets with this potent album session." The publication further wrote, "The album is bound to appeal to many of the lark’s fans, who could well carve a niche for the set on the c&w best seller lists." AllMusic did not write a formal review but gave it four out of five stars.

== Release, chart performance and singles ==
Please Don't Hurt Me was released by RCA Victor in May 1966 and was her third studio album in total. It was offered as a vinyl LP either in monaural or stereo formats. The album placed within the top-10 on the US Billboard Top Country Albums chart in 1966. It became her second album to make the chart and the second to make the top-10. A total of two singles were included on Please Don't Hurt Me. Its earliest single offering was "You're Driving Me Out of My Mind", which RCA first released in November 1965. The song reached number 41 on the US Hot Country Songs chart in early 1966, while the single's B-side ("Then Go Home to Her") reached number 48. "The Shirt" was issued originally as a single in March 1966 and reached number 28 on the US country chart.

== Track listing ==
Side one
No.	Title	Writer(s)	Length
1.	"You're Driving Me Out of My Mind"	Gayle Smith	2:23
2.	"The Shirt"	Bill Anderson; Mel Strickland; George Bailey	3:00
3.	"Will You Be Here Tomorrow"	Vic McAlpin	2:33
4.	"A Woman's Gotta Make a Stand"	Curly Putman; Don Wayne	2:11
5.	"A-11"	Hank Cochran	2:08
6.	"Crying Time"	Buck Owens	2:11

Side two
No.	Title	Writer(s)	Length
1.	"Right or Wrong (I'll Be with You)"	Wanda Jackson	2:23
2.	"Then Go Home to Her"	Cochran; Jeannie Seely	2:20
3.	"Watch Where You're Going"	Don Gibson	2:02
4.	"Here We Go Again"	Dusty Rose	2:00
5.	"The Box It Came In"	McAlpin	2:13
6.	"Please Don't Hurt Me"	Harlan Howard	2:21

== Personnel ==
All credits are adapted from the liner notes of Please Don't Hurt Me.

- Chet Atkins – Producer
- Bob Ferguson – Producer
- Harlan Howard – Sleeve notes
- Check Seitz – Engineer

== Charts ==
Chart (1966)	Peak position
US Top Country Albums (Billboard)	8

== Release history ==
Release history and formats for Please Don't Hurt Me
Region	Date	Format	Label	Ref.
Various	November 1964	Vinyl LP (mono); vinyl LP (stereo)	RCA Victor	
Various	Circa 2020	Music download; streaming	Sony Music Entertainment	
