= Jackson Ain't a Very Big Town =

Single by Norma Jean

from the album Jackson Ain't a Very Big Town
- B-side: "Now It's Every Night"
- Released: July 1967
- Genre: Country
- Length: 2:25
- Label: RCA Victor
- Songwriter: Vic McAlpin
- Producer: Bob Ferguson

Norma Jean singles chronology
"Chet's Tune" (1967)	"Jackson Ain't a Very Big Town" (1967)	"Heaven Help the Working Girl" (1967)

"Jackson Ain't a Very Big Town" is a song written by Vic McAlpin that was originally recorded by American singer, Norma Jean. It was released as a single for the country music market, reaching the Billboard country top-40 in 1967. It was given positive reviews by music publications following its release.

== Background ==
Norma Jean had a series of commercially successful country music singles during the 1960s with subjects that varied from comical to melancholy. Among the singles that discussed heartbreak was the ballad "Jackson Ain't a Very Big Town". Written by Vic McAlpin and produced by Bob Ferguson,

== Release, critical reception and chart performance ==
"Jackson Ain't a Very Big Town" was released as a single by RCA Victor in July 1967 and was issued as a seven-inch vinyl disc with a B-side titled "Now It's Every Night". Music publications predicted the single would be successful. Billboard predicted it would reach their country top-10 list and called it "a clever piece of material" with a "well thought out lyric line". Cash Box thought it would make the top-50 of their chart and thought fans would buy the recording "in a hurry". Record World called it "an instant hit". It debuted on the US Billboard Hot Country Songs chart on August 19, 1967 and spent 10 weeks there, rising to the number 38 position in late 1967. It was also her tenth top-40 Billboard country single in her career. It later served as the title track to her studio album of the same name.

== Track listing ==
7" vinyl single

- "Jackson Ain't a Very Big Town" – 2:25
- "Now It's Every Night" – 2:22

== Charts ==
Chart (1967)	Peak position
US Hot Country Songs (Billboard)	38
