= Heaven's Just a Prayer Away =

Studio album by Norma Jean
- Released: January 1968
- Studio: Nashville Sound Studio
- Genre: Gospel
- Label: RCA Victor
- Producer: Bob Ferguson

Norma Jean chronology
Jackson Ain't a Very Big Town (1967)	Heaven's Just a Prayer Away (1968)	Heaven Help the Working Girl (1968)

Heaven's Just a Prayer Away is a studio album by American singer, Norma Jean. It was released in January 1968 by RCA Victor and was her eighth studio album in her career. The disc was a collection of gospel songs featuring several cover tunes. It was received well by music publications who praised its song selection and vocal performance. The album reached the top-50 of the US country chart.

== Background ==
Norma Jean was the duet partner of Porter Wagoner on his television show and had a series of commercially-successful country songs in the 1960s about working class people. Along with top-10 hits like "Go Cat Go" and a series of secular studio albums, she also had an album of gospel songs, which would be Heaven's Just a Prayer Away. According to its liner notes, Heaven's Just a Prayer Away was cut recorded at the RCA "Nashville Sound Studio", which was also located in Nashville, Tennessee. The album was produced by Bob Ferguson and was engineered by Jim Malloy. The product was a collection of 12 songs, many of which were cut in an upbeat tempo like "There's a Higher Power" and "Supper Time". Cover of popular gospel tunes are also included like "Precious Memories", "I Saw the Light" and "Farther Along".

== Release, critical reception and chart performance ==
Heaven's Just a Prayer Away was released by RCA Victor in January 1968 and was Norma Jean's eighth studio album. It was offered in two vinyl LP formats: monaural or stereo. It received positive reviews from music magazines after its release. Billboard wrote that it was "possibly one of the best albums of this nature by a country artist all year", crediting her vocals and song choices. Cash Box called it "an excellent collection of gospel tunes and songs of faith" that gives "make quite an impression with the lark's voluminous following." AllMusic did not write a written review but did give the product three out of five possible stars. In 1968, Heaven's Just a Prayer Away peaked at number 44 on the US Billboard Top Country Albums chart. It was her lowest-charting album to make the country chart and also her seventh album to make the chart in her career.

== Track listing ==
Side one
No.	Title	Writer(s)	Length
1.	"I'm Gonna Walk and Talk with My Lord"	Martha Carson	2:09
2.	"The Tramp on the Street"	Grady Cole; Hazel Cole	3:59
3.	"Life's Railway to Heaven"	Traditional	3:03
4.	"Farther Along" (arranged by J. R. Baxter)	Traditional	2:28
5.	"The Great Speckled Bird"	Carl Smith	2:20
6.	"I Saw the Light"	Hank Williams	2:27

Side two
No.	Title	Writer(s)	Length
1.	"There's a Higher Power"	Charlie Louvin; Ira Louvin	2:26
2.	"Where the Roses Never Fade"	Elsie Osborn; Jack Osborn; Jim Miller	2:42
3.	"Suppertime"	Ira Stanphill	2:35
4.	"Precious Memories"	J. B. F. Wright	2:58
5.	"A Gathering in the Sky"	Wayne Rainey; R. E. Winsett	1:53
6.	"Heaven's Just a Prayer Away"	Tommy Tomlinson	2:38

== Charts ==
Chart (1968)	Peak position
US Top Country Albums (Billboard)	44

== Release history ==
Release history and formats for Heaven's Just a Prayer Away
Region	Date	Format	Label	Ref.
Various	January 1968	Vinyl LP (mono); vinyl LP (stereo)	RCA Victor	
Various	Circa 2020	Music download; streaming	Sony Music Entertainment	
