= Live at the Warfield =

Live at the Warfield may refer to:

- Live at the Warfield (Phil Lesh and Friends album) (2006)
- Live at the Warfield (Jerry Garcia Band album) (2025)
