= You Changed Everything About Me But My Name =

Single by Norma Jean

from the album Love's a Woman's Job
- B-side: "A-11"
- Released: June 1968
- Genre: Country
- Length: 2:16
- Label: RCA Victor
- Songwriters: Hank Cochran; Jeannie Seely
- Producer: Bob Ferguson

Norma Jean singles chronology
"Truck Driving Woman" (1968)	"You Changed Everything About Me But My Name" (1968)	"One Man Band" (1968)

"You Changed Everything About Me But My Name" is a song co-written by Hank Cochran and Jeannie Seely that was originally recorded by Seely herself for her 1968 album, I'll Love You More. The same year, it was recorded and released as a single by American singer, Norma Jean, and made the US country songs top-40. It received a positive response from critics following its release.

== Background and recording ==
Jeannie Seely established a professional relationship with Hank Cochran who mentored her and helped her sign a recording contract with Monument Records. Her 1966 debut-label release, "Don't Touch Me", became her breakthrough success as a music artist and was penned by Cochran. Together the pair wrote material, including "You Changed Everything About Me But My Name". Seely's version was produced by Fred Foster while Norma Jean's version was produced by Bob Ferguson.

== Releases, critical reception and chart performance ==
Seely's version of "You Changed Everything About Me But My Name" was released as an album track on her 1968 Monument studio album, I'll Love You More. It appeared on "side 2" as the fourth track. Norma Jean's version was issued as a single by RCA Victor in June 1968 and was backed on the B-side by the tune "A-11". Both Billboard and Cash Box predicted the song would yield high sales figures for Norma Jean and her label. The single version debuted on the US Billboard Hot Country Songs chart on July 20, 1968 and reached the number 35 position there. It became the final top-40 single of Norma Jean's career and among her final to chart. Her version of the song was released on the album Love's a Woman's Job.

== Track listing ==
7" vinyl single (Norma Jean)

- "You Changed Everything About Me But My Name" – 2:16
- "A-11" – 2:06

== Charts ==
Norma Jean version

Chart (1968)	Peak position
US Hot Country Songs (Billboard)	35
