= Garcia Live Volume 22 =

Live album by Jerry Garcia and Merl Saunders
- Released: May 1, 2026
- Recorded: September 25, 1971
- Venues: The Lion's Share; San Anselmo, California
- Genres: Rock, rhythm and blues
- Length: 89:14
- Label: Round / ATO
- Producers: Marc Allan, Kevin Monty

Merl Saunders and Jerry Garcia chronology
Garcia Live Volume 18 (2022)	Garcia Live Volume 22 (2026)

Jerry Garcia chronology
Live at the Warfield (2025)	Garcia Live Volume 22 (2026)	Garcia Live Volume 23 (2026)

Garcia Live Volume 22 is a two-CD live album by Jerry Garcia and Merl Saunders. It contains the early and late shows recorded on September 25, 1971, at the Lion's Share in San Anselmo, California (missing only the last song, which was "The Night They Drove Old Dixie Down"). It was released on May 1, 2026.

At this performance the lineup of the band was Jerry Garcia on guitar and vocals, Merl Saunders on keyboards and vocals, Tom Fogerty on guitar and vocals, John Kahn on bass, and Bill Kreutzmann on drums.

== Critical reception ==
In Glide Magazine, Doug Collette wrote, "Neither Garcia nor Saunders monopolizes the proceedings, though, preferring instead to draw in the other members of the ensemble as the improvisations develop into a singular display of low-key but sensitive musicianship. These interactions are inherently self-disciplined even in the most spontaneous moments."

On jambands.com, Kristopher Weiss said, "... featuring 90 minutes of the sound of Garcia transitioning away from his role as solely the Dead's frontman and toward the polymathic approach that would carry him toward Old & in the Way, Legion of Mary and the Jerry Garcia Band as the '70s unfolded."

== Track listing ==
Disc 1

Early show:

1. Band introductions – 1:03
2. "Save Mother Earth" > (Merl Saunders, Edmund Lewis) – 11:28
3. "Imagine" (John Lennon) – 5:25
4. "One Kind Favor" (Blind Lemon Jefferson) – 8:48
5. "I Was Made to Love Her" (Henry Cosby, Lula Mae Hardaway, Sylvia Rose Moy, Stevie Wonder) – 9:50
6. "Baby What You Want Me to Do?" (Jimmy Reed) – 3:49
7. "Biloxi" (Jesse Winchester) – 6:58

Disc 2

Late show:

1. "Hi-Heel Sneakers" (Robert Higginbotham) – 8:50
2. "Man-Child" > (Merl Saunders, Edmund Lewis) – 10:18
3. "Summertime" (George Gershwin, Ira Gershwin, Dorothy Heyward, DuBose Heyward) – 10:19
4. "That's a Touch I Like" (Jesse Winchester) – 6:01
5. "Annie Had a Baby" > (Henry Glover, Sydney Nathan) – 2:53
6. "W-P-L-J" (Luther McDaniel) – 3:23

== Personnel ==
Musicians

- Jerry Garcia – guitar, vocals
- Merl Saunders – keyboards, vocals
- Tom Fogerty – guitar, vocals
- John Kahn – bass
- Bill Kreutzmann – drums

Production

- Original recordings produced by Betty Cantor-Jackson and Bob Matthews
- Produced for release by Marc Allan and Kevin Monty
- Mastering: Fred Kevorkian
- Design, illustration: Chris Capotosto
- Liner notes essay: Joel Selvin
- Photos: Larry Hulst, Bob Marks, Jeffrey Mayer, Roberto Rabanne
