= Heaven Help the Working Girl =

Single by Norma Jean

from the album Heaven Help the Working Girl
- B-side: "Your Alibi Called Today"
- Released: October 1967
- Genre: Country
- Length: 2:03
- Label: RCA Victor
- Songwriter: Harlan Howard
- Producer: Bob Ferguson

Norma Jean singles chronology
"Jackson Ain't a Very Big Town" (1967)	"Heaven Help the Working Girl" (1967)	"Truck Driving Woman" (1968)

"Heaven Help the Working Girl" is a song written by Harlan Howard that was first recorded by American singer, Norma Jean. The country music tune told the story of a cafe waitress who experiences sexual advances by men at and was later the subject amongst authors for its early feminist lyrical content. It was released as a single in 1967 and reached the top-20 on the US country chart later the following year.

== Background and composition ==
Norma Jean found success in the country genre as the duet partner of Porter Wagoner, along with a successful string of recordings in the 1960s. Her popular singles featured stories about the American working class sector and heartbreak. One of her 1967 songs was "Heaven Help the Working Girl", which was composed by Harlan Howard. He wrote the track while working as a truck driver and it inspired him to write material specifically for women, according to Record World.

== Recording, content and impact ==
Produced by Bob Ferguson, "Heaven Help the Working Girl" was told from the point of view of a cafe waitress and the hardships she faces in a male-dominated society. Cash Box reviewed it in 1967 and wrote that it's an "easy-paced, slightly barbed comment on menfolk that should go over well with the gals." The song has since been discussed by writers who have theorized its connections to women's independence. AllMusic's James Manheim called it "an early feminist song", while author Rachel Lee Rubin theorized that it was a predecessor to the term sexual harassment for addressing unwanted advances by men. Other writers spoke differently of the song. While reviewing her 1967 album of the same name, Greg Adams (also of AllMusic) commented that it "strikes a less defiant tone than Tammy Wynette's 'Your Good Girl's Gonna Go Bad' from earlier the same year, evincing instead an air of weary resignation."

== Release and chart performance ==
"Heaven Help the Working Girl" was released as a single by RCA Victor in October 1967. It was distributed as a seven-inch vinyl disc and featured a B-side titled "Your Alibi Called Today". Billboard predicted that its "catchy rhythm" and "clever lyric content" will help it make their country top-10 list. Despite this prediction, it failed to reach the top-10 but instead made their top-20 list. "Heaven Help the Working Girl" debuted on the US Billboard Hot Country Songs chart on November 18, 1967 and spent 14 weeks there and rose to the number 18 position. It became her fifth and final song to place on the Billboard country top-20. It was also among her final top-40 single entries. It served as the title track to a studio album released by RCA Camden.

== Track listing ==
7" vinyl single

- "Heaven Help the Working Girl" – 2:03
- "Your Alibi Called Today" – 2:08

== Charts ==
Chart (1967–1968)	Peak position
US Hot Country Songs (Billboard)	18
