= Heaven Help the Working Girl (album) =

Studio album by Norma Jean
- Released: March 1968
- Studio: RCA Victor Studios
- Genre: Country
- Label: RCA Camden
- Producers: Bob Ferguson; Ethel Gabriel

Norma Jean chronology
Heaven's Just a Prayer Away (1967)	Heaven Help the Working Girl (1968)	Body and Mind (1966)

Singles from Heaven Help the Working Girl
- 1. "Heaven Help the Working Girl" Released: October 1967

Heaven Help the Working Girl is a studio album by American singer, Norma Jean. It was released as an experiment on RCA's budget subsidiary label called RCA Camden and was issued in March 1968. It included the title track, which was first issued as a single and made the top 20 on the US country songs chart. The album itself received mostly positive reviews by Billboard, Cash Box and AllMusic.

== Background ==
After being cast on Porter Wagoner's television show, Norma Jean found an audience with country music listeners and signed a recording contract with RCA Victor where she had a string of hit singles during the 1960s. Among them was 1967's "Heaven Help the Working Girl". Her next studio project was not planned to be released by RCA Victor for several months. However, the success of the latter single prompted RCA to rush-release an album for it to be included on. The label decided to name the album after the successful single and release it as an "experimental LP", according to Cash Box.

== Recording and content ==
According to the liner notes, Heaven Help the Working Girl was recorded at RCA Victor Studios in Nashville, Tennessee. The project was co-produced by Bob Ferguson and Ethel Gabriel. It also consisted of a total of ten tracks. Among its songs was the title track, which described the challenges of being a cafe waitress. A series of country music cover tunes from the era also appeared in the track listing. This included "A Little Bitty Tear", "Pick Me Up on Your Way Down" and "What Kind of a Girl (Do You Think I Am)". An additional track was written as an answer song to "My Elusive Dreams" and was titled "Your Elusive Dreams".

== Release, critical reception and single ==
Heaven Help the Working Girl was released in March 1968 on RCA's budget label called RCA Camden and was her first studio product issued with the subsidiary label. It was offered as a vinyl LP in both monaural and stereo formats. The project received a mostly positive critical response. Billboard described it as "high priced music and high priced talent on a low priced disk" and believed it would sell well. Cash Box also believed the album would yield high sales due to Norma Jean's popularity at the time and the title track. AllMusic's Greg Adams gave the project four out of five stars and found its track listing "adheres to standard country album formulae" for its inclusion of cover songs. The title track was first issued as a single in October 1967 and rose to the number 18 position on the US Hot Country Songs chart in early 1968.

== Track listing ==
Side one
No.	Title	Writer(s)	Length
1.	"What Locks the Door"	Vic McAlpin	2:05
2.	"A Woman in Love"	Charles Anderson	2:01
3.	"Pick Me Up on Your Way Down"	Harlan Howard	2:01
4.	"No One's Gonna Hurt You Anymore"	Steve Karliski; Ted Cooper	2:23
5.	"Don't Put Your Hands on Me"	Lorene Mann	2:05

Side two
No.	Title	Writer(s)	Length
1.	"Heaven Help the Working Girl"	Howard	2:02
2.	"Don't Put Your Hurt in My Heart"	Mickey Jaco	2:37
3.	"What Kind of a Girl (Do You Think I Am)"	Loretta Lynn; Teddy Wilburn	2:45
4.	"A Little Bitty Tear"	Hank Cochran	1:50
5.	"Your Elusive Dreams"	Billy Sherrill; Curly Putman	2:38

== Release history ==
Release history and formats for Heaven Help the Working Girl
Region	Date	Format	Label	Ref.
Various	March 1968	Vinyl LP (mono); vinyl LP (stereo)	RCA Camden	
Japan	1972	Vinyl LP (stereo)	RCA; RCA Camden	
