= Live at Sonoma State – 11/4/73 =

Live album by Old & In the Way
- Released: November 4, 2023
- Recorded: November 4, 1973
- Venue: Sonoma State College
- Genre: Bluegrass
- Length: 74:42
- Label: Acoustic Oasis / Round Records
- Producer: David Grisman

Old & In the Way chronology
Live at the Boarding House: The Complete Shows (2013)	Live at Sonoma State – 11/4/73 (2023)

Jerry Garcia chronology
Garcia Live Volume 20 (2023)	Live at Sonoma State – 11/4/73 (2023)	Garcia Live Volume 21 (2024)

David Grisman chronology
The Dawg Trio (2019)	Live at Sonoma State – 11/4/73 (2023)	Dawgnilo! (2024)

Live at Sonoma State – 11/4/73 is an album by the bluegrass band Old & In the Way. It contains the complete show recorded at Sonoma State College in Rohnert Park, California on November 4, 1973. It was released for downloading and streaming on November 4, 2023. It was released as a two-disc LP for Record Store Day on November 28, 2025. It was released as a CD, and re-released on vinyl, on August 21, 2026.

== Critical reception ==
In Relix, Jeff Tamarkin wrote, "... it may be the most stunning, uplifting performance ever given by this short-lived all-star bluegrass quintet... Old & In the Way straddled a fine line between traditionalism and "newgrass" experimentation... It's safe to presume that most of the audiences that came to see this group were there for Garcia; it's also a good guess that they left as fans of bluegrass music in general."

In Bluegrass Today, Lee Zimmerman said, "An archival offering of special significance, Live at Sonoma State – 11/4/73 not only reignites some special musical memories, but offers a profound tribute to a ground-breaking ensemble that helped infuse bluegrass tradition into the current realms of populist precepts."

== Track listing ==
1. "Goin' to the Races" (Carter Stanley) – 2:10
2. "Catfish John" (Bob McDill, Allen Reynolds) – 3:37
3. "Eating out of Your Hand" (Bill Harrell, Hope Harlow) – 2:44
4. "Lonesome Fiddle Blues" (Millie Clements, Vassar Clements) – 2:52
5. "Land of the Navajo" (Peter Rowan) – 7:16
6. "Old & In the Way Breakdown" (Jerry Garcia) – 3:20
7. "Panama Red" (Peter Rowan) – 2:43
8. "Pig in a Pen" (Fiddlin' Arthur Smith) – 2:36
9. "Fanny Hill" (David Grisman) – 3:14
10. "The Hobo Song" (Jack Bonus) – 4:54
11. "Wild Horses" (Mick Jagger, Keith Richards) – 4:38
12. "White Dove" (Carter Stanley) – 4:21
13. "Drifting Too Far from the Shore" (Charles E. Moody) – 4:30
14. "Uncle Pen" (Bill Monroe) – 2:29
15. "That High Lonesome Sound" (Peter Rowan) – 4:08
16. "Tramp on the Street" (Grady Cole, Hazel Cole) – 6:18
17. "Waiting for a Train" (Jimmie Rodgers) – 3:51
18. "Midnight Moonlight" (Peter Rowan) – 5:20
19. "Orange Blossom Special" (Ervin Rouse) – 3:31

== Personnel ==
Old & In the Way

- Jerry Garcia – banjo, vocals
- Vassar Clements – fiddle, vocals
- David Grisman – mandolin, vocals
- Peter Rowan – guitar, vocals
- John Kahn – bass

Additional musicians

- Ramblin' Jack Elliott – vocals, guitar on "Tramp on the Street" and "Waiting for a Train"

Production

- Produced by David Grisman
- Executive producer: Craig Miller
- Recording: Ed Perlstein
- Mastering: David Grisman, Neville Pearsall
- Project coordination: Lauren Goetzinger, Daniel Romanoff
- Design: Darryl Morsen, Taylor W. Rushing
- Photography: Nobumaru Komoriya, Roberto Rabanne
