= Norma Jean Sings Porter Wagoner =

Studio album by Norma Jean
- Released: March 1967
- Genre: Country
- Label: RCA Victor
- Producer: Bob Ferguson

Norma Jean chronology
The Game of Triangles (1967)	Norma Jean Sings Porter Wagoner (1967)	Jackson Ain't a Very Big Town (1967)

Norma Jean Sings Porter Wagoner is a studio album by American singer, Norma Jean. It was released in March 1967 by RCA Victor and was her fifth studio album. The project paid tribute to Porter Wagoner, who helped Norma Jean rise to fame in the country genre. On the album, she sings Wagoner's best-known material, along with some of his more recent music. It reached the top-20 on the US country albums survey in 1967.

== Background ==
Norma Jean found commercial success in country music after being cast on Porter Wagoner's television show in 1960. This led to a solo recording contract with RCA Victor and a string of top-40 country singles during the decade, including several that made the top-10. She then paid tribute to Wagoner by recording an album of his best-known songs and hits. The collection was produced by Bob Ferguson and were engineered by Jim Malloy. Malloy also wrote the project's liner notes and explained that Wagoner was not aware of the album's recording until they surprised him on his birthday by inviting him to a recording session. A total of 12 tracks comprised Norma Jean Sings Porter Wagoner, including popular Wagoner songs like "A Satisfied Mind" and a recent recording called "I Just Came to Smell the Flowers".

== Release, critical reception and chart performance ==
Norma Jean Sings Porter Wagoner was released by RCA Victor in March 1967 and was her sixth studio album. It was distributed as a vinyl LP, offered in either monaural or stereo formats. Cash Box magazine gave it a positive review, calling it "a heartfelt tribute to Porter Wagoner". A written review was not provided by AllMusic, however, the publication gave it 4.5 out of 5 stars. The disc reached number 19 on the US Billboard Top Country Albums chart in 1967, becoming her fifth album to reach the survey. It was also her fourth album to reach the chart's top-20 as well.

== Track listing ==
Side one
No.	Title	Writer(s)	Length
1.	"Dooley"	Mitch Jayne; Rodney Dillard	1:55
2.	"Eat, Drink And Be Merry (For Tomorrow You'll Cry)"	Celia and Sandra Ferguson	2:17
3.	"Country Music Has Gone to Town"	Jimmy Driftwood	2:10
4.	"Misery Loves Company"	Jerry Reed	2:50
5.	"I've Enjoyed as Much of This as I Can Stand"	Bill Anderson	2:25
6.	"Company's Comin'"	Johnny Mullins	2:08

Side two
No.	Title	Writer(s)	Length
1.	"Howdy Neighbor, Howdy"	James Morris	1:51
2.	"I Just Came to Smell the Flowers"	Vic McAlpin	2:27
3.	"A Satisfied Mind"	Red Hayes; Jack Rhodes	2:55
4.	"If Jesus Came to Your House"	Craig Blanchard	2:25
5.	"Your Old Love Letters"	Johnny Bond	2:09
6.	"I Thought I Heard You Calling My Name"	Lee Emerson	2:34

== Charts ==
Chart (1967)	Peak position
US Top Country Albums (Billboard)	19

== Release history ==
Release history and formats for Norma Jean Sings Porter Wagoner
Region	Date	Format	Label	Ref.
Various	March 1967	Vinyl LP (mono); vinyl LP (stereo)	RCA Victor	
Various	Circa 2020	Music download; streaming	Sony Music Entertainment	
