= The Game of Triangles (song) =

Single by Bobby Bare, Norma Jean and Liz Anderson

from the album The Game of Triangles
- B-side: "Bye Bye Love"
- Released: September 1966
- Genre: Country
- Length: 2:38
- Label: RCA Victor
- Songwriter: Cy Coben
- Producers: Chet Atkins; Bob Ferguson; Felton Jarvis

Bobby Bare singles chronology
"Streets of Baltimore" (1966)	"The Game of Triangles" (1966)	"Homesick" (1966)

Norma Jean singles chronology
"Pursuing Happiness" (1966)	"The Game of Triangles" (1966)	"Don't Let That Doorknob Hit You" (1966)

Liz Anderson singles chronology
"So Much for Me, So Much for You" (1966)	"The Game of Triangles" (1966)	"Wife of the Party" (1966)

"The Game of Triangles" is a song recorded as a three-part duet between American singers Bobby Bare, Norma Jean and Liz Anderson. The song told the story of an extramarital affair and tells the perspective of the three people involved. Released as a single by RCA Victor, it reached the top-10 on the US country songs chart in 1967 and was nominated for a Grammy award.

== Background ==
Three separate RCA country artists contributed to "The Game of Triangles", among them being Bobby Bare. Up to the point of its recording, Bare had recently shifted to the country genre after recording pop music. In country, he had a string of folk-influenced hits during the 1960s. Meanwhile, Liz Anderson was a secretary-turned country music songwriter whose songs were recorded by Merle Haggard and Roy Drusky, but she was given her own RCA recording contract during this time. Finally, Norma Jean had first gained success as a cast member of The Porter Wagoner Show but had a series of country hits whose lyrics were focused on working class values during the 1960s. This included "The Game of Triangles".

== Recording and content ==
All three singers were joined by their individual producers to record the track: Chet Atkins, Bob Ferguson and Felton Jarvis. The song told the story of a love triangle between a husband, his wife and the other woman. Each singer's voice described their perspective of the relationship and how it affected them. The role of the husband is played by Bare, while the wife is played by Anderson and the other woman is played by Norma Jean.

== Release, critical reception and chart performance ==
"The Game of Triangles" was released as a single by RCA Victor in September 1966 and featured a B-side titled "Bye Bye Love". It was distributed as a seven-inch vinyl disc. Billboard called it a "top country tune" and predicted it would make their country music top-10 list. The single entered the US Billboard Hot Country Songs chart on October 15, 1966 and spent 17 weeks there, rising to the number five position in early 1967. The song served as the title and lead single to the trio's only studio album together in early 1967. It was later nominated by the Grammy Awards for Best Country & Western Performance Duet, Trio or Group (Vocal or Instrumental) in 1968.

== Track listing ==
7" vinyl single

- "The Game of Triangles" – 2:38
- "Bye Bye Love" – 1:57

== Charts ==
Chart (1966–1967)	Peak position
US Hot Country Songs (Billboard)	5

== Accolades ==
Year	Nominee / work	Award	Result	Ref.
1968	10th Annual Grammy Awards	Best Country & Western Performance Duet, Trio or Group (Vocal or Instrumental)	Nominated	
