= I Cried All the Way to the Bank (song) =

Single by Norma Jean

from the album Pretty Miss Norma Jean
- B-side: "You Have to Be Out of Your Mind"
- Released: February 1965
- Genre: Country
- Length: 2:15
- Label: RCA Victor
- Songwriter: Liz Anderson
- Producer: Chet Atkins

Norma Jean singles chronology
"Go Cat Go" (1964)	"I Cried All the Way to the Bank" (1965)	"I Wouldn't Buy a Used Car from Him" (1965)

"I Cried All the Way to the Bank" is a song written by Liz Anderson that was originally recorded by American singer, Norma Jean. Released as a single in 1965, it made the top-40 on the US country songs chart that year, becoming one of several singles in her career to make a similar position.

== Background and recording ==
Norma Jean recorded a series of singles for the RCA Victor label that were considered "feisty" and "semi-comical", according to No Depression. Among these songs was "I Cried All the Way to the Bank". The song was composed by Liz Anderson and was produced by Chet Atkins.

== Release, critical reception and chart performance ==
"I Cried All the Way to the Bank" was released as a single by RCA Victor in February 1965 and was distributed as a seven-inch vinyl disc, featuring the B-side, "You Have to Be Out of Your Mind". It received a positive review from Billboard magazine, which called it a "winner" and called Liz Anderson's writing "special material". It debuted on the US Billboard Hot Country Songs chart on April 10, 1965 and spent eight weeks there, peaking at the number 21 position. It was the fourth release in Norma Jean's career to make the chart and fourth to make the top-40 as well. It was later included on her second studio album titled Pretty Miss Norma Jean (1965).

== Track listing ==
7" vinyl single

- "I Cried All the Way to the Bank" – 2:15
- "You Have to Be Out of Your Mind" – 2:00

== Charts ==
Chart (1965)	Peak position
US Hot Country Songs (Billboard)	21
