= Garcia Live Volume 23 =

Live album by the Jerry Garcia Band

Live album by Jerry Garcia Band
- Released: October 30, 2026
- Recorded: August 14, 1993
- Venue: Shoreline Amphitheatre
- Genres: Rock, rhythm and blues
- Length: 140:22
- Label: Round / ATO

Jerry Garcia Band chronology
Live at the Warfield (2025)	Garcia Live Volume 23 (2026)

Jerry Garcia chronology
Garcia Live Volume 22 (2026)	Garcia Live Volume 23 (2026)

Garcia Live Volume 23 is a two-CD live album by the Jerry Garcia Band. It contains the complete show recorded at Shoreline Amphitheatre in Mountain View, California on August 14, 1993. It was released on October 30, 2026.

The Shoreline concert was recorded on two-track digital audio tape. The opening act was the Neville Brothers.

The album features the Jerry Garcia Band's 1986 to 1993 lineup of Jerry Garcia on guitar and vocals, Melvin Seals on keyboards, John Kahn on bass, David Kemper on drums, and Jacklyn LaBranch and Gloria Jones on backing vocals.

== Critical reception ==
On jambands.com, Kristopher Weiss wrote, "At two hours, 20 minutes, this was a long show by Garcia Band standards and Garcia played many of the standards... Throughout the performance, Garcia experiments with atypical tones and makes his guitar ring extra-true by – paradoxically – placing it lower in the mix, so it’s more part of the pattern rather than the lone decoration..."

== Track listing ==
Disc 1

First set:

1. "How Sweet It Is (To Be Loved by You)" (Brian Holland, Eddie Holland, Lamont Dozier) – 7:34
2. "Forever Young" (Bob Dylan) – 9:16
3. "Struggling Man" (Jimmy Cliff) – 6:51
4. "Run for the Roses" (Jerry Garcia, Robert Hunter) – 5:50
5. "Money Honey" (Jesse Stone) – 6:51
6. "Like a Road Leading Home" (Dan Penn, Don Nix) – 8:53
7. "My Sisters and Brothers" (Charles Johnson) – 4:11
8. "Lay Down Sally" (Eric Clapton, Marcy Levy, George Terry) – 11:44

Disc 2

Second set:

1. "Shining Star" (Leo Graham, Paul Richmond) – 20:09
2. "You Never Can Tell (C'est La Vie)" (Chuck Berry) – 7:55
3. "Ain't No Bread in the Breadbox" (Norton Buffalo) – 8:09
4. "Wonderful World" (Lou Adler, Herb Alpert, Sam Cooke) – 4:27
5. "The Maker" (Daniel Lanois) – 7:48
6. "Don't Let Go" (Jesse Stone) – 13:41
7. "That Lucky Old Sun" (Beasley Smith, Haven Gillespie) – 10:33
8. "Midnight Moonlight" (Peter Rowan) – 6:19

== Personnel ==
Jerry Garcia Band

- Jerry Garcia – guitar, vocals
- Melvin Seals – keyboards
- John Kahn – bass
- David Kemper – drums
- Jaclyn LaBranch – backing vocals
- Gloria Jones – backing vocals

Production

- Produced for release by Marc Allan, Kevin Monty
- Recording: John Cutler
- Mastering: Fred Kevorkian
- Project coordination: Lauren Goetzinger, Daniel Romanoff
- Design, illustration: Chris Capotosto
- Liner notes essay: Dennis McNally
- Photos: Bob Andres, Joe Melena, Susana Millman, Tim Mosenfelder

== Charts ==
Chart performance for Garcia Live Volume 23
Chart (2026)	Peak position
US Top Album Sales (Billboard)	30
