= Garcia Live Volume 21 =

Live album by Jerry Garcia Band
- Released: June 14, 2024
- Recorded: February 13, 1976
- Venue: The Keystone
- Genre: Rock, rhythm and blues
- Length: 129:58
- Label: Round / ATO
- Producer: Marc Allan, Kevin Monty

Jerry Garcia Band chronology
Garcia Live Volume 20 (2023)	Garcia Live Volume 21 (2024)	Live at the Warfield (2025)

Jerry Garcia chronology
Live at Sonoma State – 11/4/73 (2023)	Garcia Live Volume 21 (2024)	Live at the Warfield (2025)

Garcia Live Volume 21 is a two-CD live album by the Jerry Garcia Band. It was recorded on February 13, 1976, at the Keystone in Berkeley, California. It contains most of the concert from that date, missing only the opening song, "How Sweet It Is". It also includes two bonus tracks from a show recorded two days later. It was released on June 14, 2024.

Garcia Live Volume 21 features the January 1976 to August 1977 lineup of the Jerry Garcia Band – Jerry Garcia on guitar and vocals, Keith Godchaux on keyboards, Donna Jean Godchaux on vocals, John Kahn on bass, and Ron Tutt on drums.

== Critical reception ==
On jambands.com, Larson Sutton wrote, "It's a mostly mellow show... Two songs pulled from a Palo Alto date two nights later serve as an "encore", filling out the winning two-disc set. All in all, this edition reignites a GarciaLive series that's been so adept at detailing the arc of Garcia's solo excursions."

== Track listing ==
Disc 1

First set:

1. "Catfish John" (Bob McDill, Allen Reynolds) – 14:13
2. "After Midnight" (J. J. Cale) – 13:17
3. "Mission in the Rain" (Jerry Garcia, Robert Hunter) – 6:57
4. "Who Was John?" (traditional) – 12:28
5. "They Love Each Other" (Jerry Garcia, Robert Hunter) – 7:31
6. "Moonlight Mile" (Mick Jagger, Keith Richards) – 10:27

Disc 2

Second set:

1. "The Harder They Come" (Jimmy Cliff) – 18:41
2. "Knockin' on Heaven's Door" (Bob Dylan) – 19:17
3. "Talkin' 'Bout You" (Ray Charles) – 10:33

Bonus tracks – February 15, 1976 – Sophie's, Palo Alto, California:

4. "How Sweet It Is (To Be Loved by You)" (Brian Holland, Eddie Holland, Lamont Dozier) – 9:29
5. "My Sisters and Brothers" (Charles Johnson) – 6:42

== Personnel ==
Jerry Garcia Band

- Jerry Garcia – guitar, vocals
- Donna Jean Godchaux – vocals
- Keith Godchaux – keyboards, vocals
- John Kahn – bass
- Ron Tutt – drums, vocals

Production

- Produced for release by Marc Allan and Kevin Monty
- Recording: Betty Cantor-Jackson
- Mastering: Fred Kevorkian
- Project coordination: Lauren Goetzinger, Daniel Romanoff
- Design, illustration: Chris Capotosto
- Liner notes essay: Ed Perlstein
- Photos: Greg Gaar, Ed Perlstein
