= Pursuing Happiness =

Single by Norma Jean

from the album The Game of Triangles
- B-side: "It Wasn't God Who Made Honky Tonk Angels"
- Released: July 1966
- Genre: Country
- Length: 2:27
- Label: RCA Victor
- Songwriter: Harlan Howard
- Producer: Bob Ferguson

Norma Jean singles chronology
"The Shirt" (1966)	"Pursuing Happiness" (1966)	"The Game of Triangles" (1966)

"Pursuing Happiness" is a song written by Harlan Howard that was originally recorded by American singer, Norma Jean. Released as a single by RCA Victor, it became a top-40 country song in 1966.

== Background, recording and content ==
Norma Jean had a series of top-40 country hits during the 1960s, along with being a regular cast member of The Porter Wagoner Show. Among these recordings was "Pursuing Happiness". The song was composed by Harlan Howard and was produced by Bob Ferguson.

== Release, critical reception and chart performance ==
"Pursuing Happiness" was released as a single by RCA Victor in July 1973 and was distributed as a seven-inch vinyl disc. It was backed on the B-side by a cover of "It Wasn't God Who Made Honky Tonk Angels". The single was given a positive review by Record World who wrote about the A-side and the B-side, writing that both "will click" with audiences. "Pursuing Happiness" entered the US Billboard Hot Country Songs chart on August 13, 1966. It spent 11 weeks there and reached the number 28 position, becoming her seventh top-40 song on the Hot Country Songs survey. It was included as a track on the studio albums The Game of Triangles and Jackson Ain't a Very Big Town.

== Track listing ==
7" vinyl single

- "Pursuing Happiness" – 2:27
- "It Wasn't God Who Made Honky Tonk Angels" – 2:21

== Charts ==
Chart (1966)	Peak position
US Hot Country Songs (Billboard)	28
