= The Shirt (song) =

Single by Norma Jean

from the album Please Don't Hurt Me
- B-side: "Please Don't Hurt Me"
- Released: March 1966
- Genre: Country
- Length: 3:00
- Label: RCA Victor
- Songwriters: Bill Anderson; Mel Strickland; George Bailey
- Producer: Bob Ferguson

Norma Jean singles chronology
"You're Driving Me Out of My Mind" (1965)	"The Shirt" (1966)	"Pursuing Happiness" (1966)

"The Shirt" is a song originally recorded by American singer, Norma Jean. Released as a single by RCA Victor, it became a top-40 charting record on the US Hot Country Songs chart in 1966.

== Background, recording and content ==
Norma Jean found success both as a cast member of The Porter Wagoner Show (preceding Dolly Parton) and as a country music artist in the 1960s who songs spoke about the working class. Among her charting singles from this era was 1966's "The Shirt", a spoken recitation about a woman who is remembering her deceased husband. It was composed by Bill Anderson, Mel Strickland and George Bailey while production was credited to Bob Ferguson.

== Release, critical reception and chart performance ==
"The Shirt" was released as a single by RCA Victor in March 1966 and included the B-side, "Please Don't Hurt Me". It was distributed as a seven-inch vinyl disc. Music writers David Cantwell and Charles L. Hughes of No Fences Review found it to be "maudlin as hell but also what many listeners heard, or would hear someday, as a story all too true". Billboard magazine predicted the song would make its country chart. This proved to be true when "The Shirt" debuted on the US Hot Country Songs chart on April 16, 1966. It spent eight weeks there, rising to the number 28 position by mid-1966. The single became Norma Jean's sixth top-40 US country song in her career and was among four top-40 songs she would have in 1966. It was later included as a track on her third studio album, Please Don't Hurt Me (1966).

== Track listing ==
7" vinyl single

- "The Shirt" – 3:00
- "Please Don't Hurt Me" – 2:21

== Charts ==
Chart (1966)	Peak position
US Hot Country Songs (Billboard)	28
