= Harvie June Van =

American singer-songwriter

- Born: March 2, 1940
- Origin: Monterey, Tennessee, United States
- Genres: Country, Hillbilly
- Occupation: Singer
- Instrument: Vocals
- Years active: 1956–1970

Harvie June Van (née Vanderpool; born March 2, 1940) is a retired country music singer. She was born in Monterey, Tennessee. She first broke into the music scene in 1954 when she was only 13 with the help of Syd Nathan of King Records. She came from a family of musicians, and her father had a local radio show in Ohio.

== Personal life ==
She married her manager Bob Ferguson, who would later become a RCA Records producer and executive. They would adopt two Native American children. Van would later divorce him. Today she lives in the Nashville area.

== Singles ==
- Can Can Skirt/My Sins Of Yesterday; single #1369 (1954)
- Lights Are Growing Dim/I'm Just Not That Kind; single #1387 (1955)
- Mama Don't Chase My Love Away/Don't Offer Me The Stars; single #1482 (1955)
- False Or True/I Found Out (King #1497, 1955)
- Natividad/Dasher (Briar #45-121, 1961)
- Johnny Darling/Little Wooden Man
- The Butcher Boy/Leaving Woman Blues (1959)
- When You Are Here/Wildwood Flower; RCA Victor #7668 (1959) Written by Bob Ferguson, Produced by Chet Atkins
- Natividad/Dasher (re-release, 1967)
