= Let's Go All the Way (Norma Jean album) =

Studio album by Norma Jean
- Released: November 1964
- Studio: Nashville Sound Studio
- Genre: Country
- Label: RCA Victor
- Producers: Chet Atkins; Bob Ferguson

Norma Jean chronology
Let's Go All the Way (1964)	Pretty Miss Norma Jean (1965)

Singles from Let's Go All the Way
- 1. "Let's Go All the Way" Released: November 1963; 2. "I'm a Walkin' Advertisement (For the Blues)"/"Put Your Arms Around Her" Released: April 1964

Let's Go All the Way is a studio album by American singer, Norma Jean. It was released in November 1964 by RCA Victor and was her debut studio album. The 12-track collection of country music included the title track, which was also her first commercial success in the genre, reaching the top-20 on the US country songs chart. The album was given a positive review by Billboard following its release.

== Background, recording and content ==
Norma Jean rose to country music stardom after becoming a cast member of The Porter Wagoner Show in the 1960s. With the help of Porter Wagoner, she gained a recording contract with RCA Victor and had her first commercial success with the song "Let's Go All the Way". Her debut album of the same name followed in 1964. According to the liner notes, Let's Go All the Way was recorded at RCA's "Nashville Sound Studio", which was also located in Nashville, Tennessee. The album's production was credited to Chet Atkins and Bob Ferguson and consisted of 12 tracks in total.

== Release, critical reception and singles ==
Let's Go All the Way was released in November 1964 and was part of 22 albums released by the RCA Victor label that month. It was offered originally as a vinyl LP in either monaural or stereo formats. Billboard magazine reviewed the LP and praised it, commenting, "The thrush has a fine country sound-which is showcased by a set of very fine arrangements." AllMusic gave it 4.5 out of 5 stars but did not provide a written review. Two singles were included on Let's Go All the Way, beginning with the title track, which was first released by RCA in November 1963. The song rose to number 11 on the US Billboard Hot Country Songs chart, becoming her first charting single there. The album's second single was "Put Your Arms Around Her" (backed on the B-side by "I'm a Walkin' Advertisement for the Blues"). Both the A-side and B-side made the US Hot Country Songs chart, with the A-side peaking at number 32 while the B-side reached number 25.

== Track listing ==
Side one
No.	Title	Writer(s)	Length
1.	"Memories from the Past"	George and Charles McCormick	2:36
2.	"It's a Little More Like Heaven"	Hoyt Johnson; Jim Atkins	2:08
3.	"Unloved, Unwanted"	Wayne Walker; Irene Stanton	2:38
4.	"One Way Ticket to the Blues"	Jimmy Dallas	2:35
5.	"Let's Go All the Way"	Dusty Rose	2:44
6.	"Put Your Arms Around Her"	Bob Morris	2:07

Side two
No.	Title	Writer(s)	Length
1.	"Lonesome Number One"	Don Gibson	2:18
2.	"I Don't Love You Anymore"	Bill Anderson	2:25
3.	"I'm a Walkin' Advertisement (For the Blues)"	Cy Coben	2:28
4.	"My Baby's Not Here (In Town Tonight)"	Charles Beam; Charles Jiles; W. S. Stevenson	2:25
5.	"I Thought I Heard You Calling My Name"	Lee Emerson	2:33
6.	"Why?"	Dave Burgess	2:39

== Release history ==
Release history and formats for Let's Go All the Way
Region	Date	Format	Label	Ref.
Various	November 1964	Vinyl LP (mono); vinyl LP (stereo)	RCA Victor	
Various	Circa 1969	8-track cartridge	RCA	
Various	Circa 2020	Music download; streaming	Sony Music Entertainment	
