= Norma Jean Sings a Tribute to Kitty Wells =

Studio album by Norma Jean
- Released: November 1966
- Studio: Nashville Sound Studio
- Genre: Country
- Label: RCA Victor
- Producer: Bob Ferguson

Norma Jean chronology
Please Don't Hurt Me (1966)	Norma Jean Sings a Tribute to Kitty Wells (1966)	The Game of Triangles (1967)

Norma Jean Sings a Tribute to Kitty Wells is a studio album by American singer, Norma Jean. It was released in November 1966 by RCA Victor and was her fourth studio album. It paid tribute to Norma Jean's biggest musical influence, country music singer Kitty Wells. It consisted of her singing her own version of Wells's most popular songs. It received a positive reception from music publications after its release.

== Background, recording and content ==
A regular cast member of The Porter Wagoner Show in the 1960s, Norma Jean also had a solo career with several top-10 and top-40 US country hits during the decade. From childhood, she was largely inspired to pursue a career in country music after hearing Kitty Wells on the radio. In honor of her musical influence, she recorded a tribute album to Wells after finding commercial success. The collection consisted of 12 songs all of which were recorded and made popular by Wells. This included the popular "It Wasn't God Who Made Honky Tonk Angels" and the more recent Wells hit, "Meanwhile Down at Joe's".

== Release, critical reception and chart performance ==
Norma Jean Sings a Tribute to Kitty Wells was released by RCA Victor in November 1966 and was her fourth studio offering. It was distributed as a vinyl LP in either monaural or stereo formats. It received positive reviews from music publications following its release. Billboard praised Norma Jean for adapting Wells's material to fit her own style and believed the product would "chalk big sales". Cash Box also thought the album would be "a steady seller" for its tribute to Wells since both were members of the Grand Ole Opry at the time. AllMusic did not write a written review but rated it four out of five stars. The product peaked at number 23 on the US Billboard Top Country Albums survey in early 1967 and was her third album to make the sales chart in her career. It was also her lowest-peaking album on the chart at that point in her career.

== Track listing ==
Side one
No.	Title	Writer(s)	Length
1.	"It Wasn't God Who Made Honky Tonk Angels"	J. D. Miller	2:21
2.	"Amigo's Guitar"	Roy Bodkin; John D. Loudermilk; Kitty Wells	2:32
3.	"I Heard the Jukebox Playing"	Baggett; Pierce; Wells	2:33
4.	"Three Ways (To Love You)"	E. Jay; J. Dixon	2:27
5.	"Searching (For Someone Like You)"	Murphy M. Maddux, Jr.	2:08
6.	"Mommy for a Day"	Harlan Howard; Buck Owens	2:11

Side two
No.	Title	Writer(s)	Length
1.	"Meanwhile, Down at Joe's"	Howard	2:23
2.	"Making Believe"	Jimmy Work	2:34
3.	"I'll Repossess My Heart"	Paul Yandell	1:52
4.	"You Don't Hear"	Tom Cash; Jerry Huffman	2:10
5.	"Heartbreak U.S.A."	Howard	2:15
6.	"I Don't Claim to Be an Angel"	Johnnie Wright; Jack Anglin	2:31

== Charts ==
Chart (1966–1967)	Peak position
US Top Country Albums (Billboard)	23

== Release history ==
Release history and formats for Norma Jean Sings a Tribute to Kitty Wells
Region	Date	Format	Label	Ref.
Various	November 1966	Vinyl LP (mono); vinyl LP (stereo)	RCA Victor	
