= Garcia Live Volume 20 =

Live album by Jerry Garcia Band
- Released: June 30, 2023
- Recorded: June 18, 1982
- Venue: Cape Cod Coliseum
- Genre: Rock, rhythm and blues
- Length: 135:29
- Label: Round / ATO
- Producer: Marc Allan, Kevin Monty

Jerry Garcia Band chronology
Garcia Live Volume 19 (2022)	Garcia Live Volume 20 (2023)	Garcia Live Volume 21 (2024)

Jerry Garcia chronology
Garcia Live Volume 19 (2022)	Garcia Live Volume 20 (2023)	Live at Sonoma State – 11/4/73 (2023)

Garcia Live Volume 20 is a two-CD live album by the Jerry Garcia Band. It contains the complete concert recorded on June 18, 1982, at the Cape Cod Coliseum in South Yarmouth, Massachusetts. It also includes bonus tracks recorded on June 1, 1981, at The Stone in San Francisco. It was released on June 30, 2023.

At the June 18, 1982 show, the Jerry Garcia Band shared the bill with Bobby and the Midnites. According to the album liner notes, Bob Weir, Bobby Cochran, and Billy Cobham sat in on the song "They Love Each Other", but due to a technical issue they can not be heard on the recording.

== Critical reception ==
Glide Magazine wrote, "As... Blair Jackson points out in his liner notes... the JGB was an ever-evolving cast of characters. Yet even in its constantly-altered forms, all those involved invariably sang and played as all the participants do here, that is, with all the urgency and commitment of the group's namesake. No one is in a hurry, however, anywhere on the complete, previously unreleased performance in the Bay State's vacationland."

== Track listing ==
Disc 1

June 18, 1982 – Cape Cod Coliseum:

1. "How Sweet It Is (To Be Loved by You)" (Brian Holland, Eddie Holland, Lamont Dozier) – 10:05
2. "Valerie" (Jerry Garcia, Robert Hunter) – 7:05
3. "Dear Prudence" (John Lennon, Paul McCartney) – 13:56
4. "Mississippi Moon" (Peter Rowan) – 9:58
5. "Don't Let Go" (Jesse Stone) – 19:03
6. "Simple Twist of Fate" (Bob Dylan) – 12:19

Disc 2

June 18, 1982 – Cape Cod Coliseum, continued:

1. "Run for the Roses" (Garcia, Hunter) – 6:47
2. "They Love Each Other" (Garcia, Hunter) – 7:07

Bonus tracks – June 1, 1981 – The Stone:

3. "Sitting in Limbo" (Guilly Bright, Jimmy Cliff) – 12:56
4. "After Midnight" (J. J. Cale) – 16:35
5. "Deal" (Garcia, Hunter) – 8:23
6. "Tangled Up in Blue" (Dylan) – 11:11

== Personnel ==
Jerry Garcia Band

- Jerry Garcia – guitar, vocals
- Melvin Seals – organ
- Jimmy Warren – electric piano
- John Kahn – bass
- Bill Kreutzmann – drums (June 18, 1982)
- Liz Stires – vocals (June 18, 1982)
- Julie Stafford – vocals (June 18, 1982)
- Daoud Shaw – drums (June 1, 1981)

Production

- Produced and curated by Marc Allan, Kevin Monty
- Recording: John Cutler
- Mastering: Fred Kevorkian
- Project coordination: Lauren Goetzinger, Daniel Romanoff
- Design, illustration: Christopher Capotosto
- Liner notes essay: Blair Jackson
- Photos: T. Kennelly, Bob Minkin Photography, Michael Ochs Archives, Howie Roemer
