= Garcia Live Volume 19 =

Live album by Jerry Garcia Band
- Released: October 28, 2022
- Recorded: October 31, 1992
- Venue: Oakland Arena
- Genre: Rock, rhythm and blues
- Length: 132:45
- Label: Round / ATO
- Producer: Marc Allan; Kevin Monty

Jerry Garcia Band chronology
Garcia Live Volume 17 (2021)	Garcia Live Volume 19 (2022)	Garcia Live Volume 20 (2023)

Jerry Garcia chronology
Garcia Live Volume 18 (2022)	Garcia Live Volume 19 (2022)	Garcia Live Volume 20 (2023)

Garcia Live Volume 19 is a two-CD live album by the Jerry Garcia Band. It contains the complete concert recorded on October 31, 1992 at the Oakland Coliseum Arena. It was released on October 28, 2022.

In August 1992 Jerry Garcia, who at the time was in generally poor health, fell ill. The Grateful Dead cancelled a number of concerts planned for late summer and early fall while Garcia began his recovery and pursued a healthier lifestyle. The Halloween show by the Jerry Garcia Band was his first live performance after these events.

The opening act at this concert was Vince Welnick's band the Affordables.

Two tracks from this recording were previously released. "Ain't No Bread in the Breadbox" is on the album Shining Star, and "Tangled Up in Blue" is on the album Garcia Plays Dylan.

== Critical reception ==
On jambands.com Larson Sutton said, "... the nine songs tend to cruise at similar altitudes, with Jerry's relatively paced and relaxed guitar work and Melvin Seals' flash of keyboards finding their peaks. Garcia’s voice is of fine vintage the entire evening... The highlight of the second half – and possibly the show – is on its set starter, "Shining Star". Performed with gentle hands and effortless restraint, the soulful cover of the Manhattans' classic falls like leaves of orange and red from the weathering trees, wafting down and landing with a whisper."

In Glide Magazine Doug Collete wrote, "... this release in the longstanding archive series is an object lesson in how great artists speak to their audiences, explicitly and implicitly, through their choice of material as much as the way they play it.... The sonics capture a band playing with agile snap and consistent authority right from the start... Meanwhile, Garcia's own vocal delivery likewise gains incremental force as the show unfolds."

== Track listing ==
Disc 1

First set:

1. "How Sweet It Is (To Be Loved by You)" (Brian Holland, Eddie Holland, Lamont Dozier) – 7:18
2. "Stop That Train" (Peter Tosh) – 7:31
3. "The Maker" (Daniel Lanois) – 7:11
4. "You Never Can Tell (C'est La Vie)" (Chuck Berry) – 7:45
5. "The Night They Drove Old Dixie Down" (Robbie Robertson) – 9:22
6. "Lay Down Sally" (Eric Clapton, Marcy Levy, George Terry) – 7:23
7. "Deal" (Jerry Garcia, Robert Hunter) – 7:39

Disc 2

Second set:

1. "Shining Star" (Paul Richmond, Leo Graham) – 12:33
2. "And It Stoned Me" (Van Morrison) – 7:36
3. "Ain't No Bread in the Breadbox" (Norton Buffalo) – 10:30
4. "What a Wonderful World" (George Weiss, Bob Thiele) – 8:19
5. "Tore Up Over You" (Hank Ballard) – 8:17
6. "Waiting for a Miracle" (Bruce Cockburn) – 6:02
7. "My Sisters and Brothers" (Charles Johnson) – 6:01
8. "Tangled Up in Blue" (Bob Dylan) – 11:48

Encore:

9. "Werewolves of London" (LeRoy Marinell, Waddy Wachtel, Warren Zevon) – 7:14

== Personnel ==
Jerry Garcia Band

- Jerry Garcia – guitar, vocals
- Melvin Seals – keyboards
- John Kahn – bass
- David Kemper – drums
- Jaclyn LaBranch – backing vocals
- Gloria Jones – backing vocals

Production

- Produced for release by Marc Allan, Kevin Monty
- Recording: John Cutler
- Mastering: Fred Kevorkian
- Liner notes essay: Joe Jupille
- Photos: Susana Millman
- Front cover artwork: Jerry Garcia
