= Liz Anderson Sings Her Favorites =

Studio album by Liz Anderson
- Released: 1968
- Recorded: 1968
- Genre: Country, Nashville sound
- Label: RCA Victor
- Producer: Felton Jarvis

Liz Anderson chronology
Cookin' up Hits (1968)	Liz Anderson Sings Her Favorites (1968)	Like a Merry-Go Round (1969)

Liz Anderson Sings Her Favorites is the fourth studio album by Liz Anderson. Released in 1968, the disc became Anderson's most successful album on the Billboard Hot Country LPS chart, peaking at number 16 although the album's only single release "Thanks A Lot for Tryin' Anyway" only reached number 40 in the country top 40. The album was a cover album of recent country songs, hits and obscure songs, that were personal favorites of Anderson's. The album was released as a music download March 14, 2017 by Sony Legacy.

== Track listing ==
1. "Ode to Billie Joe" (Bobbie Gentry)
2. "I'd Be More of a Woman" (Tommy Collins)
3. "Apartment Number 9" (Fern Foley, Fuzzy Owen, Johnny Paycheck)
4. "Dumb Blonde" (Curly Putman)
5. "Lay Some Happiness on Me" (Bob Jennings, Jean Chapel)
6. "What Locks the Door" (Vic McAlpin)
7. "Thanks a Lot for Trying Anyway" (Jim Glaser)
8. "I Washed My Face in the Morning Dew" (Tom T. Hall)
9. "Your Tender Loving Care" (Buck Owens)
10. "Get While the Gettin's Good" (Bill Anderson (singer))
11. "Somewhere Between" (Merle Haggard)
12. "Something Called Happiness" (Donna Austin)

== Chart positions ==
Chart (1968)	Peak position
Billboard Country Albums	16
