= Liz Anderson Sings =

Studio album by Liz Anderson
- Released: 1967
- Recorded: 1966
- Genre: Country, Nashville Sound
- Label: RCA Victor

Liz Anderson chronology
The Game of Triangles (1967)	Liz Anderson Sings (1967)	Cookin' up Hits (1967)

Singles from Liz Anderson Sings
- 1. "Mama Spank" Released: November 1966

Liz Anderson Sings is the third studio album by Liz Anderson and her first solo album on RCA Victor. Anderson wrote all of the songs except those noted. The album was released as a music download on November 10, 2017 by Sony Legacy.

== Track listing ==
All tracks composed by Liz Anderson; except where indicated

1. "No One Will Ever Know" (Fred Rose, Mel Foree)
2. "Walk Out Backwards" (Bill Anderson)
3. "So Much for Me So Much for You"
4. "Tippy Toeing" (Bobby Harden)
5. "Hundred Times Today"
6. "Be Quiet Mind"
7. "To the Landlord"
8. "I've Cried the Rain Down" (Lynn Anderson)
9. "Mama Spank"
10. "How to Break Up (Without Really Crying)"
11. "Release Me" (Eddie Miller, W.S. Stevenson, Dub Williams, Robert Yount)

== Chart positions ==
Chart (1968)	Peak position
Billboard Country Albums	20
