= Cookin' Up Hits =

Cookin' up Hits

Studio album by Liz Anderson
- Released: 1967
- Recorded: 1967
- Genre: Country, Nashville Sound
- Label: RCA Victor
- Producer: Felton Jarvis

Liz Anderson chronology
Liz Anderson Sings (1967)	Cookin' up Hits (1967)	Liz Anderson Sings Her Favorites (1968)

Cookin' up Hits is the fourth studio album by Liz Anderson. All twelve songs were written by Anderson ("I'm a Lonesome Fugitive" was cowritten by her husband Casey) and included her performances of two songs that were the debut hits for her daughter Lynn Anderson, "Ride Ride, Ride" and "If I Kiss You". The album peaked at #18 on the Billboard country LP chart and the lone single release, "Tiny Tears" was a #24 top 40 country hit for Liz. The album was released as a music download October 13, 2017 by Sony Legacy.

== Track listing ==
All tracks composed by Liz Anderson; except where indicated

1. "Never Ever" (Liz Anderson, Donna Austin)
2. "Tiny Tears"
3. "I'm a Lonesome Fugitive" (Liz Anderson, Casey Anderson)
4. "On Your Way To Gone"
5. "The Spirit Of Christmas"
6. "Ride Ride Ride"
7. "The Chiseler"
8. "Come Walk In My Shoes"
9. "If I Kiss You (Will You Go Away)"
10. "Never Is A Long Long Day"
11. "Behind My Back"

== Chart positions ==
Year	Chart	Position
1968	Billboard Country Albums	18
