= Live at the Warfield (Jerry Garcia Band album) =

Live album by Jerry Garcia Band
- Released: August 15, 2025
- Recorded: February 28 – March 2, 1991
- Venues: Warfield Theatre, San Francisco
- Genres: Rock, rhythm and blues
- Length: 406:17
- Label: Round / ATO
- Producers: Marc Allan, Kevin Monty

Jerry Garcia Band chronology
Garcia Live Volume 21 (2024)	Live at the Warfield (2025)	Garcia Live Volume 23 (2026)

Jerry Garcia chronology
Garcia Live Volume 21 (2024)	Live at the Warfield (2025)	Garcia Live Volume 22 (2026)

Live at the Warfield is a six-CD live album by the Jerry Garcia Band. It contains recordings of three complete concerts performed on February 28, March 1, and March 2, 1991, at the Warfield Theatre in San Francisco. It was released on August 15, 2025.

Each of the three concerts was also released separately on vinyl – February 28, 1991 (four LPs) on August 15, 2025; March 1, 1991 (four LPs) on October 3, 2025; and March 2, 1991 (five LPs) on December 5, 2025.

These shows featured the Jerry Garcia Band's 1986 to 1993 lineup of Jerry Garcia on guitar and vocals, Melvin Seals on keyboards, John Kahn on bass, David Kemper on drums, and Jacklyn LaBranch and Gloria Jones on backing vocals.

== Critical reception ==
On jambands.com, Larson Sutton wrote, "As the JGB lineup solidified alongside the repertoire, the sextet rose to its potential as an equally reliable, smoking ensemble. No question, this six-CD collection documenting a three-show run at the famed Warfield in the winter of 1991 had the heater on high.... And, with Garcia and his group approaching most of the tunes with a jazzer's mentality – establishing the song, then launching into journeys of improvisation – every moment is of discovery, despite how engrained some of the songs had become."

In Glide Magazine, Doug Collette said, "It is a special pleasure indeed to hear the titular leader of the Grateful Dead in friendly confines such as this vaunted San Francisco venue. But as the ever erudite (and passionate) Blair Jackson writes in his liner notes, Garcia and company's history lent itself to those rare moments of inspired intimacy that populated these three nights and six sets of music."

== Track listing ==
Disc 1

February 28, 1991 – first set:

1. "The Way You Do the Things You Do" (Smokey Robinson, Bobby Rogers) – 11:15
2. "Mission in the Rain" (Jerry Garcia, Robert Hunter) – 9:24
3. "You Never Can Tell (C'est La Vie)" (Chuck Berry) – 7:27
4. "Simple Twist of Fate" (Bob Dylan) – 11:09
5. "I Second That Emotion" (Al Cleveland, Robinson) – 9:44
6. "Like a Road Leading Home" (Don Nix, Dan Penn) – 8:23
7. "My Sisters and Brothers" (Charles Johnson) – 4:06
8. "Deal" (Garcia, Hunter) – 9:13

Disc 2

February 28, 1991 – second set:

1. "Everybody Needs Somebody to Love" (Bert Berns, Solomon Burke, Jerry Wexler) – 11:31
2. "Stop That Train" (Peter Tosh) – 7:44
3. "Waiting for a Miracle" (Bruce Cockburn) – 7:41
4. "Think" (Jimmy McCracklin, Don Robey) – 7:03
5. "Lay Down Sally" (Eric Clapton, Marcy Levy, George Terry) – 8:26
6. "That Lucky Old Sun" (Haven Gillespie, Beasley Smith) – 10:49
7. "Midnight Moonlight" (Peter Rowan) – 6:08

Disc 3

March 1, 1991 – first set:

1. Tuning / "Hold Your Head Up" (Rod Argent, Chris White) – 1:51
2. "Cats Under the Stars" (Garcia, Hunter) – 9:55
3. "He Ain't Give You None" (Van Morrison) – 8:46
4. "Struggling Man" (Jimmy Cliff) – 8:26
5. "Forever Young" (Dylan) – 8:46
6. "Run for the Roses" (Garcia, Hunter) – 5:28
7. "The Night They Drove Old Dixie Down" (Robbie Robertson) – 8:44
8. "Lay Down Sally" (Clapton, Levy, Terry) – 9:39

Disc 4

March 1, 1991 – second set:

1. "The Harder They Come" (Cliff) – 11:31
2. "Money Honey" (Jesse Stone) – 7:25
3. "And It Stoned Me" (Morrison) – 8:03
4. "Russian Lullaby" (Irving Berlin) – 12:04
5. "Don't Let Go" (Stone) – 20:31
6. "Positively 4th Street" (Dylan) – 8:47
7. "Everybody Needs Somebody to Love" (Berns, Burke, Wexler) – 8:48

Disc 5

March 2, 1991 – first set:

1. "How Sweet It Is (To Be Loved by You)" (Brian Holland, Eddie Holland, Lamont Dozier) – 7:52
2. "I Shall Be Released" (Dylan) – 11:22
3. "You Never Can Tell (C'est La Vie)" (Berry) – 7:53
4. "Mississippi Moon" (Rowan) – 8:45
5. "Tore Up over You" (Hank Ballard) – 7:47
6. "My Sisters and Brothers" (Johnson) – 5:00
7. "Let's Spend the Night Together" (Mick Jagger, Keith Richards) – 13:13

Disc 6

March 2, 1991 – second set:

1. "The Way You Do the Things You Do" (Robinson, Rogers) – 13:22
2. "Señor (Tales of Yankee Power)" (Dylan) – 7:34
3. "Struggling Man" (Cliff) – 7:58
4. "Money Honey" (Stone) – 6:59
5. "Everybody Needs Somebody to Love" (Berns, Burke, Wexler) – 10:37
6. "Evangeline" (David Hidalgo, Louie Pérez) – 5:31
7. "That Lucky Old Sun" (Gillespie, Smith) – 10:30
8. "Tangled Up in Blue" (Dylan) – 13:41

== Personnel ==
Jerry Garcia Band

- Jerry Garcia – guitar, vocals
- Melvin Seals – keyboards
- John Kahn – bass
- David Kemper – drums
- Jacklyn LaBranch – vocals
- Gloria Jones – vocals

Production

- Original recordings produced by Jerry Garcia
- Produced for release and curated by Marc Allan and Kevin Monty
- Recording: John Cutler
- Mastering: Fred Kevorkian
- Project coordination: Lauren Goetzinger, Daniel Romanoff
- Illustration: Evan M. Cohen
- Layout: D. Norsen
- Liner notes essay: Blair Jackson
