= I'm a Walkin' Advertisement (For the Blues) =

"I'm a Walkin' Advertisment (For the Blues)"

Single by Norma Jean

from the album Let's Go All the Way
- B-side: "Put Your Arms Around Her"
- Released: April 1964
- Genre: Country
- Length: 2:28
- Label: RCA Victor
- Songwriter: Cy Coben
- Producer: Chet Atkins

Norma Jean singles chronology
"Let's Go All the Way" (1963)	"I'm a Walkin' Advertisment (For the Blues)" (1964)	"Go Cat Go" (1964)

"I'm a Walkin' Advertisement (For the Blues)" is a song written by Cy Coben that was originally recorded by American singer, Norma Jean. Released as a single in 1964, it made the top-40 on the US country songs chart and received positive reviews from publications.

== Background, recording and content ==
Norma Jean found success in the country genre with a series of "hard-edged" material in the 1960s while also being Porter Wagoner's musical partner. After signing with RCA Victor, she had a top-15 country song with "Let's Go All the Way". "I'm a Walkin' Advertisement (For the Blues)" immediately followed it as a single. The song was composed by Cy Coben and was produced by Chet Atkins.

== Release, critical reception and chart performance ==
"I'm a Walkin' Advertisement (For the Blues)" was released as a single by RCA Victor in April 1964 as a seven-inch vinyl disc, featuring a B-side titled "Put Your Arms Around Her". Billboard did not write a written review but named the song one of its "Programming Specials" in May 1964. Cash Box named it among its "bullseye" picks, which meant the song was among the publication's top picks for that week. The magazine praised both the A-side and B-side as "two tear-compelling efforts" that could both be successful. This proved true after both the A-side and the B-side made the country charts. Specifically, "I'm a Walkin' Advertisement" debuted on the US Billboard Hot Country Songs chart on May 30, 1964. It spent a total of 11 weeks on the chart, climbing to the number 32 position. It became Norma Jean's second charting Billboard single in her career. It later appeared on her debut studio album titled Let's Go All the Way.

== Track listing ==
7" vinyl single

- "I'm a Walkin' Advertisment (For the Blues)" – 2:28
- "Put Your Arms Around Her" – 2:07

== Charts ==
Chart (1964)	Peak position
US Hot Country Songs (Billboard)	32
