= Larry Hulst =

American rock-and-roll concert photographer

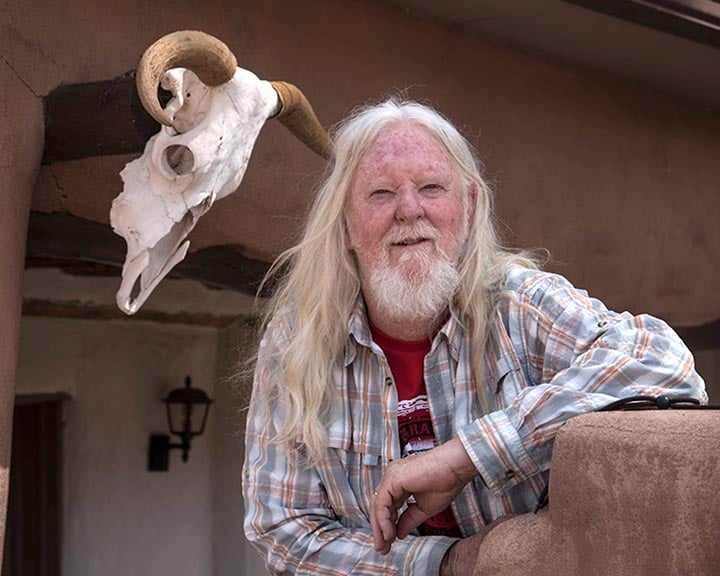
- Larry Hulst in Colorado Springs, Colorado
- Born: 1946 (age 79–80); San Diego, California, U.S.
- Occupations: Photographer, photojournalist
- Years active: 1969–present
- Known for: Concert photography
- Website: www.larryhulst.com

Larry Hulst (born 1946) is an American concert photographer known for black-and-white images of rock, blues, and soul performers from the late 1960s onward. Museums and arts organizations have presented traveling exhibitions of his work, including Front Row Center: Icons of Rock, Blues, and Soul (organized by International Arts & Artists and shown at institutions such as the Colorado Springs Fine Arts Center at Colorado College in 2017 and The Momentary in 2025).

== Early life and career ==
Hulst was born in 1946 in San Diego, California. He served 27 years as a government photographer and photojournalist, working on rock and blues photography at night. After military service, he began photographing concerts in 1969; his first show was the Steve Miller Band at The Fillmore in San Francisco. He went on to shoot thousands of performances across the United States through the 1970s–1990s, focusing on on-stage perspectives and crowd atmosphere.

== Work and subjects ==
Institutional exhibition texts note that Hulst's archive covers major artists from Janis Joplin and Jimi Hendrix to David Bowie and Lauryn Hill, and members of the Grateful Dead with images dating chiefly from 1970 to 1999. Hulst has amassed a collection of over 100,000 black-and-white negatives of touring and recording artists.

One of his most notable photographs is a group shot of Robert Cray, Eric Clapton, Stevie Ray Vaughan, and Jimmie Vaughan, taken shortly before Stevie Ray Vaughan's final performance in 1990. Coverage in regional media has described him as a longtime Colorado Springs–based photographer with a career spanning five decades.

== Exhibitions ==
- Larry Hulst: Front Row Center — Colorado Springs Fine Arts Center at Colorado College, February 18–May 21, 2017.
- Front Row Center: Icons of Rock, Blues & Soul (traveling) — organized by International Arts & Artists; shown at multiple venues, including Springfield Museums (2022), Biggs Museum of American Art (2023), and The Momentary (2025).

== Publications and licensing ==
Hulst's photographs have appeared in magazines including Rolling Stone, Guitar Player, and Time, and editorial and commercial agencies have distributed his images.
