= Norma Jean (singer) =

American country music singer

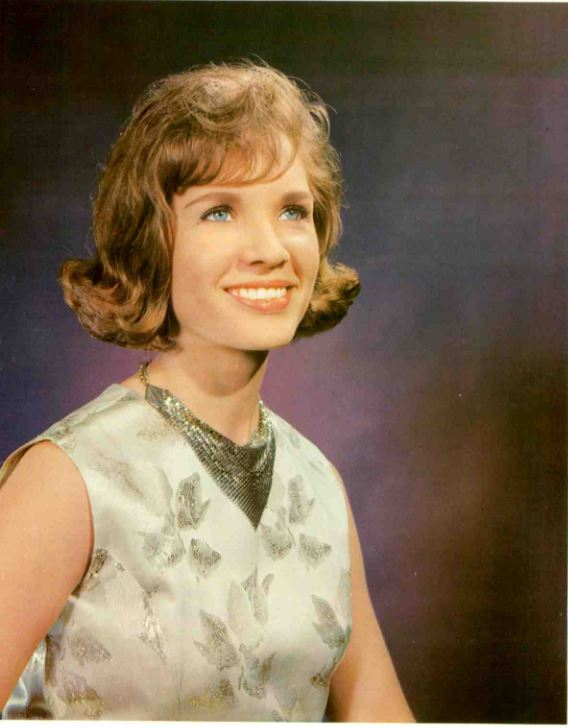
- Norma Jean in 1966
- Born: Norma Jean Beasler; January 30, 1938 (age 88); Wellston, Oklahoma, US
- Occupation: Singer
- Years active: 1955–present
- Works: Discography
- Spouses: 4, including: Jody Taylor (divorced); George Riddle (divorced); Al Martin (circa 1990s)
- Children: 3
- Musical career
- Origin: Nashville, Tennessee, US
- Genres: Country; gospel
- Instruments: Vocals; guitar
- Labels: Columbia; RCA Victor; Roma; Heart of Texas

Norma Jean Beasler (born January 30, 1938), known professionally as Norma Jean, is an American singer who found popularity in the country music genre. She was also known for her collaboration with Porter Wagoner (preceding Dolly Parton) on his television program and touring shows during the 1960s. Her solo recordings also became commercially successful and discussed themes about the working class and women's independence.

Raised in Oklahoma, Norma Jean got her start performing on local radio. With the help of childhood friend and future singer, Wanda Jackson, she became a cast member of the Ozark Jubilee television show in 1955. She also met Wagoner on the show, who made her a cast member of his newly-created television program in 1960. Her popularity with Wagoner's show led to a recording contract with RCA Victor. The label issued a series of singles during the 1960s that made the US country songs chart, including the top-20 "Let's Go All the Way" and the top-10 single "Go Cat Go". RCA also released a series of studio albums of Norma Jean's material during the 1960s, most of which made the US country albums chart. She also became a regular member of the Grand Ole Opry during the decade.

Norma Jean left Wagoner's show in 1967 but continued recording for RCA through 1973, releasing about a dozen more albums with the label. She later left the cast of the Grand Ole Opry and went into a period of semi-retirement in Oklahoma during the second half of the 1970s. She married and divorced three times during this period as well. In 1983, she returned to country music industry where she released an album that was sold on television. Norma Jean also became more religious and began performing gospel music later in life. In 2005, her first album of new material in several decades was released called The Loneliest Star in Texas. Her most recent album was issued in 2014 and titled Aged to Perfection. She was later inducted into Oklahoma Music Hall of Fame in 2013.

== Early life ==
Norma Jean Beasler was born on January 30, 1938 in a farmhouse located near Wellston, Oklahoma. Beasler grew up in a rural environment with limited money or resources. "We never had many treats or toys, but I was never without love," she remembered. Beasler became interested in country music from a young age. She often listened to the Grand Ole Opry and traded in a bicycle to buy a guitar from Sears and Roebuck. Her family moved to Oklahoma City in the mid-1940s where Beasler later landed her own radio show. She performed on the air for the first time singing "If Teardrops Were Pennies" on Oklahoma City's KLPR at age 12.

Beasler began performing in her teens with western swing bands and was often left unaccompanied while working gigs. At the same time, she attended Capitol Hill High School in Oklahoma City where she befriended future singer, Wanda Jackson. The pair have since remained life-long friends. With the help of Jackson (who had found success in the country genre by this point), she got a regular spot on the ABC-TV show in 1955 called the Ozark Jubilee, in Springfield, Missouri. Beasler stayed with the program for two years and it was her first performing exposure to a national audience. Host Red Foley suggested calling her simply Norma Jean, and she made it official in 1958.

== Career ==
=== 1959–1966: Rise to fame, The Porter Wagoner Show and breakthrough ===
In 1959, Marty Robbins helped get her a recording contract with Columbia Records, however none of her recordings became successful. Her first Columbia release was 1959's "Honolulu Queen", which featured a Hawaiian-styled arrangement and was given a B+ rating by Cash Box magazine.

While on the Ozark Jubilee, she had met Porter Wagoner who auditioned her for his television program, The Porter Wagoner Show. She subsequently joined the cast and appeared on his touring shows beginning in 1960. Wagoner then gave her the title of "Pretty Miss Norma Jean", a name she was referred to throughout her career. Norma Jean then appeared on Wagoner's 1963 live album (also called The Porter Wagoner Show) and the 1964 live album (Porter Wagoner in Person Recorded Live). Her popularity on the program led to producer Chet Atkins taking notice and signing her to a contract with RCA Victor.

According to Norma Jean, Wagoner chose the majority of material she recorded, including her debut RCA single titled "Let's Go All the Way". Released in 1963, "Let's Go All the Way" became her first commercial success, reaching number 11 on the US country songs chart. Its follow-up, "I'm a Walkin' Advertisement (For the Blues)", made the US country top-40 in 1964. Both singles were then included on Norma Jean's debut album, also called Let's Go All the Way (1964). The same year, the song "Go Cat Go" became her first top-10 country single, reaching number eight. In 1965, "I Wouldn't Buy a Used Car from Him" became her second single to make the US country top-10. The latter recording and its follow-up release ("I Cried All the Way to the Bank") were included on the 1965 LP, Pretty Miss Norma Jean, which rose to number three on the US country albums chart. She also joined the cast of the Grand Ole Opry in 1965.

Norma Jean continued having commercial success in the country genre as the decade progressed. The lyrical themes within her music reflected working class hardships and failed romantic relationships which were referred to by critics as both "comical" and "plainspoken". Among them was her most commercially-successful song, "The Game of Triangles" (1966), which described a love triangle that included Bobby Bare and Liz Anderson, and climbed into the US country top-five. Three additional solo singles with similar lyrical themes made the US country top-30 the same year: "The Shirt", "Pursuing Happiness" and "Don't Let That Doorknob Hit You". They were included on her solo studio album, Please Don't Hurt Me, and her collaborative release with Bare and Anderson, also called The Game of Triangles. Both discs made the US country albums chart, with Please Don't Hurt Me reaching the top-10.

=== 1967–1973: Leaving The Porter Wagoner Show and continued recordings ===
Norma Jean and Wagoner's professional relationship became romantic for a brief period in the 1960s. In 1967, it was announced that she was leaving the cast of The Porter Wagoner Show after seven years as a cast member and her replacement would be then up-and-coming, Dolly Parton. In the book Finding Her Voice: The History of Women in Country Music, she recounted that telling Wagoner about her departure "was not real cordial" due to their romantic affair. Nonetheless, Norma Jean continued recording for the RCA label. The 1967 single "Jackson Ain't a Very Big Town" made the US country top-40 and was followed by a song about female restaurant workers called "Heaven Help the Working Girl". The latter became a US top-20 country hit, rising to number 18 in early 1968 and was featured on 1968 LP with the same title that featured similar songs about assertive women. "Jackson Ain't a Very Big Town" was also included on album of the same name that made it to number 11 on the country LP's survey.

In 1968, Norma Jean recorded a song related to the truck-driving country subgenre called "Truck Drivin' Woman" whose promotional picture featured her standing next to the door of a semi-trailer truck. Despite the single release only reaching number 53 on the country chart, it received positive reviews from critics. It was included on the 1968 LP, Body and Mind, which consisted of tracks with lyrical content focused on infidelity. The same year, "You Changed Everything About Me But My Name" became her last US country top-40 song entry and was included on the 1968 album, Love's a Woman's Job. Both of her 1968 album offerings made the top-40 of the US country albums survey.

In 1969, a song about the hardships of poverty called "Dusty Road" made the US country top-50. It was the only new recording included on her next album offering titled Country Giants, which was described in its liner notes as a "gigantic collection of country hits". The disc was her final to make the country albums chart, rising into the top-40 in 1969. The same year, she also left her membership with the Grand Ole Opry. Norma Jean continued recording for RCA in the early 1970s but failed to have the same commercial success she previously had, possibly linked to her disbandment from Wagoner's show. Among her later RCA LP's was Another Man Loved Me Last Night (1970), whose songs centered on "heartbreak and regret", according to AllMusic's Greg Adams. In 1971, "The Kind of Needin' I Need" became her last solo single to make the US country chart, rising to number 42. Among her last RCA albums was 1972's I Guess That Comes From Being Poor, a concept disc that described poverty and was praised by critics for its unique musical selection. She eventually left RCA in 1973.

== Discography ==
Studio albums

- Let's Go All the Way (1964)
- Pretty Miss Norma Jean (1965)
- Please Don't Hurt Me (1966)
- Norma Jean Sings a Tribute to Kitty Wells (1966)
- The Game of Triangles (with Bobby Bare and Liz Anderson) (1967)
- Norma Jean Sings Porter Wagoner (1967)
- Jackson Ain't a Very Big Town (1967)
- Heaven's Just a Prayer Away (1968)
- Heaven Help the Working Girl (1968)
- Body and Mind (1968)
- Love's a Woman's Job (1968)
- Country Giants (1969)
- Another Man Loved Me Last Night (1970)
- It's Time for Norma Jean (1970)
- Norma Jean (1971)
- Norma Jean Sings Hank Cochran Songs (1971)
- Thank You for Loving Me (1972)
- I Guess That Comes from Being Poor (1972)
- The Only Way to Hold Your Man (1973)
- Pretty Miss...Norma Jean (1983)
- One Day at a Time (1995)
- Loneliest Star in Texas (2005)
- Norma Jean's Cowboy Church Gospel (2012)
- Aged to Perfection (2014)
