= The Game of Triangles =

Studio album by Bobby Bare, Norma Jean and Liz Anderson
- Released: January 1967
- Recorded: 1966
- Genres: Country, Nashville Sound
- Label: RCA Victor
- Producers: Bob Ferguson, Chet Atkins, Felton Jarvis

Bobby Bare chronology
This I Believe (1966)	The Game of Triangles (1967)	A Bird Named Yesterday (1967)

Norma Jean chronology
Norma Jean Sings a Tribute to Kitty Wells (1966)	The Game of Triangles (1967)	Norma Jean Sings Porter Wagoner (1967)

Liz Anderson chronology
(My Friends Are Gonna Be) Strangers (1966)	The Game of Triangles (1967)	Liz Anderson Sings (1967)

The Game of Triangles is a studio album by Bobby Bare, Norma Jean and Liz Anderson. It was Bobby Bare's tenth studio album, Norma Jean's fourth and Liz Anderson's second. The title song was a top 5 country hit for the trio. They were nominated for Best Country & Western Performance Duet, Trio or Group (Vocal or Instrumental) at the 10th Annual Grammy Awards. Only six of the album's songs were performed by all three artists, each of whom also contributed two solo performances to the album. The album was released as a music download on April 3, 2015 by Sony Legacy. On January 1, 2018, the European record label Morello released it as a deluxe cd also featuring the tracks from two Bobby Bare duet albums with Skeeter Davis.

== Track listing ==
1. "One Among the Three of Us" (Vic McAlpin)
2. "The Wife of the Party" (Liz Anderson) (Liz Anderson solo)
3. "Pursuing Happiness" (Harlan Howard) (Norma Jean solo)
4. "Guess I'll Move on Down the Line" (Ken Sonnenberg, Martin Siegel) (Bobby Bare solo)
5. "Bye Bye Love" (Boudleaux Bryant, Felice Bryant)
6. "The Game of Triangles" (Cy Coben)
7. "Homesick" (Billy C. Cole) (Bobby Bare solo)
8. "Fairy Tale" (Liz Anderson) (Liz Anderson solo)
9. "Three Mixed Up Hearts" (Ben Peters)
10. "Don't Let That Doorknob Hit You" (Vic McAlpin) (Norma Jean solo)
11. "Which One Is to Blame" (Redd Stewart, Sunny Dull)

== Personnel ==
- Bobby Bare - vocals, guitar, (Lead vocals 4 & 7)
- Liz Anderson - vocals (Lead vocals 2 & 8)
- Norma Jean - vocals (lead vocals 3 & 10)

== Charts ==
Chart (1968)	Peak position
US Billboard Country Albums	18
