= T-Shirt (disambiguation) =

A t-shirt is a type of shirt.

T-Shirt may also refer to:

- T-Shirt (pop duo), a short-lived English pop duo
- T Shirt (album), a 1976 album by Loudon Wainwright III
- "T-Shirt" (Shontelle song), 2008
- "T-Shirt" (Thomas Rhett song), 2016
- "T-Shirt" (Migos song), 2017
- "T-Shirt", a 2004 song by Destiny's Child from Destiny Fulfilled
- "T-Shirt", a 2005 song by They Might Be Giants
- "T-Shirt", a 2014 song by Future from Honest
- T-Shirt (T-Bag), a children's TV character
