= Mama Spank =

Single by Liz Anderson

from the album Liz Anderson Sings
- B-side: "To the Landlord"
- Released: November 2, 1964
- Genre: Country
- Length: 2:37
- Label: RCA Victor
- Songwriter(s): Liz Anderson
- Producer(s): Felton Jarvis

Liz Anderson singles chronology
"Wife of the Party" (1966)	"Mama Spank" (1964)	"Tiny Tears" (1967)

Mama Spank is a song written and recorded by American country music artist Liz Anderson. The song peaked at number five on U.S. Billboards Hot Country Singles chart and became the most successful record of Anderson's recording career and went on to earn Anderson a Grammy nomination for Best Female Country Vocal Performance competing against Skeeter Davis, Connie Smith, Dottie West, and the ultimate winner, Tammy Wynette.

== Content ==
This song is a typically comic-tinged Anderson number with her fed up with her wandering husband, deciding to speak to him like a child since he's behaving as a young child, "twenty-eight, going on three." "When the big hand is on twelve and the little hand on six" Anderson informs, she expects her husband to be home from work or "your mama get a stick and mama spank".

== Chart performance ==
Chart (1966)	Peak position
U.S. Billboard Hot Country Singles	5
