= Grady and Hazel Cole =

20th-century American songwriting couple

- Origin: LaFayette, Georgia, United States (Grady)
- Occupations: Musician, songwriter
- Years active: 1934–1950
- Label: Bluebird
- Past members: Grady Cole; Hazel Cole

Grady Cole and Hazel Cole were a husband-and-wife songwriting team that produced many hits in the 1930s and 1940s. They are best known for the gospel tune "The Tramp on the Street", however the song Tramp on the Street was actually written by a sharecropper in Mississippi Elizabeth Mae Wyatt and sold a song popularized by Hank Williams and Joan Baez.
