= Let's Go All the Way (Norma Jean song) =

Single by Norma Jean

from the album Let's Go All the Way
- B-side: "Private Little World"
- Released: November 1963
- Genre: Country
- Length: 2:44
- Label: RCA Victor
- Songwriter: Dusty Rose
- Producer: Chet Atkins

Norma Jean singles chronology
"Someplace to Cry" (1960)	"Let's Go All the Way" (1963)	"I'm a Walkin' Advertisement (For the Blues)" (1964)

"Let's Go All the Way" is a song written by Dusty Rose that was originally recorded by American singer, Norma Jean. It was released as a single in November 1963 by RCA Victor and became a top-20 hit on the US Hot Country Songs chart, becoming her first commercially-successful release.

== Background, content and recording ==
Along with being part of Porter Wagoner's television show, Norma Jean had her own solo career in the country genre. After joining his road and television shows, Wagoner helped her secure a recording contract with RCA Victor in the 1960s. Her first solo commercial success was "Let's Go All the Way". Composed by Dusty Rose and produced by Chet Atkins, the song describes a suggestion made by a woman who asks her partner to take their relationship to the next level. On the television program Country's Family Reunion, Norma Jean remembered that "Let's Go All the Way" was brought to her by Wagoner. He thought of the tune as a duet, but if it was cut as a solo recording, it could be successful for her.

== Release, critical reception and chart performance ==
"Let's Go All the Way" was released as a single by RCA Victor in November 1963. It was distributed as a seven-inch record featuring the B-side, "Private Little World". Although a written review was not provided, Billboard magazine gave the single a four-star rating in November 1963. In the book Finding Their Voice, authors Mary A. Bufwack and Robert K. Oermann called it an "eyebrow-raising proposition". "Let's Go All the Way" made its debut on the US Billboard Hot Country Songs chart on January 4, 1964. It spent 19 weeks on the chart, peaking at the number 11 position later that year. It was one of five songs in Norma Jean's career that made the Billboard country top-20. It later served as the name of her debut studio album, which was released in November 1964 and served as its title track.

In 1982, Norma Jean and Claude Gray re-recorded the song as a duet and it was released as a single on Granny White Records. It reached number 68 on the US Billboard country chart.

== Track listings ==
7" vinyl single (1963)

- "Let's Go All the Way" – 2:44
- "Private Little World" – 2:19

7" vinyl single (1982)

- "Let's Go All the Way" – 2:45
- "We Climbed a Mountain Last Night" – NA

== Charts ==
Chart (1964)	Peak position
US Hot Country Songs (Billboard)	11
Chart (1982)	Peak position
US Hot Country Songs (Billboard)	68
