= Go Cat Go =

Single by Norma Jean

from the album Pretty Miss Norma Jean
- B-side: "Lonesome Number One"
- Released: September 1964
- Genre: Country; bluegrass
- Length: 2:06
- Label: RCA Victor
- Songwriter: Harlan Howard
- Producers: Chet Atkins; Bob Ferguson

Norma Jean singles chronology
| "I'm a Walkin' Advertisement (For the Blues)" (1964) | "Go Cat Go" (1964) | "I Cried All the Way to the Bank" (1965) |

"Go Cat Go" is a song written by Harlan Howard that was originally recorded by American singer, Norma Jean. Released as a single, it reached the top-10 on the US country songs chart, becoming one of several top-10 songs she had in her career. It received positive reviews from publications following its release.

== Background, recording and content ==
Porter Wagoner's touring partner and a regular of his television show, Norma Jean also had a string of hit country songs during the 1960s about working class values. Wagoner helped her get signed with RCA Victor and she had first commercial success with the top-15 single, "Let's Go All the Way". "Go Cat Go" would prove to be a greater chart success in her career. It was composed by Harlan Howard and co-produced between Chet Atkins and Bob Ferguson. "Go Cat Go" describes a woman who wants to separate from her overly-social male partner. The song's tempo is set to a shuffle with elements of bluegrass embedded into its musical style.

== Release, critical reception and chart performance ==
"Go Cat Go" was released as a single by RCA Victor in September 1964 and was distributed as a seven-inch vinyl disc, featuring the B-side, "Lonesome Number One". The single was given positive reviews from publications. Billboard called it "another winning side" and concluded, "Norma lets loose on this swinging weeper. Plenty get up and go." Cash Box described the tune as "ultra commercial" and believed it would "repeat the success" of her previous singles. This proved true when "Go Cat Go" reached the top-10. Debuting on the US Billboard Hot Country Songs chart on October 10, 1964, it spent 22 weeks there, reaching the number eight position. It was one of three top-10 Billboard country singles Norma Jean had in her career. It also reached number 34 on the Billboard Bubbling Under Hot 100 chart, becoming her only single to reach that chart. It was later included on her second studio album titled Pretty Miss Norma Jean (1965).

== Track listing ==
7" vinyl single

- "Go Cat Go" – 2:06
- "Lonesome Number One" – 2:18

== Charts ==
| Chart (1964) | Peak position |
|---|---|
| US Bubbling Under Hot 100 (Billboard) | 34 |
| US Hot Country Songs (Billboard) | 8 |
