= Liz Anderson =

American country music singer-songwriter (1927–2011)

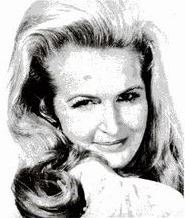
- Anderson in 1971

Background information
- Born: Elizabeth Jane Haaby; January 13, 1927; Roseau, Minnesota, U.S.
- Died: October 31, 2011 (aged 84) Nashville, Tennessee, U.S.
- Genres: Country
- Instruments: Vocals
- Years active: 1964–2011
- Labels: RCA Victor, Epic, Showboat
- Spouse: Clarence "Casey" Anderson (m. 1946)

Elizabeth Jane Anderson (née Haaby; January 13, 1927 – October 31, 2011) was an American country music singer-songwriter who was one in a wave of new-generation female vocalists in the genre during the 1960s to write and record her own songs on a regular basis. Writing in The New York Times, Bill Friskics-Warren noted, "Like her contemporary Loretta Lynn, Ms. Anderson gave voice to female survivors; inhabiting their struggles in a soprano at times alluring, at times sassy."

Anderson received two Grammy Award nominations in 1967, one for "Best Female Country Vocal Performance" for her self-penned, top-five hit "Mama Spank", and the other for "Best Country Vocal Group" for the top-five hit "The Game of Triangles", with Bobby Bare and Norma Jean. As a songwriter, she scored 26 top-50 hits in the 1960s, more than any other female songwriter that decade in the country music industry.

Anderson also wrote many of the early hits for her daughter, Lynn Anderson, whose recording career began less than a year after her mother's. She wrote several hits for other notable artists, including Merle Haggard. Haggard had his first top-10 and number-one hits, respectively, with "(My Friends Are Gonna Be) Strangers" and "I'm a Lonesome Fugitive", both penned by Anderson. He named his band "The Strangers", after the hit "(My Friends Are Gonna Be) Strangers".

== Biography ==
Born Elizabeth Jane Haaby in Roseau, Minnesota, on January 13, 1927, or March 13, 1930, she played the family mandolin as a child and also sang in the local church. At age 13, the family moved west to Grand Forks, North Dakota. At the age of 19, Liz was married to Casey Anderson and then had her daughter Lynn a year later. She studied at the Redwood City Business College in Redwood City, California, and worked as a secretary.

== Early career ==
In 1957, the family moved to Sacramento, California. The limited popularity at the time of country music in California led Anderson to start writing songs. Casey was a member of the sheriff's posse, which was going to take part in the National Centennial Pony Express Celebration. Casey convinced his wife to write a song in honor of the Pony Express. The song was named the official song.

Anderson began publishing her songs and made friends within the burgeoning country music community in Bakersfield during the early 1960s. Some of the first hits from her pen were "Be Quiet Mind" by Del Reeves and "Pick of the Week", which was recorded by Roy Drusky in 1964. In 1965, Merle Haggard recorded her song "All My Friends Are Gonna Be Strangers". She won a BMI award for the song. Anderson published over 260 songs during her career and earned five BMI awards. Anderson also wrote Conway Twitty's first country hit, "Guess My Eyes Were Bigger Than My Heart". Many major country artists of the 1960s recorded at least one of her songs on their albums, including Charley Pride, Tammy Wynette, Ernest Tubb, Loretta Lynn, George Jones, Skeeter Davis, Waylon Jennings, Kitty Wells, Connie Smith, Faron Young, The Browns, Porter Wagoner, Jerry Lee Lewis, and Bill Anderson. She was also friends with Chart Records owner Slim Williamson (where daughter Lynn recorded) and provided many of the label's artists with songs, including Connie Eaton, LaWanda Lindsey, and Billy "Crash" Craddock. Singers who recorded her material in later years included Lorrie Morgan and Mary Lou Turner.

Anderson demonstration vocals were noticed by RCA producer Chet Atkins, who signed her to RCA in 1965. Almost 40 at the time, Anderson's year of birth was slightly lowered to 1930 in publicity materials of the era. Anderson's two initial singles fared well, and her third, "Game of Triangles", with Bobby Bare and Norma Jean became a top-five hit. In April 1967, Anderson again had a top-five country hit, "Mama Spank". Among Anderson's most popular recordings were "Go Now Pay Later" (1966), "The Wife of the Party" (1967), "Tiny Tears" (1967), "Thanks A Lot For Tryin' Anyway" (1968) (written by Jim Glaser; one of her few hits written by someone else), and "Husband Hunting" (1970).

Around this same time, her only child, daughter Lynn, was rising as a country singer. Anderson wrote a number of her daughter's early hits, including her 1967 debut single "Ride, Ride, Ride", as well as her first big hit, the top-five "If I Kiss You (Will You Go Away)" (also in 1967). Liz and Lynn had a top-25 duet with "Mother May I" in 1968, and appeared together on a Mother's Day episode of the Lawrence Welk Show that May. Lynn would later have her biggest success in the 1970s, becoming one of country music's most successful female vocalists.

== Later career and death ==
In 1971, Anderson moved to Epic Records, and released the four charting singles produced by then-son-in-law Glenn Sutton, which went no higher than the country top 60. One of those singles was a cover version of "I'll Never Fall in Love Again". In 1974, she released a Christmas single, the self-penned "Christopher the Christmas Seal", on the small Hobby Horse Records label.

Anderson did not record again until she released a single for the Scorpion Records label in 1978 that did not chart. She continued to write, however, and one of her songs was a top-40 country success for Faron Young in 1977. In 1979, Lorrie Morgan had one of her first charted songs with an Anderson composition "Tell Me I'm Only Dreaming", which went to number 88 in 1979 and was one of the last charting songs written by Anderson.

Her lone 1980s recording was the album My Last Rose for Tudor Records, which contained original material and covers of well-known songs. In the mid-1990s, Anderson started her own record company, Showboat Records. The Cowgirl Way was her first album in over a decade. She also recorded an album of Christmas songs and another one of children's songs, most of them written by her. In 2006, Lynn Anderson released an album for the label entitled Cowgirl, composed entirely of songs penned by her mother.

Anderson died aged 84 years in Nashville on October 31, 2011.

== Discography ==
Studio albums

- (My Friends Are Gonna Be) Strangers (1966)
- The Game of Triangles (with Bobby Bare and Norma Jean) (1967)
- Liz Anderson Sings (1967)
- Cookin' Up Hits (1967)
- Liz Anderson Sings Her Favorites (1968)
- Like a Merry-Go Round (1968)
- Country Style (1969)
- If the Creek Don't Rise (1969)
- Husband Hunting (1970)
- My Last Rose (1983)
- Christmas Songs for Kids of All Ages (with Casey Anderson) (1988)
- The Fairy Grandmother Sings Children's Songs for National Holidays (2004)

== Major country hits written by Liz Anderson ==
Anderson enjoyed her greatest success as a songwriter, receiving many awards for her work, including several BMI awards. She also served as vice president of the Nashville Songwriters Association International. The following is a list of her songs which made the top 50 on Billboard's country chart (with chart rankings). In 1966 and 1967, Anderson had six top-50 hits as a songwriter each year, likely a record still to this date among female country music songwriters.

Year	Title	Artist(s)	Billboard
1961	"Be Quiet Mind"	Del Reeves	9
1963	"Robert E. Lee"	Ott Stephens	15
1963	"The Way it Feels to Die"	Vernon Stewart	17
1964	"Just Between The Two of Us"	Merle Haggard and Bonnie Owens	28
1964	"Pick of the Week"	Roy Drusky	13
1964	"Be Quiet Mind"	Ott Stephens	23
1965	"All My Friends Are Gonna Be Strangers"	Merle Haggard	10
1965	"I Cried All The Way To The Bank"	Norma Jean	21
1965	"I Keep Forgettin' That I Forgot About You "	Wynn Stewart	43
1965	"(From Now on All) My Friends Are Gonna Be Strangers"	Roy Drusky	6
1966	"Go Now Pay Later"	Liz Anderson	23
1966	"Guess My Eyes Were Bigger Than My Heart"	Conway Twitty	18
1966	"So Much for Me, So Much for You"	Liz Anderson	45
1966	"Ride Ride Ride"	Lynn Anderson	36
1966	"Ride Ride Ride" (pop Billboard Hot 100 cover)	Brenda Lee	37
1966	"The Wife of The Party"	Liz Anderson	22
1967	"I'm a Lonesome Fugitive"	Merle Haggard	1
1967	"If I Kiss You"	Lynn Anderson	5
1967	"Mama Spank"	Liz Anderson	5
1967	"Tiny Tears"	Liz Anderson	24
1967	"Keeping Up Appearances"	Lynn Anderson and Jerry Lane	49
1967	"The Words I'm Gonna Have To Eat"	Bill Phillips	10
1968	"Big Girls Don't Cry"	Lynn Anderson	12
1968	"Like A Merry Go Round"	Liz Anderson	43
1968	"Mother May I"	Liz & Lynn Anderson	21
1968	"Here's To You and Me"	Tex Williams	45
1969	"Flattery Will Get You Everywhere"	Lynn Anderson	11
1970	"Husband Hunting"	Liz Anderson	26
1977	"Crutches"	Faron Young	25

== Awards and nominations ==
Year	Award program	Award	Result
1967	Grammy Awards	Best Female Country Vocal Performance for "Mama Spank"	Nominated
1967	Grammy Awards	Best Country Duo/Group Vocal Performance for "The Game of Triangles" (with Bobby Bare and Norma Jean)	Nominated
