= Vic McAlpin =

American songwriter

Vic McAlpin (1918–1980) was an American songwriter.

== Biography ==
Originating from Defeated Creek in eastern Tennessee, McAlpin moved to Nashville at a young age. His passion for hillbilly music led him to the Grand Ole Opry, where he met Roy Acuff and Eddy Arnold. His debut composition, "All Alone in the World Without You," hit the country Top 10 in 1946, performed by Arnold.

McAlpin held various roles in the music industry. He wrote for Acuff-Rose Publications and Acclaim Music, promoted for Columbia Records, and later managed Melody Trails Publishing. His songs were performed by artists including Johnny Cash, Kitty Wells, Ferlin Husky, and Glen Campbell.

In 1970, McAlpin was inducted into the Nashville Songwriters Hall of Fame.

McAlpin died in 1980.
