= Bob Ferguson (musician) =

American country songwriter and producer (1927–2001)

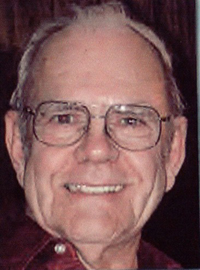
- Ferguson photographed by his son

Background information
- Also known as: Eli Possumtrot
- Born: Robert Bruce Ferguson; December 30, 1927; Willow Springs, Missouri, U.S.
- Died: July 22, 2001 (aged 73) Jackson, Mississippi, U.S.
- Genres: Country
- Occupations: Singer, songwriter, actor, author, philanthropist
- Instruments: Vocals, guitar, steel string, piano
- Years active: 1955–1978
- Label: RCA Victor
- Formerly of: Ferlin Husky, Harvie June Van, Chet Atkins, Dolly Parton, Porter Wagoner, Jim Ed Brown, Helen Cornelius

Robert Bruce Ferguson (December 30, 1927 – July 22, 2001) was an American country music songwriter and record producer who was instrumental in establishing Nashville, Tennessee as a center of country music. He was also a movie producer, and Choctaw Indian historian. Ferguson is best known for writing the bestselling songs "On the Wings of a Dove" and "The Carroll County Accident". The "Carroll County Accident" won the Country Music Association Song of the Year in 1969. In 1983 "Wings of a Dove" was featured in the movie Tender Mercies starring Robert Duvall. In 1987, Broadcast Music Incorporated (BMI) awarded Ferguson with the "million air" plays for the "Wings of a Dove."

The country song "Carroll County Accident", recorded by Porter Wagoner, made No. 2 on the Billboard country singles chart (No. 92 pop) and No. 1 on the Cash Box country singles chart. The tune was also recorded by Wagoner's longtime duet partner Dolly Parton. Ferguson married twice, first to Harvie June Van (1950s/60s) then to Martha Jean Lewis (1970 to 2001).

== Biography ==
=== Early life and education ===
Ferguson was born in Willow Springs, Missouri, the third son of John Carl and Mary Willie Boles Ferguson. His brothers were John Carl, Alan Claude, and Paul Eugene. John Carl attended the United States Naval Academy and graduated in 1944. Alan Claude became a renowned forest ranger. Paul Eugene, as an enlisted sailor, witnessed many Pacific Proving Grounds atomic tests while aboard the USS Estes. The Fergusons have a rich legacy including ancestors whom participated in the American Revolution.

While in high school, Ferguson was a typesetter at the local newspaper, a fire tower lookout for the U.S. Forest Service, and a member of the Missouri State Guard during World War II. After graduating from high school in 1945, he entered the U.S. Army. He attained the rank of sergeant and served as a radioman for two winters in Alaska. He tested military equipment under Arctic conditions. He went on to study at Southwest Missouri State University.

After discharge from the Army, Ferguson went out West and worked for the U.S. Forest Service as a fire tower lookout and trail crew boss. He also worked as a laborer in the wheat fields and a typesetter for the newspaper in Moses Lake, Washington. He led the Boy Scout Troop from that city to the Boy Scout Jamboree at Valley Forge, Pennsylvania, in 1950.

Ferguson then entered Washington State College, Pullman, Washington, under the G.I. Bill and earned a BS degree in Speech. He specialized in radio and television production.

While in college, Ferguson joined a Marine Forces Reserve unit. He was called to duty during the Korean War (1950–1952). Ferguson served as a drill instructor at Marine Corps Recruit Depot San Diego and producer of Marine training motion pictures.

=== Tennessee Game and Fish Commission ===
From about 1955-1961, Ferguson worked at the Tennessee Game and Fish Commission, headquartered in Nashville, where he produced films for the agency. In 1959, Ferguson was to produce for the commission a 39 segment series on hunting, fishing, and wildlife subjects. In 1960, the North American Wildlife Conservation Association named his production The World Outdoors the "Best Motion Picture of the Year." The World Outdoors influenced many wildlife television shows, most notably Mutual of Omaha's Wild Kingdom series.

While working there, Ferguson also started in the music business. In 1958 he wrote his first multi-million seller song "On the Wings of a Dove". It was recorded by Ferlin Husky whom Ferguson met in El Cajon, California. It has since been recorded by many artists and in many languages around the world. It was featured in the movie Tender Mercies (1983), starring Robert Duvall. In 1987, "Wings of a Dove" received BMI's "One million airplays" Award.

Performing with Husky, Ferguson played a character called Eli Possumtrout in The Good Old Days, a motion picture produced by the Tennessee Game and Fish Commission.

=== Nashville record producer ===
After graduation from college, Ferguson moved to Nashville, Tennessee, as manager for Ferlin Husky.

"Tex Ritter once explained that ... It would be impossible to point to just one example of good fortune, or good timing, and say 'Right there was my big break.'"

— Burt & Ferguson- So You Want To Be In Music!, 1970

The success of his song "On the Wings of a Dove" enabled Ferguson to turn full-time to music. He became a senior producer with RCA Victor, where he helped create the Nashville Sound of the 1950s and 1960s. He served as executive assistant to Chet Atkins until his retirement. While there, he produced records, many in RCA Studio A. He particularly worked with producing the acts of Porter Wagoner, Dolly Parton, (from 1967 - 75 he produced nearly all of Wagoner and Parton's duet albums, as well as all of their respective solo releases during that time) and Connie Smith. He also produced records by Floyd Cramer, Danny Davis, The Browns, Helen Cornelius, Lester Flatt, Homer and Jethro, Charlie Pride and many others. With Atkins, he played a major role in the development of what was to become known as the Nashville Sound and elevated Nashville as the country music capital of the world. He also played a major role in developing the Country Music Association. His first successful single was with The Avons.

Ferguson developed a comedy role as "Grandpappy Eli Possumtrot", a name which he took from a crossroad community near his childhood home in the Ozarks. In that role, he recorded his own song, "Eli's Blue", a lament about a man who accidentally shot his dog.

Ferguson wrote several other songs, including the million seller, "Carroll County Accident", first recorded by Porter Wagoner. In 1969 it received a Country Music Award for the "Song of the Year". In the 1960s Ferguson also wrote "Natividad", a Christmas song, and "Choctaw Saturday Night", a tribute to Choctaw Native Americans.

The country song "Carroll County Accident" was written when Ferguson passed through Carroll County when driving from Nashville to a concert for the Choctaw Indians in Philadelphia, Miss., according to an interview Ferguson granted with Steve Eng for the Wagoner biography A Satisfied Mind. He recounted that he passed a sign for Carroll County in Tennessee, which inspired the song's title, and when he saw a sign for Carroll County in Mississippi the song was a finished work. Wagoner took the song to No. 2 on the Billboard country singles chart (No. 92 pop) and No. 1 on the Cash Box country singles chart. The tune was also recorded by Wagoner's longtime duet partner Dolly Parton.

=== Writer ===
Ferguson and Dolly Parton at RCA Records, signing her initial recording contract for RCA, 1967.

With Jesse Burt as co-author, Ferguson wrote two books: So You Want to be in Music and Southeastern Indians: Then and Now.

So You Want to be in Music is a book about the music industry for aspiring songwriting and recording professionals. Southeastern Indians: Then and Now is a general-interest book about Native Americans of the Deep South, covering the Choctaw, Cherokee, Creek, Chickasaw, and Seminole tribes.

=== Anthropology ===
While working at RCA, Ferguson earned a Master's Degree in anthropology from Vanderbilt University. He served as volunteer Project Director and President of Southeastern Indian Antiquities Survey and in that role oversaw the survey, recovery, and preservation of remains and artifacts unearthed during construction in the Nashville area. One startling discovery was the remains of the first saber-toothed tiger found east of the Mississippi River. It was found during construction of the Regions Center, former First American Bank building, in downtown Nashville. On September 25, 1997, the newly established hockey team, the Nashville Predators, adopted the head of a saber-toothed tiger as their logo.

=== Final years and death ===
"In the rich tapestry of American life, ... the southeastern Indian and his brothers everywhere see their own special and beautiful heritage. They are Americans who happen to be Indians and are proud of it.'"

— Burt & Ferguson- Indians of the Southeast: Then and Now, 1973

After his retirement from RCA, Ferguson moved his family to live near the reservation of the Mississippi Band of Choctaw Indians in Philadelphia, Mississippi. He had worked in various capacities with the tribe since the 1950s. There he served as editor of the Choctaw Times, and historian and audio- visual producer for the Mississippi Band of Choctaw Indians. In that role, he helped establish the Museum of the Southern Indian (Choctaw Museum) in 1981. He also worked part-time as promotional director of the Chucalissa Prehistoric Indian Village in Memphis, Tennessee. In 1983, he created the foundation for Choctaw Video Productions and created numerous tribal productions.

In 1987, Ferguson established WHTV as local cable service for Pearl River/Philadelphia, Mississippi. He retired from that position in 1998, when he was also named Tribal Historian Emeritus. He established the tribe's organic gardening program in 1978.

Ferguson died of cancer on Sunday, July 22, 2001 at 1:05 a.m. in the University of Mississippi Medical Center in Jackson, Mississippi. He was buried at Phillip's Cemetery in rural Neshoba County near Philadelphia, MS.

== Legacy and honors ==
"Jim Ed and I actually met in Studio B at RCA Records where we recorded many of our hits that followed the initial, "I Don't Want To Have To Marry You." He had been an RCA artist for years and I had just been signed to the label, both of us were produced by Bob Ferguson ... Bob Ferguson played some of my demo tape recordings for Jim Ed, but he did not like my voice. Thank goodness Bob convinced him that we would blend, and that the song became a hit. It was the #1 song in the nation three months after we had met in the studio."

— Country Stars Central- Helen Cornelius Interview, 2010

Ferguson was the recipient of many awards and recognitions during his multiple careers. He was also a member of Mensa, a society of people with high I.Q.s.

- 1960, the North American Wildlife Conservation Association named his production The World Outdoors the "Best Motion Picture of the Year."
- 1969, "Carroll County Accident", Country Music Award for the "Song of the Year".
- 1987, "Wings of a Dove" received BMI's "One million airplays" Award.
- 1987, receives the Iron Eyes Cody Peace Medal. Only 48 medals were made and awarded.
- 2012, honored with a Mississippi Country Music Trail marker

== Selection of singles/albums ==
Ferguson worked for nearly 30 years at RCA's Studio B producing hundreds of albums for artists such as Chet Atkins, Dolly Parton, and Porter Wagoner.

- Just Between You And Me - Porter Wagoner and Dolly Parton
- When You Are Here - Harvie June Van, Produced by Chet Atkins
- Jolene - Dolly Parton
- The Open Mind of John D. Loudermilk - John D. Loudermilk
- Connie Smith - Connie Smith
- My Favorite Songwriter: Porter Wagoner - Dolly Parton
- Coast Country - George Hamilton IV
- Jerry Reed Explores Guitar Country - Jerry Reed
