= Encore (Lynn Anderson album) =

Compilation album by Lynn Anderson
- Released: June 1981
- Recorded: 1976–1980
- Genre: Country; Countrypolitan
- Label: Columbia
- Producer: Steve Gibson; Glenn Sutton; David Wolfert

Lynn Anderson chronology
Even Cowgirls Get the Blues (1980)	Encore (1981)	Memories and Desires (1982)

Encore is a compilation album by American country artist Lynn Anderson. It was released in June 1981 via Columbia Records. It combined sessions originally produced in sessions by Steve Gibson, Glenn Sutton and David Wolfert. Encore contained a mixture of recordings previously issued on Anderson's studio albums in the 1970s. It was her fourth compilation release for the Columbia label. It was essentially Greatest Hits Volume Three for Columbia Records.

== Background, content and release ==
Encore contained recordings that Anderson had first released for the Columbia label in the late 1970s. These songs were produced in sessions by her then husband Glenn Sutton. After their divorce in 1977, sessions for Anderson were handled by Steve Gibson and later David Wolfert until her departure from the label in 1980. A total of ten tracks were included on the album package. Nine of the album's songs were released as singles. These singles included the top ten hit "Isn't It Always Love" and the top twenty hits "I Love How You Love Me," "He Ain't You" and "Wrap Your Love All Around Your Man." Also featured are her top 40 hits during this period, including "Even Cowgirls Get the Blues" and "We Got Love."

Encore was released in June 1981 via Columbia Records. It was Anderson's fourth compilation for the label and marked the end of her time recording for the company. The album was released in two versions. First, it was offered as a vinyl LP, containing five songs on each side of the record. Second, it was offered as an audio cassette, with a similar track listing. Like some of her previous compilations, the record did not reach any chart positions on Billboard upon its release. This included the Top Country Albums chart.

== Track listing ==
Side one (Vinyl and cassette versions)
No.	Title	Writer(s)	Length
1.	"Isn't It Always Love"	Karla Bonoff	2:55
2.	"I Love How You Love Me"	Larry Kobler; Barry Mann	3:14
3.	"Blue Baby Blue"	Michael Clark	2:40
4.	"My World Begins and Ends with You"	Larry Keith; Steve Pippin	2:30
5.	"Wrap Your Love All Around Your Man"	Johnny Cunningham	2:39

Side two (Vinyl and cassette versions)
No.	Title	Writer(s)	Length
1.	"Even Cowgirls Get the Blues"	Rodney Crowell	2:57
2.	"Outlaw Is Just a State of Mind"	Sue Sheridan; David Wolfert	4:49
3.	"From the Inside"	Wayne Kent	2:38
4.	"He Ain't You"	Jeff Barry; Brad Burg; Lisa Hartman; Dene Hofheinz	3:06
5.	"We Got Love"	Harry Forness; Keith; Pippin	2:55

== Personnel ==
All credits are adapted from the liner notes of Encore.

Musical and technical personnel

- Lynn Anderson – lead vocals
- Steve Gibson – producer
- Glenn Sutton – producer
- David Wolfert – producer

== Release history ==
Region	Date	Format	Label	Ref.
Canada	1985	Cassette	CBS Select	
United States	June 1981	Cassette	Columbia Records	
United States	June 1981	Vinyl	Columbia Records	
