= Even Cowgirls Get the Blues =

Even Cowgirls Get the Blues may refer to:

- Even Cowgirls Get the Blues (novel), a novel by Tom Robbins
- Even Cowgirls Get the Blues (film), a 1993 film based on the novel
- Even Cowgirls Get the Blues (soundtrack), k.d. lang soundtrack album for the 1993 film
- Even Cowgirls Get the Blues (John Cale album), an album by John Cale, or the title song (1987)
- Even Cowgirls Get the Blues (Lynn Anderson album), a 1980 album by Lynn Anderson, or the title song (see next)
- "Even Cowgirls Get the Blues" (song), a song covered by:
  - Emmylou Harris from Blue Kentucky Girl (1979)
  - Chris Ledoux from Used to Want to Be a Cowboy (1982)
  - Johnny Cash and Waylon Jennings from Heroes (1986)
  - Rodney Crowell from Greatest Hits (1993)
- "Even Cowgirls Get the Blues", a song by La Costa (1977)
- "Even Cowgirls Get the Blues", a song by Robbin Thompson (1980)
- "Even Cowgirls Get the Blues", a song by the Gaslight Anthem from The '59 Sound (2008)
