= Still Life with Woodpecker =

1980 novel by Tom Robbins

- Cover of Still Life With Woodpecker, echoing the design of the Camel cigarette packet
- Author: Tom Robbins
- Language: English language
- Publisher: Bantam Books
- Publication date: October 1980
- Publication place: United States
- Media type: Print (Hardback & Paperback)
- Pages: 277 pp
- ISBN: 0-553-27093-1 (first edition, paperback)
- OCLC: 6683767

Still Life With Woodpecker (1980) is the third novel by Tom Robbins, concerning the love affair between an environmentalist princess and an outlaw. The novel encompasses a broad range of topics, from aliens and redheads to consumerism, the building of bombs, romance, royalty, the Moon, and a pack of Camel cigarettes. The novel continuously addresses the question of "how to make love stay" and is sometimes referred to as a "fable-parody".

== Plot ==
Princess Leigh-Cheri Furstenberg-Barcalona lives with her exiled royal parents King Max and Queen Tilli and their last loyal servant Gulietta in a converted farmhouse in Seattle. While a modern American college student in most respects, Leigh-Cheri has an existentialist view of the cultural symbolism of her title of "princess" and wishes to use it for the good of mankind. To this end, she involves herself in many liberal and ecopolitical causes, including a liberal symposium called CareFest in Hawaii, where many progressive minds gather to present their ideas for improving the world. However, there is so much unnecessary infighting that Leigh-Cheri quickly becomes disenchanted. Leigh-Cheri is further demoralized by a beautiful blonde woman claiming to be an alien from the planet Argon, who denounces Leigh-Cheri for her red hair, stating red hair is a sign that Leigh-Cheri is descended from mutant, renegade Argonians.

In the middle of all this, Leigh-Cheri encounters outlaw bomber and fellow redhead Bernard Mickey Wrangle, known as the Woodpecker, who plans to blow up the CareFest. Leigh-Cheri places Bernard under citizens arrest, only to be drawn in by his outlaw philosophy, which teaches freedom is more important than happiness. Bernard is likewise charmed by Leigh-Cheri's romantic idealism, and the two fall in love. While drunk on tequila, Bernard accidentally blows up a UFO conference taking place opposite the CareFest, after which all the attendees witness a flying saucer escaping, leading Leigh-Cheri to believe the Argonian woman was really an alien.

Leigh-Cheri takes Bernard to meet her parents, but after Bernard accidentally kills Queen Tilli's pet lapdog, he slips out in disgrace. His visit to Seattle leads his recapture and return to prison. In solidarity, Leigh-Cheri transforms her attic bedroom into a copy of Bernard's prison cell, leaving her alone with only a bed, a lamp, and a package of Camel cigarettes. While contemplating the cigarette pack, Leigh-Cheri is drawn to the image of pyramids in the design and determines it is a secret message from the red-haired Argonians advocating self-determination, expressed by the word "CHOICE". Leigh-Cheri's self-imposed exile draws media coverage and causes a movement of people locking themselves away for various causes. Bernard learns Leigh-Cheri is behind the wave of self-imposed imprisonments and sends her a scathing letter for sacrificing both her freedom and her happiness—the antithesis of Bernard's philosophy—and leading others to do the same. Shortly thereafter, Leigh-Cheri is devastated to learn Bernard has been killed in an apparent escape attempt.

Leigh-Cheri leaves her attic exile and agrees to marry the handsome, wealthy Saudi Arabian prince A'ben Fizel on the condition he will build her a pyramid as a wedding gift. A'ben Fizel suspects Leigh-Cheri still loves Bernard and sets spies to follow her. While exploring the completed pyramid the night before the wedding, Leigh-Cheri discovers Bernard, alive, preparing to set up dynamite to destroy the pyramid. While the two reconcile, A'ben Fizel seals the pyramid, leaving the lovers to die.

Trapped for weeks, Bernard and Leigh-Cheri survive on wedding cake and champagne while they discuss pyramids, redheads, the Moon, the Argonian message on the box of Camel cigarettes, and the mystery of "how to make love stay." When their supplies run out, Leigh-Cheri decides to sacrifice herself to save Bernard by using the dynamite to make an opening while Bernard sleeps, determining sacrifice is the only way to make love stay. At the last moment, Bernard awakens and attempts to shield Leigh-Cheri from the blast, causing them both to be caught in the explosion.

The lovers wake in a hospital, alive but rendered deaf by the explosion. In the interim, Leigh-Cheri's father Max has died of a heart attack and Gulietta, revealed to be Max's illegitimate elder sister, has returned to her homeland to rule as queen. Leigh-Cheri and Bernard, their hearing partly restored with hearing aids, move back to Seattle where they remain in love and live happily ever after.

== Characters ==
- King Max Furstenberg-Barcalona - the deposed king, former gambler, sports fanatic, enemy of blackberry brambles, and father of Leigh-Cheri.
- Leigh-Cheri Furstenberg-Barcalona - the former princess, an idealist, nature-lover, and Ralph Nader supporter.
- Queen Tilli Furstenberg-Barcalona - a former queen, silly and simple by nature, who listens to opera and plays with her dog; her favorite Americanism is "Oh-oh, spaghetti-o."
- Gulietta - a maid who does not speak English, is dependent upon cocaine, and is a secret heir.
- Bernard Mickey (originally Baby) Wrangle - known by the nickname "Woodpecker," he has anarchist leanings, is a self-proclaimed outlaw, and employs explosives to destroy buildings; his mantra is "Yum."
- A'ben Fizel - Wealthy Saudi Arabian prince, agrees to marry Leigh-Cheri and funds her pyramid project.

== Reception ==
Kirkus Reviews panned the novel, characterizing the writing as “ plain cute, wise cute, and abstract cute,” providing passages from the text to support. The reviewer considers Robbin’s novel “downright embarrassing,” suitable for “diehard Robbins fans only…others will find it insufferable.”

Reviewer John House at the New York Times dismisses Woodpecker as a retreat from Robbin’s humorous Even Cowgirls Get the Blues (1976), “betray[ing] more cleverness than insight.”

== Retrospective appraisal ==
Literary critic Michael Carlson at The Guardian ranks Still Life With Woodpecker as one of Robbin’s two best novels, the other Jitterbug Perfume (1984).

National Public Radio’s notes that Robbin’s novels present “eccentric characters and bizarre situations [that] reflect a hallucinatory vision.” Indeed, the fabulous events in Woodpecker take place inside a pack of Camel cigarettes.

The language a writer uses, Robbins said — dense, sparkling, brilliant, evocative and seductive — was ultimately more important than their message.

== Theme ==
Biographer Mark Siegel writes that the novel is about the primacy of the individual and "metaphysical outlawism".

Reviewer Gary Lippman at the Los Angeles Review of Books praises the cathartic effects of Robbin’s “literary charms.”

The trick, Robbins’s questing heroes in Woodpecker suggested, was to cultivate in my life some levity, even some enlightened silliness, which would serve as a bulwark against self-pity… By the time I finished Woodpecker, arriving at its luminous final sentence—“It’s never too late to have a happy childhood”—I felt emotionally washed clean.

== Release details ==
- 1980, USA, Bantam (ISBN 0-553-27093-1), Pub date ? Oct 1980, paperback (First edition)
- 1980, USA, Bantam (ISBN 0-553-01260-6), Pub date ? Oct 1980, hardback (Limited to 2,000 copies)
- 1980, UK, Sidgwick & Jackson (ISBN 0-283-98713-8), Pub date ? Oct 1980, hardback
- 1994, USA, Bantam USA (ISBN 0-553-34897-3), Pub date ? December 1994, paperback
- 1994, UK, Bantam (ISBN 0-553-40898-4), Pub date December 1, 1994, paperback
- 2001, USA, No Exit Press (ISBN 1-84243-022-X), Pub date April 9, 2001, paperback

== Sources ==
- Carlson, Michael. 2025. Tom Robbins obituary. The Guardian, February 12, 2025. https://www.theguardian.com/books/2025/feb/12/tom-robbins-obituary Accessed January 1, 2026.
- House, John. 1984. They Brake for Unicorns. New York Times, December 9, 1984. https://www.nytimes.com/1984/12/09/books/they-brake-for-unicorns.html Accessed January 1, 2026.
- Lippman, Gary. 2025. The Syrup of Wahoo Keeps Splashing Around. Los Angeles Review of Books, March 4, 2025.https://lareviewofbooks.org/article/the-syrup-of-wahoo-keeps-splashing-around/ Accessed January 1, 2026.
- Siegel, Mark 1980. Tom Robbins: Western Writers Series. University of Wyoming. ISBN 978-0884300663 . https://scholarworks.boisestate.edu/cgi/viewcontent.cgi?article=1021&context=wws Retrieved January 2, 2026.
- Vitale, Tom. 2025. Bestselling novelist Tom Robbins dies at 92. National Public Radio, February 9, 2025, https://www.npr.org/2025/02/09/1167079326/tom-robbins-obituary-novelist Accessed January 1, 2026.
- Tom Robbins (1990). Still Life with Woodpecker. Random House Publishing Group. p. 288. ISBN 9780553348972.
