= Wrap Your Love All Around Your Man =

Wrap Your Love All Around Your Man may refer to:

- "Wrap Your Love All Around Your Man" (song), a 1977 single by Lynn Anderson
- Wrap Your Love All Around Your Man (album), a 1977 album by Lynn Anderson
