= Villa Incognito =

2003 novel by Tom Robbins

- First edition (hardcover)
- Author: Tom Robbins
- Language: English
- Publisher: Bantam Books
- Publication date: 2003
- Publication place: United States
- Media type: Print (hardback & paperback)
- Pages: 241 pp
- ISBN: 0-553-80332-8
- OCLC: 51478089
- Dewey Decimal: 813/.54 21
- LC Class: PS3568.O233 V55 2003

Villa Incognito is a novel by Tom Robbins published in 2003. This brief work shares the style, humor, and underlying cultural commentary of Robbins's better-known novels. It is recognized as a response to 9/11 and as a commentary on the Vietnam War. Villa Incognito was his last published novel.

== Characters ==
Villa Incognito begins with the story of Tanuki, an ancient Japanese badger-like creature who possesses the ability to shapeshift and a penchant for sake and women. Tanuki is a "semi-god" with an unusually large scrotum and is portrayed alongside a beautiful young female character, who continues Tanuki's lineage with the use of a chrysanthemum seed embedded in the roof of her mouth, three American MIAs who deliberately remain in Laos long after US involvement in the Vietnam War has ended, and two sisters, who are related to one of the missing American soldiers.

== Plot ==
The novel is set in the present day. Its title refers to a house in Laos inhabited by three American Air Force pilots who have been missing since the Vietnam War. Following the arrest of one of the MIAs, for trafficking drugs while dressed as a priest, the novel depicts American life in a post-9/11 context through the involvement of the two sisters.

== Reception ==
The novel received generally favorable reviews in major outlets. In Publishers Weekly, despite criticism of a "weak ending" the book is called a "delectable farce" that is "true to the mark." The Chicago Tribune review terms it a "baffling but wonderful ride."
