= Half Asleep in Frog Pajamas =

1994 novel by Tom Robbins

- First edition (hardcover)
- Author: Tom Robbins
- Language: English
- Genre: Fiction novel
- Publisher: Bantam Books
- Publication date: 1994
- Publication place: United States
- Media type: Print (Hardcover & Paperback
- Pages: 386 pp
- ISBN: 0-553-07625-6
- OCLC: 30398869
- Dewey Decimal: 813/.54 20
- LC Class: PS3568.O233 H35 1994

Half Asleep in Frog Pajamas is a 1994 novel by Tom Robbins, published by Bantam Books.

== Overview ==
Like Robbins' other books, the plot involves an eclectic mix of characters and complicated scenarios, and mixes the mundane with the mysterious, in the form of the Sirius mysteries and the mythology surrounding the Dogon Tribe. Unlike his other books, Half Asleep is written entirely in the second person, present tense.

Robbins was a personal friend of Terence McKenna, whose influence is evident in several of his books. A main character in Half Asleep in Frog Pajamas named Larry Diamond advocates a theory similar to those of McKenna, involving psilocybin.

== Release details ==
- Hardcover – ISBN 0-553-07625-6 (ISBN 978-0-553-07625-7) published on August 1, 1994 by Bantam Books
- Paperback – ISBN 0-553-37787-6 (ISBN 978-0-553-37787-3) published on November 1, 1995 by Bantam Books
