= From the Inside =

From the Inside may refer to:

- From the Inside (Alice Cooper album), or the title song, 1978
- From the Inside (Laura Pausini album), 2002
- From the Inside (Lynn Anderson album), or the title song, 1978
- From the Inside (Poco album), or the title song, 1971
- "From the Inside" (Marcia Hines song), 1975
- "From the Inside" (Linkin Park song), 2004
- "From the Inside" (video game), 2022
- "From the Inside", a song by Def Leppard, a B-side of the single "Have You Ever Needed Someone So Bad"
- "From the Inside", a song by Depswa from Two Angels and a Dream
- From the Inside, a band fronted by Danny Vaughn
