= Skinny Legs and All =

Skinny Legas and All may refer to:

- Skinny Legs and All (novel), a 1990 novel by Tom Robbins
- "Skinny Legs and All" (song), a 1967 R&B song by Joe Tex
