= Wild Ducks Flying Backward =

Book by Tom Robbins

- Author: Tom Robbins
- Language: English
- Genre: Anthology
- Publisher: Bantam Books
- Publication date: 2005
- Publication place: United States
- Media type: Print (Hardcover & Paperback)
- Pages: 255 pp
- ISBN: 0-553-80451-0
- OCLC: 59401698
- Dewey Decimal: 818/.54 22
- LC Class: PS3568.O233 W55 2005

Wild Ducks Flying Backward: The Short Writings of Tom Robbins is a book by Tom Robbins, published in 2005 by Bantam Books. This collection of poems, short stories, essays, reviews, and other brief writings span almost 40 years of Robbins' career. The stories were collected from his work in magazines such as Esquire, Playboy, The New York Times, and elsewhere.

== Table of Contents ==
Periodical and date of first publication indicated where applicable, provided in Wild Ducks Flying Backwards. TRAVEL ARTICLES

- "Canyon of the Vaginas" (Esquire, 1988)
- "Two in the Bush" (Esquire, 1990)
- "The Eight-Story Kiss" (National Geographic Traveler, 2000)
- "The Cannibal King Wants His Din-Din" (The New York Times Magazine, 1986)
- "The Day the Earth Spit Warthogs" (Esquire, 1985)

TRIBUTES

- "The Doors" (The Helix, 1966)
- "Nurse Duffy of MTV" (Esquire, 1992)
- "Joseph Campbell" (Seattle Weekly, 1988)
- "Nadja Salerno-Sonnenberg" (Esquire, 1989)
- "The Genius Waitress" (Playboy, 1991)
- "Ray Kroc" (Esquire, 1983)
- "Jennifer Jason Leigh" (Esquire, 1994)
- "Leonard Cohen" (Liner notes to Tower of Song, 1995)
- "Slipper Sipping" (Bergdoff Goodman, 1999)
- "Redheads" (GQ, 1988)
- "Alan Rudolph" (Writers on Directors, Watson-Guptill, 1999)
- "Miniskirt Feminism" (New York Times, 1995)
- "The Sixties"
- "Diane Keaton" (Esquire, 1987)
- "Kissing" (Playboy, 1990)
- "Shree Bhagwan Rajneesh" (Introduction to Bhagwan: The Most Godless Yet the Most Godly of Men (1987)
- "Ruby Montana" (House & Garden, 1991)
- "Terrence McKenna" (Forward to The Archaic Revival, HarperCollins, 1992)
- "Thomas Pynchon" (Bookforum, 2005)
- "Debra Winger" (Esquire, 1993)

STORIES, POEMS, & LYRICS

- "Triplets"
- "Dream of the Language Wheel"
- "Catch 28"
- "Three Haiku"
- "Midnight Whoopee Cushion Sonata"
- "The Origin of Cigars"
- "Stick Indians"
- Home Medicine"
- "Clair de Lune"
- "Aloha Nui"
- Are You Ready For the New Urban Fragrances?"
- "Honky-Tonk Astronaut"
- Creole Debutante"
- "Master Bo Ling"
- "R.S.V.P."
- "My Heart Is Not a Poodle"
- "West to Satori"
- "Wild Card"
- "Open Wide"
- "Two for My Young Son"
- "The Towers of St. Ignatz: A script treatment for a feature film" (Ergo!, 1990)

MUSINGS & CRITIQUES

- "In Defiance of Gravity" (Harper's Magazine, 2004)
- "Till Lunch Do Us Part"
- What Is Art and If We Know What Art Is, What is Politics?"
- "Morris Louis: Empty and Full" (Art Forum, September 1967)
- "Lost in Translation"
- "Leo Kenney and the Geometry of Dreaming" (Seattle Art Museum, 1973)
- "The Desire of His Object" (Tacoma Art Museum, 1997)

RESPONSES

- "Write About One of Your Favorite Things" (Requested by Esquire, 1996)
- "How Do You Feel About America?" (Anthem, Avon Books, 1997)
- "What Do You Think Writers Block Is and Have You Ever Had It?" (Asked by New York Times, 2002)
- "With What Fictional Character Do You Most Identify"
- "Is the Writer Obligated to Use His/Her Medium as an Instrument for Social Betterment?" (Asked by Fiction International, 1984)
- "Why Do You Live Where You Live" (Asked by editors of Edgewalking on the Western Rim, Sasquatch Books, 1994)
- "Do You Express Your Personal Political Opinions in Your Novels?" (Elliott Bay Book Company newsletter, 2003)
- "What Was Your First Outdoor Adventure" (Asked by Trip, 1989)
- "How Would You Evaluate John Steinbeck?" (Asked by The Center For Steinbeck Studies, San Jose State University, 2002.
- "Tell Us About Your Favorite Car" (Asked by Road & Track, June 1987)
- "What Is Your Favorite Place in Nature?" (Asked by LIFE, 1987)
- "Send Us A Souvenir From the Road" (Black Book, 2002)
- "What is the Function of Metaphor?" (Asked by Inside Borders, 2003)
- "Are You a Realist?" (Asked by Contemporary Literature, 2001
- 'What is the Meaning of Life?" (Asked by LIFE magazine, 1987)

== Reception ==
Kirkus Reviews regards the collection as too much of a good thing: [E]ven just a little bit of Robbins can be too much, and the proof is in this collection of short fiction," The review dismisses the poetry selections, and faults the author for "trying too hard" to impress his readership.

Critic Mary Brennan at the Seattle Times, describing the collection as a "farrago," laments that "there are pieces that have not aged well." Nonetheless, Robbin's manages to convey "joie de vivre" in a number of works including "The Day the Earth Spit Warthogs."

== Sources ==
- Brennan, Mary. 2005. "Wild Ducks Flying Backward": A grab bag of Tom Robbins' writing. Seattle Times, September 9, 2005. https://www.seattletimes.com/entertainment/books/wild-ducks-flying-backward-a-grab-bag-of-tom-robbins-writing/ Accessed 2 January 2026.
- Robbins, Tom. 2005. Wild Ducks Flying Backward: The Short Writings of Tom Robbins. Bantam Books, New York. ISBN 0-553-38353-1
