= Hannah's Gift =

Hannah's Gift is a book title used by more than one author:

- Hanna's Gift, by Thomas Eidson (1998)
- Hannah's Gift - Lessons From a Life Fully Lived, a non-fiction book by Maria Housden (2002)
