= Heroes (Johnny Cash and Waylon Jennings album) =

Studio album by Johnny Cash and Waylon Jennings
- Released: May 19, 1986
- Recorded: December 4, 1984–May 23, 1985
- Studios: Chips Moman's Recording Studio, Nashville, Tennessee
- Genres: Country; outlaw country
- Length: 30:30
- Label: Columbia
- Producer: Chips Moman

Johnny Cash chronology
Rainbow (1985)	Heroes (1986)	Class of '55: Memphis Rock & Roll Homecoming (1986)

Waylon Jennings chronology
Will the Wolf Survive (1986)	Heroes (1986)	The Best of Waylon (1986)

Singles from Heroes
- 1. "Even Cowgirls Get the Blues" Released: 1986; 2. "The Ballad of Forty Dollars" Released: 1986

Professional ratings
Review scores
Source	Rating
AllMusic	4/5 stars

Heroes is the only collaborative studio album by American country music singers Johnny Cash (his 72nd overall album release) and Waylon Jennings, released on Columbia Records in 1986 (see 1986 in music).

== Track listing ==
No.	Title	Writer(s)	Length
1.	"Folks Out on the Road"	Frank J. Myers, Eddy Raven, David Powelson	2:47
2.	"I'm Never Gonna Roam Again"	Rodney Crowell	2:56
3.	"American by Birth"	Roger Alan Wade	2:33
4.	"Field of Diamonds"	Johnny Cash, Jack Wesley Routh	2:37
5.	"Heroes"	Jennifer Kimball, Thomas Kimmel	4:16
6.	"Even Cowgirls Get the Blues"	Crowell	3:03
7.	"Love Is the Way"	Kris Kristofferson	2:31
8.	"Ballad of Forty Dollars"	Tom T. Hall	3:11
9.	"I'll Always Love You (in My Own Crazy Way)"	Frankie Miller, Troy Seals, Eddie Setser	3:58
10.	"One Too Many Mornings"	Bob Dylan	2:38

== Personnel ==
- Johnny Cash - vocals, guitar
- Waylon Jennings - vocals, guitar
- Rick Yancey, Danny Hogan - backing vocals
- Al Casey, James B. Cobb Jr., Jerry Shook, Reggie Young - guitar
- Marty Stuart - guitar, mandolin
- Ralph Mooney - steel guitar
- Larry Butler, Bobby Emmons, Bobby Wood - keyboards
- Gene Chrisman - drums
- Jimmy Tittle - bass
- Mike Leech - bass, arranger
- The A-Strings - strings
- Ace Cannon, Dennis Good, Wayne Jackson - horns
- Mickey Raphael - harp

=== Additional personnel ===
- Chips Moman - producer, engineer
- David Cherry - engineer
- Steve Hoffman - mastering
- Bill Johnson - art director
- Mike Ragogna - reissue director
- Murray Brenman - reissue design
- Kevin Gray - CD preparation
- Kal Roberts - photography

== Charts ==
Album - Billboard (United States)

Chart (1986)	Peak position
Top Country Albums	13

Singles - Billboard (United States)

Year	Single	Peak positions	
Year	Single	US Country	CAN Country
1986	"Even Cowgirls Get the Blues"	35	40
1986	"The Ballad of Forty Dollars"	—	50
