= Fierce Invalids Home from Hot Climates =

Novel by Tom Robbins

Fierce Invalids Home From Hot Climates
- Author: Tom Robbins
- Language: English
- Publication date: 5 September 2000
- Media type: Print (Hardcover and Paperback)
- Pages: 415 pp
- ISBN: 0-553-10775-5
- OCLC: 42619813
- Dewey Decimal: 813/.54 21
- LC Class: PS3568.O233 F54 2000

Fierce Invalids Home From Hot Climates is Tom Robbins' seventh work; the novel was first published in 2000 by the Random House Publishing Group.

== Synopsis ==
Invalids follow Switters, a 35-year-old CIA agent on his journey as a wheelchair-using intelligence officer. Switters experiences love and danger across several continents. Robbins "explores, challenges, mocks, and celebrates virtually every major aspect of our mercurial era."(Quote from the hardcover book jacket.)

Robbins has stated in numerous interviews that in this book he was trying to deal with contradiction, but rather than avoiding his contradictory nature, his character embraces it. He's a CIA agent but despises the government. He's a pacifist but carries a gun. He's as much in love with his 17-year-old stepsister as he is with a 46-year-old nun.

Switters feels that the core of the universe and the basis of human existence is the paradox of light and dark coexisting together. One is not separate from the other; they just co-exist. This is the main idea of "Fierce Invalids Home from Hot Climates", along with an interest in the Lady of Fatima and a squawking parrot. The title of the novel comes from Arthur Rimbaud's A Season in Hell, in which he daydreams about becoming one of "ces féroces infirmes retour des pays chauds."

== Characters ==
=== Switters ===
Switters grew up in the Seattle area and was raised primarily by his grandmother, Maestra. His parents separated when he was young. His mother remarried and has a stepsister named Suzy.

When we first meet Switters he is 35 years old. He just came back from a mission and visited his grandmother Maestra in Seattle. He is attached to her although she does not tolerate his mannerism. He does anything she asks of him, which is how he ends up in, as he puts it, "South too-damn-vivid America."

Switters refrains from the more tedious routines of modern life, which he calls collectively "maintenance" - showering, shaving, primping of any kind, and though he has quite an appetite, especially for red-eye gravy, he can't abide to think of the process of excretion. He does not visualize his internal organs, nor their processes. Instead, he envisions his viscera as more of a white ball of healing light. While this may smack of New-Age mysticism, Switters himself is aware of his own self-deception while at the same time reveling in it.

As presumably does any other member of a national intelligence office, Switters has a few secrets. His most private was his love of show tunes. In the crocodile-skin valise in which he keeps his laptop and his gun, he also has, in a secret compartment, a CD of Broadway tunes, which he listens to in both his darkest and most joyous moments. He is heard - or overheard - singing lines from one of Stephen Sondheim's most famous songs—"Send in the Clowns".

His primary character trait is his obsession with innocence. He is willing to accept anything that anyone does, so long as it is pure - comes from that person's own experience and beliefs, as opposed to simply following orders, instructions, or creed. He cares little for the practice of religion, perceiving it as corrupt, but has studied the Bible, Qur'an, and various mythologies. The exception to this is Zen, which he practices vaguely for the most part, though he does practice zazen.

Like many obsessions, his drive for innocence and purity spills over into his love life. Throughout the novel, he carries on a very flirtatious - and occasionally salacious - email dialog with his 16-year-old stepsister Suzy. After his visit to South America, he spends some time convalescing in Sacramento at his mother's house, a setting that puts him in dangerously close proximity to the object of his affection, who despite a bit of hesitation, returns her paramour's attention.

Later in the novel, Switters falls in love with a 46-year-old nun, who despite her age, Switters finds just as pure as young Suzy.

=== Bobby Case ===
Switters' best friend whom he worked within the CIA in Thailand and also shares an attraction to underage girls.

=== Sailor Boy ===
The parrot that Switter must release in "too god damn vivid South America".

=== Maestra ===
Switters' Grandmother. Although she would never let him call her that.

=== Suzy ===
Switters' sixteen-year-old stepsister lives in Sacramento, California, US. She later lives with Maestra who resides in Seattle Washington, US. Switters falls in love with Suzy, due to his "attraction to innocence."

=== Sister "Domino" Thiry ===
The nun in a Syrian Catholic convent with whom Switters falls in love.

=== The Masked Beauty ===
The abbess of the oasis-based, disavowed Catholic convent in which Switters comes to stay for over a year later in the book.

=== The shaman ===
"Today Is Tomorrow" is a shaman who casts a curse on Switters. Alternately, he is called "The End of Time" in the beginning of the book, due to a mistranslation of the native language.
