= Gary Lippman =

American author

- Born: August 8, 1963; Summit, New Jersey, U.S
- Occupations: Author, film producer, attorney

Gary Lippman (born August 8, 1963) is an American author, journalist, attorney, and film producer. Lippman's journalistic work has been published in The New York Times, The Paris Review, Vice, Los Angeles Review of Books, LitHub and more. He is the author of two novels, Set the Controls for the Heart of Sharon Tate and I Wish, Therefore I Am, along with a collection of microfiction titled We Loved The World But Could Not Stay, all published by Rare Bird Books. In 2012, he co-produced the film Vinyl.

== Early life and education ==
Lippman received his B.A. in English literature from Rutgers University in 1986, his J.D. from the Northwestern University Pritzker School of Law in 1990 and has worked with New York's Innocence Project.

== Writing career ==
Lippman's journalistic writing includes social commentary, book reviews, interviews, and profiles of prominent cultural figures such as Daniel Menaker, John Perry Barlow and Lou Reed. His friendships with authors Harry Eugene Crews and Tom Robbins have also been celebrated in his pieces.

Lippman's play Paradox Lust ran in an off-Broadway theatre in 2001. His novel Set the Controls for the Heart of Sharon Tate won praise from The Sopranos actor Michael Imperioli, and writers Jillian Lauren, Lydia Lunch, and Laura Albert. His We Loved The World But Could Not Stay and I Wish, Therefore I Am have been celebrated by literary figures such as Tom Robbins, Patricia Marx, Joan Juliet Buck, actors Lorraine Bracco and Matthew Rhys, and musicians such as Eugene Hutz and Simon Kirke.

== Writings ==
=== Journalism ===
- "Pynchonicity," The Paris Review, September 5, 2013.
- "Even A Bouncer Can Cry," The New York Times City Room Blog, April 20, 2014.
- "An Elderly Litterbug," The New York Times City Room Blog, January 22, 2015.
- "Searching for Sharon Tate," Literary Hub, Crime Reads, August 9, 2019.
- "Now’s The Time: An Interview with David Amram," The Paris Review, December 19, 2019.
- "Letter To A First Time Thomas Pynchon Reader," Please Kill Me, 2020.
- "Tom Robbins on Personalizing the Editorial Process and Knowing When to End a Novel," Literary Hub, June 30, 2021

=== Feature Profiles ===
- "A Singular Gentleman Goes Out Biting," The Paris Review, April 25, 2012.
- "Living, Learning, and Going Long with Gypsy Boots, America’s First Hippie," Vice, March 13, 2013.
- "Beyond the Call: A Memory of Lou Reed," Vice, November 8, 2013.
- "That’s Material: An Interview with Daniel Menaker," The Paris Review, January 21, 2014.
- "Amusing Myself: An Interview with Bob Neuwirth," The Paris Review, October 6, 2014.
- "Remembering My Day with Lemmy Kilmister," Vice, December 21, 2015.
- "Life and Acting: Catching Up with Jack Garfein," The Paris Review, February 9, 2016.
- "Evil, ‘Venerable,’ and Otherwise: An Interview with Barbet Schroeder," The Paris Review, November 2, 2017.
- "A Space Cowboy’s Curriculum," The Paris Review, June 21, 2018.
- "Entering Freak City: Hanging Out with Harry Crews," Please Kill Me, October 21, 2019.
- "The End of The Game: Remembering Peter Beard," Please Kill Me, April 27, 2020
- "My Favorite Alchemist: An Homage to Hal Willner," Please Kill Me, September 10, 2020
- "The Syrup of Wahoo Keeps Splashing Around," Los Angeles Review of Books, March 4, 2025
- "Arts Remembrance: Tom Robbins’s ‘Joy in Spite of Everything'" The Arts Fuse, March 5, 2025

=== Fiction ===
- Set the Controls for the Heart of Sharon Tate, 2019, Rare Bird Books, ISBN 978-1644280263
- We Loved The World But Could Not Stay, 2022, Rare Bird Books, ISBN 978-1644282519
- I Wish, Therefore I Am, 2025, Rare Bird Books, ISBN 978-1644285145
