= Walter B. Pitkin Jr. =

American writer and literary agent (1913–2007)

Walter Boughton Pitkin (June 29, 1913 – June 27, 2007) was an American publisher, author, and literary agent.

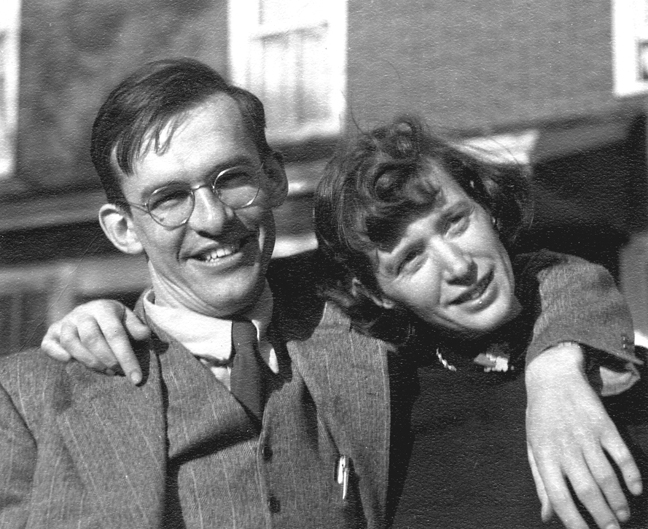
Walter Boughton Pitkin Jr. and Susan Kobbe Pitkin

== Biography ==
Pitkin was born and raised in Dover, New Jersey in what was then a rural area. He was the youngest son of Walter B. Pitkin and Mary (Gray) Pitkin. He was the youngest of 5 brothers. Because he suffered from asthma since early childhood, Pitkin was not able to attend school. He did not learn to read until age 10. At about age 20, he rented a room in Manhattan, near Columbia University, where his father was a professor in the School of Journalism. During this period he studied on his own to meet the entrance requirements for Columbia College. He read English literature, American and European history, learned geometry, algebra, German and French. He entered Columbia College in 1934. The renowned professor Mark Van Doren was a great inspiration, as were the historian Harry J. Carman, and the poet and philosopher, Irwin Edman. Thomas Merton was a friend, fellow English major, and classmate.

Pitkin graduated from Columbia College in 1938 Phi Beta Kappa and began a career in publishing. Along with Ian Ballantine, he worked for Penguin America, until World War II made trans-Atlantic trade nearly impossible. Considered a pioneer in American paperback publishing, Pitkin co-founded Bantam Books in 1945 with Betty and Ian Ballantine and Sidney B. Kramer. Pitkin was Editor-in-Chief and also Executive Vice-president of Bantam. He later worked for New American Library.

In 1940, Pitkin married Susan Kobbe and, in 1949, moved to Westport, Connecticut. The couple raised three children there: Ann, John, and Stephen. After 12 years in Westport, they moved to Weston, Connecticut.

Pitkin was the author of two published books: Life Begins at Fifty and What's That Plane?, a book widely used during World War II to assist American troops in identifying Allied and Axis aircraft. The book was one of the first American Penguin Specials and was written while Pitkin was an editor for Penguin in New York City. The book contains both photographs and drawings of American, British, Japanese, and German planes. Some of the drawings were executed by Susan Pitkin, who worked from images provided from a variety of sources, including the British Information Service and mainstream Japanese publications that ran images of American planes. Ian Ballantine designed the cover. The book was purchased in large numbers by the U.S. Army.

In the 1960s, Pitkin founded the Map & Book Store on Main Street in Westport, Connecticut. The Map & Book Store later became the Remarkable Book Shop, owned and run by Esther Kramer, wife of Pitkin's fellow founder of Bantam Books, Sidney B. Kramer. The Remarkable Bookshop was a conspicuous presence in Westport for decades, sporting a pink exterior and a whimsical sign, signature design choices of the "remarkable" Esther. In the 1970s and 1980s, Pitkin worked as a literary agent, helping to publish the works of Tom Parker, among others. A lifelong Democrat, Pitkin was chairman of the Westport Democratic Town Committee and an active supporter of Democratic causes. Pitkin died two days before his 94th birthday.
