= I Love What Love Is Doing to Me =

Single by Lynn Anderson

from the album I Love What Love Is Doing to Me/He Ain't You
- B-side: "Will I Ever Hear Those Church Bells Ring?"
- Released: May 1977
- Recorded: April 1977
- Studio: Columbia Studio
- Genre: Country; Countrypolitan
- Length: 2:10
- Label: Columbia
- Songwriter: Johnny Cunningham
- Producers: Steve Gibson; Glenn Sutton

Lynn Anderson singles chronology
"Wrap Your Love All Around Your Man" (1977)	"I Love What Love Is Doing to Me" (1977)	"He Ain't You" (1977)

"I Love What Love Is Doing to Me" is a song written by Johnny Cunningham. It was recorded by American country music artist Lynn Anderson and released as a single in 1977 via Columbia Records, becoming a top 40 hit that year.

== Background and release ==
"I Love What Love Is Doing to Me" was recorded in April 1977 at the Columbia Studio, located in Nashville, Tennessee. The sessions were produced by Glenn Sutton, Anderson's longtime production collaborator at the label and her first husband. It was co-produced by Steve Gibson, making the session Anderson's first experience under the co-production of Gibson. Nine additional tracks were recorded at this particular session, including the major hit "He Ain't You."

"I Love What Love Is Doing to Me" was released as a single in May 1977 via Columbia Records. The song spent ten weeks on the Billboard Hot Country Singles chart before reaching number 22 in July 1977. The song was issued on Anderson's 1977 studio album I Love What Love Is Doing to Me/He Ain't You.

== Track listings ==
7" vinyl single

- "I Love What Love Is Doing to Me" – 2:10
- "Will I Ever Hear Those Churchbells Ring?" – 3:32

== Chart performance ==
Chart (1977)	Peak position
US Hot Country Songs (Billboard)	22
