= From the Inside (Lynn Anderson album) =

Studio album by Lynn Anderson
- Released: 1978
- Recorded: 1978
- Genre: Country pop
- Label: Columbia
- Producer: Steve Gibson

Lynn Anderson chronology
I Love What Love is Doin' to Me (1977)	From the Inside (1978)	Outlaw Is Just a State of Mind (1979)

From the Inside is a studio album by country music singer Lynn Anderson, released in 1978. Although well-reviewed in Stereo Review and other publications, the album proved to be the least successful of her career at Columbia Records and her only album for the label not to make the Billboard Country Albums chart. The two single releases from it also performed below standard for Anderson, "Rising Above It All" and "Last Love of My Life", each of them peaking in the back ten slots of the Hot Country Singles Top 50

One of the highlights from this album was a cover version of Ava Barber's Top 15 hit from that year, "Bucket to the South". "When You Marry For Money" was the last song written by Anderson's mother Liz Anderson that Anderson recorded during her years on major record labels, 1966-1989.

== Track listing ==
1. "Rising Above It All"
2. "Touch and Go"
3. "Bucket to the South"
4. "Sometimes When We Touch"
5. "From the Inside"
6. "I Know You're the Rain"
7. "Fairytale"
8. "When You Marry for Money"
9. "Love Me Back"
10. "Last Love of My Life"
