= Skinny Legs and All (novel) =

1990 novel by Tom Robbins

- First edition (hardcover)
- Author: Tom Robbins
- Language: English
- Genre: Postmodernism
- Publisher: Bantam Books
- Publication date: 1990
- Publication place: United States
- Media type: Print (hardback & paperback)
- Pages: 422 pp
- ISBN: 0-553-05775-8
- OCLC: 20669779
- Dewey Decimal: 813/.54 20
- LC Class: PS3568.O233 S55 1990

Skinny Legs and All, novelist Tom Robbins's fifth book, was published in 1990 by Bantam Books. As with all of Robbins's novels, it weaves disparate and seemingly unrelated themes into a single narrative.

== Plot introduction ==
The opening scene of Skinny Legs finds newlyweds Ellen Cherry Charles and Randolph "Boomer" Petway III driving cross-country in an Airstream that has been welded into the shape of a giant turkey by Cherry's fiancé, Boomer. During her journey to seek freedom as an artist, Cherry loses precious objects and observes Boomer attain greater artistic recognition. Through a metaphorical belly dancer, Skinny Legs and All confronts the veils of society, and the pain, pleasure and freedom derived as they are lifted. Irony, opposites and parallels, in relationships, art, artists, sex, politics and religion expose the danger of deeper issues in humanity; regarding outmoded gender and cultural roles and rituals, insecurity, guilt, indulgence, gluttony, occultism, war, violence, hypocrisy, greed, and psychosis.

The reader is introduced to an array of off-beat and exciting characters, including the estranged couple of artist/waitress Ellen Cherry and welder/accidental artist Randolph "Boomer" Petway; Spike Cohen and Roland Abu Hadee (a Jew and an Arab who co-own a Middle-Eastern restaurant across from the UN building in New York); fundamentalist preacher Buddy Winkler; a doe-eyed belly dancer named Salome; Detective Jackie Shaftoe; Raoul Ritz, the libidinous doorman turned rock star; pretentious art gallery owner Ultima Sommerville; a mysterious performance artist known as Turn Around Norman; and Verlin and Patsy Charles, Ellen Cherry's parents. A host of inanimate objects (Can o' Beans, Dirty Sock, Spoon, Painted Stick and Conch Shell) also play a key role in the novel, and even biblical "harlot" Jezebel and Dan Quayle make cameo appearances.

== Trivia ==
- Australian rock band Wolfmother conceived of its name from the novel.
- Ellen Cherry Charles was a minor character in Robbins's previous novel, Jitterbug Perfume.
- "Skinny Legs and All" is a 1967 song by Joe Tex.

== Release details ==
- First edition, Hardcover - ISBN 0-553-05775-8, published on April 1, 1990 by Bantam Books
- First Paperback edition - ISBN 0-553-28969-1, published on ?, 1990 by Bantam Books
