= The Christmas Album (Lynn Anderson album) =

- CD reissue cover

Studio album by Lynn Anderson
- Released: 1971
- Recorded: 1971
- Genres: Christmas, country, pop
- Label: Columbia
- Producers: Glenn Sutton, Clive Davis

Lynn Anderson chronology
How Can I Unlove You (1971)	The Christmas Album (1971)	The World of Lynn Anderson (1971)

Professional ratings
Review scores
Source	Rating
Allmusic	Link

The Christmas Album is a holiday music album by country music singer Lynn Anderson released in 1971.

This was Lynn Anderson's first Christmas music album. The album was released by Columbia Records, and was very successful. The album reached No. 13 on Billboard's Best Bets For Christmas album chart in 1971.

The album, a mix of secular uptempo Christmas classics and new songs from several of the leading Nashville country music songwriters of the day was enormously popular and became a Christmas classic itself among country music and American popular music fans. The album's opening song "Ding-A-Ling the Christmas Bell" was released as a single and at one point considered as a possible Christmas cartoon special but the project never got off the ground.

The album was in print for a decade and, in the 1990s, Sony released limited quantities on CD with new cover art (the image shown above). In 2015 it was reissued on CD by the Real Gone Music label, with alternate charity single mixes of four songs (in mono and with spoken-word intros) included as bonus tracks.

Anderson would release a second Christmas album, Home for the Holidays, in 2002.

== Track listing ==
1. "Ding-a-Ling the Christmas Bell" (Jerry Foster, Bill Rice)
2. "Jingle Bell Rock" (Joe Beale, Jim Boothe)
3. "The Spirit of Christmas" (Liz Anderson)
4. "Rudolph the Red-Nosed Reindeer" (Johnny Marks)
5. "Soon It Will Be Christmas Day" (Ben Peters)
6. "I Saw Mommy Kissing Santa Claus"
7. "Rockin' Around the Christmas Tree" (Johnny Marks)
8. "Mr. Mistletoe" (Ben Peters)
9. "A Whistle and a Whisker Away" (Bill Hayes, Lee Hayes)
10. "Frosty the Snowman" (Walter "Jack" Rollins, Steve Nelson)
11. "Don't Wish Me Merry Christmas" (Glenn Sutton)
