= Outlaw Is Just a State of Mind =

Outlaw is Just a State of Mind

Studio album by Lynn Anderson
- Released: 1979
- Recorded: 1979
- Genre: Country pop
- Label: Columbia
- Producer: David Wolfert

Lynn Anderson chronology
I Love What Love is Doin to Me (1978)	Outlaw is Just a State of Mind (1979)	Even Cowgirls Get the Blues (1980)

Outlaw Is Just a State of Mind is the name of the 25th studio album by American country music singer Lynn Anderson, released in 1979.

This was one of Lynn Anderson's last albums with Columbia, her label for the previous decade. It was her first album with David Wolfert as producer. It spawned three successful Top 40 hits for Anderson on country radio. The first single released in early 1979 titled "Isn't It Always Love" reached No. 10 on the country singles charts, making this Anderson's first Top 10 hit in five years (she hadn't reached the Top 10 since 1974 with her No. 1 single, "What a Man My Man Is"). The second single, "I Love How You Love Me", was a successful Top 20 country hit at No. 18. The third and final single released from the album, titled "Sea of Heartbreak" (a remake of the Don Gibson hit), reached No. 33. The album was a relative commercial success, reaching No. 29 on the "Top Country Albums" chart in 1979.

Outlaw Is Just a State of Mind is sometimes called Anderson's comeback album since it spawned her first Top 10 hit in a long time. Although the Outlaw theme was very popular at the time, none of the album's music reflected the Outlaw country theme. The album's cover was one of the few things that reflected an Outlaw theme in the album, featuring Anderson wearing a fur coat, while holding a silver-colored gun. Instead, the songs sounded more Country-pop, a version of country music that was also very popular at the time, giving country songs a more pop-edged sound it, by adding orchestral instruments and over-produced sound. Anderson's singles, especially "Isn't It Always Love", reflected this theme.

== Track listing ==
1. "Isn't It Always Love" (Karla Bonoff) - 2:55
2. "I Love How You Love Me" (Larry Kolber, Barry Mann) - 3:14
3. "Child With You Tonight" (Susan Sheridan, David Wolfert) - 2:44
4. "This Night Won't Last Forever" (Roy Freeland, Bill LaBounty) - 4:14
5. "I Am Alone" (Aaron Gordon) - 3:41
6. "Say You Will" (Steve Nelson, David Wolfert) - 3:05
7. "Outlaw Is Just a State of Mind" (Susan Sheridan, David Wolfert) - 4:49
8. "Come as You Are" (Laura Allan) - 3:12
9. "Come Running" (Van Morrison) - 2:14
10. "Sea of Heartbreak" (Hal David, Paul Hampton) - 3:31
