= Another Roadside Attraction =

1971 novel by Tom Robbins

- First edition
- Author: Tom Robbins
- Language: English
- Publisher: Doubleday
- Publication date: 1971
- Publication place: United States
- Media type: Print (Hardcover & Paperback)
- Pages: 400 pp
- ISBN: 0-553-34948-1
- OCLC: 21029688
- Dewey Decimal: 813/.54 22
- LC Class: PS3568.O233 A83 2003

Another Roadside Attraction is the first novel by Tom Robbins, published in 1971.

== Plot ==
The novel is framed as a series of short entries rather than chapters. The writer, who remains anonymous at first, is being held captive by several agencies along with Amanda Ziller, the main subject of his report. Amanda was a member of a traveling circus that one day recruited the eccentric drummer John Paul Ziller, a once famous musician known for his exotic dress and odd mannerisms. Falling immediately in love, the two soon married and resigned from the troupe to live in an abandoned restaurant in Skagit County, Washington. John brings Mon Cul, his pet baboon, to stay with them. Amanda brings her toddler son, Thor. The couple decide to revive the restaurant as a hot dog stand and roadside zoo. Although they are both averse to keeping animals captive, they compromise by keeping a group of garter snakes native to San Francisco under the grounds of preservation, as well as a flea circus under the grounds that bugs are not technically animals. Also part of the zoo is a tsetse fly encased in amber.

As the hot dog stand gains traction, a man who goes by the name of Marx Marvelous gets himself arrested for sneaking into a zoo and attempting to set a baboon free, which he reveals to have done because he knew it would attract the Zillers' attention. The couple bail him out of jail and hire him to help manage the restaurant. A man of science, Marvelous reveals to Amanda that he believes Christianity is on the verge of collapse and will soon transition to a new religion, with the Zillers playing some sort of key role.

During this time, the trio intermittently receive letters from John Paul's friend Plucky Purcell, who explains that he has accidentally infiltrated a secret organization of Catholic assassins known as the Order of the Felicitate, which he accomplished by assuming the identity of a deceased monk he had stumbled upon. After spending several months at the monastery, he travels with the organization to the Vatican City, where an unexpected earthquake damages the catacombs in which he slept and inadvertently reveals the corpse of Jesus Christ, which had until then been stored underground in a sealed vault. Purcell takes advantage of the sudden chaos to sneak out of the city with the Corpse. He manages to ship it back to the Zillers' restaurant, arriving there himself shortly after.

The group spends several days pondering what to do with the Corpse. Purcell wishes to reveal it to the world, thus causing the collapse of Christianity and likely a large part of society as a whole. Marvelous wishes to blackmail high-ranking church and government officials in order to influence them to do more good in the world. Amanda wishes to give it a proper burial on Bow Wow mountain and nothing more. John Paul remains silent.

After taking a day to think separately about the issue, the group reconvenes to discover that the Felicitate, along with other government officials, have begun to close in on the restaurant. The following morning, Marx - who reveals himself as the writer - awakens to discover that Purcell and John Paul have fled, taking Mon Cul and the Corpse with them. While searching for clues, Marx and Amanda find a newspaper clipping which details the launch of a large weather balloon which would take a group of five baboons to the edge of space. Shortly thereafter, a government agent shows a report to the two which reveals that Purcell and John Paul had sneaked onto the base carrying the balloon and had set the baboons free. Purcell was shot and killed while trying to flee, but John Paul, Mon Cul, and the Corpse all boarded the balloon and took off. The report concludes by saying that John Paul faced certain death within 24 hours due to the extreme exposure from the sun, after which his body, along with Mon Cul's and the Corpse's, would eventually disintegrate entirely.

Soon after, Amanda and Marx prepare to leave the restaurant. Amanda, now pregnant once more, leaves for unknown adventures, while Marvelous is taken by the head of the Felicitate to an unknown fate. Marx's report concludes by saying he has given his entire manuscript to Amanda, and thus if it has survived the ordeal then it means Amanda is still alive.

== Technique and subject matter ==
In this novel, the author uses nonlinear plot progression, sometimes in the tone of a first-person diary, to express his views on religion and other topics.

A major theme of the novel is the mummified corpse of Jesus Christ and Western Civilization's belief and faith in the divinity of Jesus Christ. In his memoir, Robbins states that he wanted to question what would happen to Western Civilization if it could be demonstrated that Jesus had not in fact risen bodily from the dead.

== Development history ==
In 1966, Doubleday's West Coast Editor Luthor Nichols contacted Robbins to ask him to write a book on Northwest Art. Instead, Robbins told Nichols he wanted to write a novel and pitched the idea of what was to become Another Roadside Attraction.

In 1967, Robbins mailed off 30 pages of his novel to Nichols who sent them on to the New York office. The senior editors, holdovers from when Doubleday was a Roman Catholic publishing house, did not approve, but Nichols encouraged Robbins to keep writing. When he had 70 pages, Nichols tried them again on New York, but the senior editors were still unconvinced. It wasn't until 1970 that Doubleday finally accepted the manuscript and in 1971 published 6,000 copies of Another Roadside Attraction.

In his memoir, Robbins states that he did not want to describe the 1960s in this novel but to re-create them on the page, "to mirror in style as well as content their mood, their palette, their extremes, their vibrations, their profundity, their silliness and whimsy." Robbins also said he used a collage technique—he skimmed media such as the underground press, KRAB radio program guides, broadsides, fliers for concerts to try and pluck out items that might capture a portrait of the period.

In the book a baboon is stolen from the Woodland Park Zoo in Seattle. Shortly after publication someone did actually steal a baboon from the Zoo.

=== Publication history ===
- Robbins, Tom (1971). Another Roadside Attraction (Hardcover) (1st ed.). Doubleday. LCCN 73144292.
- Robbins, Tom (1972). Another Roadside Attraction (Paperback). Ballantine Books. ISBN 978-0-345-02770-2.
