= Rising Above It All =

Single by Lynn Anderson

from the album From the Inside
- B-side: "My World Begins and Ends With You"
- Released: April 1978
- Studio: Creative Workshop (Nashville, Tennessee)
- Genre: Country; Countrypolitan
- Length: 2:48
- Label: Columbia
- Songwriters: Jerry Foster; Bill Rice
- Producer: Steve Gibson

Lynn Anderson singles chronology
"We Got Love" (1978)	"Rising Above It All" (1978)	"Last Love of My Life" (1978)

"Rising Above It All" is a song written by Jerry Foster and Bill Rice. It was recorded by American country music artist Lynn Anderson and released as a single in 1978 via Columbia Records, becoming a top 40 hit that year.

== Background and release ==
"Rising Above It All" was recorded in January 1978 at the Creative Workshop, a studio located in Nashville, Tennessee. The session included nine additional tracks, all produced by Steve Gibson. Anderson had recently started working with Gibson after several years working with her first husband, Glenn Sutton.

"Rising Above It All" was released as a single in April 1978 via Columbia Records. The song spent nine weeks on the Billboard Hot Country Singles chart before only reaching number 44 in June 1978. In Canada, the song became a top 40 hit single, climbing to number 21 on the RPM Country Songs chart that year. The song was issued on Anderson's 1978 studio album of the From the Inside.

== Track listings ==
7" vinyl single

- "Rising Above It All" – 2:48
- "My World Begins and Ends with You" – 2:30

== Chart performance ==
Chart (1978)	Peak position
Canada Country Songs (RPM)	21
US Hot Country Songs (Billboard)	44
