= Tibetan Peach Pie =

2014 book by Tom Robbins

Tibetan Peach Pie : A True Account of an Imaginative Life
- Author: Tom Robbins
- Language: English
- Publisher: Ecco Press
- Publication date: 2014
- Publication place: United States
- Media type: Print (hardback & paperback)
- Pages: 362 pp
- ISBN: 9780062267405
- OCLC: 880351323

Tibetan Peach Pie: A True Account of an Imaginative Life is a self-declared "un-memoir" by Tom Robbins.

It is written in his characteristically imaginative style, and has received generally positive reviews.
