= Even Cowgirls Get the Blues (song) =

Song written by Rodney Crowell

"Even Cowgirls Get the Blues" is a song written by Rodney Crowell. American actress and singer Mary Kay Place recorded the first version of the song for her 1977 studio album Aimin' to Please, as the eighth track on the album. It has since been covered by several artists, notably by Emmylou Harris and Lynn Anderson. Crowell claimed to have written "Even Cowgirls Get the Blues" about Harris and her friend Susanna Clark. The title of the song was taken from the then-popular novel of the same name by author Tom Robbins. Crowell released his own version of the song in 1993.

== Lynn Anderson version ==
"Even Cowgirls Get the Blues"

Single by Lynn Anderson

from the album Even Cowgirls Get the Blues
- B-side: "See Through Me"
- Released: May 1980
- Genre: Country; countrypolitan
- Length: 2:57
- Label: Columbia
- Songwriter: Rodney Crowell
- Producers: Gary Klein; Charles Koppelman

Lynn Anderson singles chronology
"Sea of Heartbreak" (1980)	"Even Cowgirls Get the Blues" (1980)	"Blue Baby Blue" (1980)

"Even Cowgirls Get the Blues" was notably recorded by American country artist Lynn Anderson in 1980. It became a minor hit that year in North America. Anderson's version was recorded at the Columbia Studio in April 1980, located in Nashville, Tennessee. The session was produced by Gary Klein and Charles Koppelman, her first production assignment with the pair.

"Even Cowgirls Get the Blues" was first released as a single in May 1980. The song spent 13 weeks on the Billboard Hot Country Singles chart before reaching number 26 in September 1980. It also became a top 40 hit on the Canadian RPM Country Songs chart, reaching number 23 the same year. The song was issued on Anderson's 1980 studio album of the same name.

=== Track listing ===
7" vinyl single

- "Even Cowgirls Get the Blues" – 2:57
- "See Through Me" – 4:03

=== Chart performance ===
Chart (1980)	Peak position
Canada Country Songs (RPM)	23
US Hot Country Songs (Billboard)	26

== Other notable versions ==
After Mary Kay Place's version, "Even Cowgirls Get the Blues" was notably recorded by other music artists as well.

In 1979, it was featured as a track on American country singer Emmylou Harris' album Blue Kentucky Girl with vocal harmonies by Dolly Parton and Linda Ronstadt (initially recorded during the 1978 sessions for their Trio album). Harris' version was the tenth track on the project. An alternative version of this song with verses performed by Harris, Ronstadt and Parton later appeared on The Complete Trio Collection album (2016).

In 1986, the song appeared on the collaborative studio project by Johnny Cash and Waylon Jennings. The song was recorded as a duet between both artists and was the sixth track of their album Heroes. In 1993, Rodney Crowell's version was released as a single, but failed to chart. It was included on the compilation album Greatest Hits, as the second track on the compilation.
