= B Is for Beer =

Novel by Tom Robbins

- First edition
- Author: Tom Robbins
- Language: English
- Publisher: HarperCollins
- Publication date: 2009
- Publication place: United States
- Media type: Print (Hardcover & Paperback
- Pages: 128 pp
- ISBN: 0-06-168727-8
- Dewey Decimal: 813/.54 20
- LC Class: PS3568.O233 H35 1994

B is for Beer is a novella by Tom Robbins published in 2009 by HarperCollins. It is a children's book about Gracie Perkel, a young girl exploring the world of beer. She learns why every adult enjoys it and why she is not allowed to drink it.

== Musical adaptation ==
The book was subsequently adapted into a musical, "B Is for Beer: The Musical", co-written by Robbins and Ben Lee.

== Release details ==
- Hardcover – ISBN 0-06-168727-8 (ISBN 978-0-553-07625-7) published on April 21, 2009, by HarperCollins
- CD Audio Book - ISBN 0-06-171908-0 (ISBN 978-0-06171908-0) published on April 21, 2009, by HarperCollins
- E-Book – ISBN 0-06-176836-7 (ISBN 978-0-06176836-1) published on April 21, 2009, by HarperCollins
