= Sweet Talkin' Man =

Single by Lynn Anderson

from the album Wrap Your Love All Around Your Man
- B-side: "A Good Old Country Song"
- Released: September 1976
- Studio: Columbia Studio
- Genre: Country; Countrypolitan
- Length: 2:59
- Label: Columbia
- Songwriter: Johnny Cunningham
- Producer: Glenn Sutton

Lynn Anderson singles chronology
"Rodeo Cowboy" (1976)	"Sweet Talkin' Man" (1976)	"Wrap Your Love All Around Your Man" (1977)

"Sweet Talkin' Man" is a song written by Johnny Cunningham. It was recorded by American country music artist Lynn Anderson and released as a single in 1976 via Columbia Records, becoming a top 40 hit that year.

== Background and release ==
"Sweet Talkin' Man" was recorded in August 1976 at the Columbia Studio, located in Nashville, Tennessee. The session was produced by Glenn Sutton, Anderson's longtime production collaborator at the label and her first husband. It was the only song recorded during this particular session date.

"Sweet Talkin' Man" was released as a single in September 1976 via Columbia Records. The song spent 11 weeks on the Billboard Hot Country Singles chart before reaching number 23 in November 1977. It reached a similar position on the Canadian RPM Country Songs chart, peaking at number 27 the same year. The song was issued on Anderson's 1977 studio album 'Wrap Your Love All Around Your Man.

== Track listings ==
7" vinyl single

- "Sweet Talkin' Man" – 2:59
- "A Good Old Country Song" – 2:13

== Chart performance ==
Chart (1976)	Peak position
Canada Country Songs (RPM)	27
US Hot Country Songs (Billboard)	23
