= Ballad of Forty Dollars =

Single by Tom T. Hall

from the album Ballad of Forty Dollars and His Other Great Songs
- B-side: "Highways"
- Released: October 28, 1968
- Recorded: September 1, 1968; Columbia Studio, Nashville, Tennessee
- Genre: Country
- Length: 3:09
- Label: Mercury 72863
- Songwriter: Tom T. Hall
- Producer: Jerry Kennedy

Tom T. Hall singles chronology
"I Ain't Got the Time" (1968)	"Ballad of Forty Dollars" (1968)	"Strawberry Farms" (1969)

"Ballad of Forty Dollars" is a song written and recorded by American country music artist Tom T. Hall. It was released in October 1968 as the fourth and final single from the album of the same name, Ballad of Forty Dollars. The song was Hall's first top 10 on the U.S. country singles chart, peaking at number 4 on both the U.S. chart and the Canadian country singles chart.

== Content ==
The song is narrated by a cemetery caretaker who talks about the funeral of a man and the people coming to bid him farewell. The caretaker observes the preacher, the great-uncle’s limousine, the man’s grieving wife, the military "Taps" (as he likely was a war veteran), and the gossip about the man's estate.

== Background ==
Hall took this song, as many of his hits, from personal experience. He was working with his aunt on a cemetery and was observing many funerals and the people coming, then talking about the guy who owed him 40 dollars. He said: "You're certainly not going to go to the widow and collect it. I guess it's lost."

== Chart performance ==
Chart (1968)	Peak position
US Hot Country Songs (Billboard)	4
Canadian RPM Country Tracks	4

== Cover versions ==
The song was covered by Johnny Cash and Waylon Jennings. They released their version, under the title "The Ballad of Forty Dollars", as a single on Columbia (c/w "Field of Diamonds", cat. no. 38-06287) in 1986.
