= I Love What Love Is Doing to Me/He Ain't You =

I Love What Love is Doin' to Me/He Ain't You

Studio album by Lynn Anderson
- Released: 1977
- Recorded: 1977
- Genre: Country pop
- Label: Columbia
- Producer: Glenn Sutton

Lynn Anderson chronology
| Wrap Your Love All Around Your Man (1977) | I Love What Love is Doin' to Me/He Ain't You (1977) | From the Inside (1978) |

I Love What Love Is Doin' to Me/He Ain't You is a studio album by the American musician Lynn Anderson, released 1977. The album featured three single releases for Anderson, the first being the title track which peaked at No. 22 on Billboard's Hot Country Singles. "He Ain't You" reached No. 19. The last single, "We Got Love" was a No. 26 entry in early 1978. The album peaked at No. 38 on Billboard's Country LP chart. The album also features covers of the recent pop hits, "Desperado," "Angel in Your Arms", and "Right Time of the Night".

The album's graphics are notable, featuring a paper doll of Anderson along with accompanying "clothes" on the front and back covers. The record LP also included a paper insert reproducing the doll and clothes so that buyers could have a Lynn Anderson paper doll without cutting the record cover. This unique package makes the record LP release sought after by paper doll collectors as well as country music fans.

The album was Anderson's last with her husband Glenn Sutton at the production helm. They divorced shortly before the record's release.

Both "Desperado" and "My World Begins and Ends with You" were recorded by Kenny Rogers and released on his hit Daytime Friends album, also in 1977.

== Track listing ==
1. "He Ain't You" - 3:06
2. "Desperado" - 3:33
3. "Angel in Your Arms" - 2:59
4. "It's Your Love That Keeps Me Going" - 2:34
5. "My World Begins and Ends with You" - 2:30
6. "I Love What Love Is Doing to Me" - 2:05
7. "We Got Love" - 2:55
8. "Right Time of the Night" - 2:57
9. "Sunshine Man" - 2:08
10. "Will I Ever Hear Those Church Bells Ring" - 3:32
