= Isn't It Always Love =

Song by Karla Bonoff

from the album Karla Bonoff
- B-side: "Rose in the Garden"
- Released: September 1977
- Studio: Sound Factory
- Genre: Pop rock
- Length: 3:06
- Label: Columbia
- Songwriter: Karla Bonoff
- Producer: Kenny Edwards

"Isn't It Always Love" is a song written by Karla Bonoff.

Karen Alexander first recorded the song as the title song for her debut album in 1975. It was also recorded by Bonoff for her debut studio album, Karla Bonoff (1977). The following year it was recorded by Barbi Benton. The song went unreleased as a single until American country music artist Lynn Anderson recorded the track in 1979. The song became a top ten hit for Anderson the same year.

== Versions ==
=== Karla Bonoff version ===
American singer-songwriter Karla Bonoff had recorded the original version of "Isn't It Always Love". The track was recorded at the Sound Factory, located in Los Angeles, California. The song was not issued as a single, but appeared on her debut 1977 album, which was also titled Karla Bonoff. The album was issued as a vinyl record, with "Isn't It Always Love" appearing as the first track on "side one". When reviewing the album, Ruhlmann commented on the song's musical style, saying they "paint an effective picture of the ups and downs of love, circa the mid-'70s." In Canada, the single reached #82 on May 27, 1978.

=== Lynn Anderson version ===
"Isn't It Always Love"

Single by Lynn Anderson

from the album Outlaw Is Just a State of Mind
- B-side: "A Child With You Tonight"
- Released: February 1979
- Studio: Columbia Studio
- Genre: Country; Countrypolitan
- Length: 2:58
- Label: Columbia
- Songwriter: Karla Bonoff
- Producer: David Wolfert

Lynn Anderson singles chronology
"Last Love of My Life" (1978)	"Isn't It Always Love" (1979)	"I Love How You Love Me" (1979)

Anderson recorded her version in 1979 at the Sounds Lab Studio, located in Nashville, Tennessee. The sessions was produced by David Wolfert. Anderson had recently begun working with Wolfert after many years under the production supervision of Glenn Sutton

"Isn't It Always Love" reached number 10 on the Billboard Hot Country Singles chart in 1979. It also reached the top ten on the Canadian RPM Country Songs chart the same year. "Isn't It Always Love" became Anderson's first single to reach the top ten since 1974. The song was issued on Anderson's 1979 studio album, Outlaw Is Just a State of Mind.

==== Track listings ====
7" vinyl single

- "Isn't It Always Love" – 2:58
- "A Child with You Tonight" – 2:45

It was also recorded by Karen Alexander. Her first album was also called: Isn’t it always love”. A version by Lyndia Scott was #42 for two weeks on the Canadian charts in November 1993.

==== Chart performance ====
Chart (1979)	Peak position
Canada Country Songs (RPM)	7
US Hot Country Songs (Billboard)	10
