= Hannah's Gift: Lessons from a Life Fully Lived =

Non-fiction book by Maria Housden

Hannah's Gift - Lessons From a Life Fully Lived
- Author: Maria Housden
- Language: English
- Genre: Inspiration
- Publisher: Bantam Books
- Publication date: February 2002
- Publication place: United States
- Media type: Print (Paperback)
- Pages: 240
- ISBN: 0-00-715567-0
- OCLC: 51668669

Hannah's Gift – Lessons From a Life Fully Lived is a non-fiction book by Maria Housden.

== Overview ==
Hannah's Gift tells the story of Hannah Catherine Martell, a young girl who was diagnosed with a rhabdoid tumor of the kidney, a rare and aggressive form of cancer, at age two and died at age three. The author, Maria Housden, is Hannah's mother, and the book documents her struggle to come to terms with her daughter's sickness and inevitable death while making changes in her own life.

== Reception ==
Hannah's Gift has been translated into 13 languages. While some reviewers focus on the book's message of living life to its fullest and as a resource for bereaved parents, others laud it for showcasing Hannah's ability to understand what was happening to her and accept it.

The book includes biblical references and a Christian perspective, but its lessons about love and faith are universal. One reviewer noted that, as a Muslim, her feelings towards Allah were bolstered.

Hannah's Gift has been recommended as a grief-coping book by the BBC, while Hannah herself was the inspiration for an award at the Riley Hospital for Children. Since writing Hannah's Gift, Housden has become a sought-after speaker on the subject of grief.

== Aspects ==
The themes below are used as chapter titles

- truth
- joy
- faith
- compassion
- wonder

== Publication history ==
- Housden, M, Hannah's Gift: Lessons from a Life Fully Lived, Bantam Books, 2002, ISBN 0-553-80210-0
- Housden, M, Hannah's Gift: Lessons from a Life Fully Lived, DIANE Publishing Co., 2002. ISBN 0-7567-8738-6
- Housden, M. Hannah's Gift: Lessons from a Life Fully Lived HarperCollins Publishers, 2003. ISBN 0-00-715567-0
