= Blue Baby Blue =

Single by Lynn Anderson

from the album Even Cowgirls Get the Blues
- B-side: "The Lonely Hearts Cafe"
- Released: October 1980
- Recorded: April 1980
- Studio: Columbia Studio
- Genre: Country; Countrypolitan
- Length: 2:40
- Label: Columbia
- Songwriter(s): Michael Clark
- Producer(s): Gary Klein; Charles Koppelman

Lynn Anderson singles chronology
| "Even Cowgirls Get the Blues" (1980) | "Blue Baby Blue" (1980) | "Midnight Train to Georgia" (1982) |

"Blue Baby Blue" is a song written by Michael Clark. It was recorded by American country music artist Lynn Anderson and released as a single in 1980 via Columbia Records.

== Background and release ==
"Blue Baby Blue" was recorded in April 1980 at the Columbia Recording Studio, located in Nashville, Tennessee. The session was produced by Gary Klein and Charles Koppelman. It was Anderson's first production assignment with both producers after spending many years at the Columbia label working with her first husband, Glenn Sutton.

"Blue Baby Blue" was released as a single in October 1980. The song spent 13 weeks on the Billboard Hot Country Singles chart before reaching the top 40 at number 27 in December 1980. It was Anderson's final single release for Columbia Records. She would leave the label and not return to the charts until 1983 on the Permian label. The song was issued on Anderson's 1980 album Even Cowgirls Get the Blues.

== Track listings ==
7" vinyl single

- "Blue Baby Blue" – 2:40
- "The Lonely Hearts Cafe" – 3:47

== Chart performance ==
| Chart (1980) | Peak position |
|---|---|
| US Hot Country Songs (Billboard) | 27 |
