= He Ain't You =

Single by Lynn Anderson

from the album I Love What Love Is Doing to Me/He Ain't You
- B-side: "It's Your Love That Keeps Me Going"
- Released: August 1977
- Studio: Columbia Studio
- Genre: Country; Countrypolitan
- Length: 3:06
- Label: Columbia
- Songwriters: Jeff Barry; Brad Burg; Lisa Hartman; Dene Hofheinz
- Producers: Steve Gibson; Glenn Sutton

Lynn Anderson singles chronology
"I Love What Love Is Doing to Me" (1977)	"He Ain't You" (1977)	"We Got Love" (1977)

"He Ain't You" is a song written by Jeff Barry, Brad Burg, Lisa Hartman and Dene Hofheinz. It was first recorded by American actress and singer Lisa Hartman on her 1976 self-titled album. Country music artist Lynn Anderson released it as a single in August 1977 via Columbia Records.

== Background and release ==
"He Ain't You" was recorded at the Columbia Studio in April 1977, located in Nashville, Tennessee. The sessions was produced by Glenn Sutton, Anderson's longtime production collaborator at the label and her first husband. It also was produced by Steve Gibson, who would work with Anderson on future releases.

"He Ain't You" became a major hit when it reached number 19 on the Billboard Hot Country Singles chart in 1977. It also became a major hit on the Canadian RPM Country Songs chart, reaching number 15 the same year. The song was issued on Anderson's 1977 studio album of the I Love What Love Is Doing to Me/He Ain't You.

== Track listings ==
7" vinyl single

- "He Ain't You" – 3:06
- "It's Your Love That Keeps Me Going" – 2:34

== Chart performance ==
Chart (1977)	Peak position
Canada Country Songs (RPM)	15
US Hot Country Songs (Billboard)	19
