= Sea of Heartbreak =

1961 single by Don Gibson

Single by Don Gibson
- B-side: "I Think It's Best (To Forget Me)"
- Released: May 22, 1961
- Recorded: April 5, 1961
- Studio: RCA Studio B, Nashville, Tennessee
- Genre: Country
- Label: RCA Victor
- Songwriters: Paul Hampton; Hal David

Don Gibson singles chronology
"What About Me" (1961)	"Sea of Heartbreak" (1961)	"Lonesome Number One" (1961)

Official audio
- "Sea of Heartbreak" on YouTube

"Sea of Heartbreak" is a song written by Paul Hampton and Hal David and recorded by Don Gibson in 1961. The song reached #2 on the Billboard Hot Country Singles & Tracks chart.

== Content ==
The song describes the feelings of lost love, and compares them to being lost in a metaphorical sea of intensely sad emotion (to an, at least in the chorus and in the overall impression, surprisingly cheery tune). It contains three verses with a chorus at the beginning and ending, and in between verses. As well as a bridge before the third verse. The chorus lines are:-

Sea of heartbreak, lost love an' loneliness;
Memories of your caress, so divine
How I wish you were mine again, my dear.
I am on this sea of tears:
Sea of heartbreak.

== Chart performance ==
Chart (1961)	Peak position
US Hot Country Songs (Billboard)	2
U.S. Billboard Hot 100	21
U.K. Singles Chart	14
Norwegian Singles Chart	10

== Kenny Price version ==
"Sea of Heartbreak"

Single by Kenny Price

from the album Sea of Heartbreak
- B-side: "Smiley"
- Released: 1972
- Genre: Country
- Label: RCA Victor
- Songwriters: Paul Hampton; Hal David

Kenny Price singles chronology
"You Almost Slipped My Mind" (1972)	"Sea of Heartbreak" (1972)	"Don't Tell Me Your Troubles" (1973)

Kenny Price recorded the song in 1972, and peaked at number 24 on the country charts in the USA. It was included on his album of the same name.

=== Chart performance ===
Chart (1972)	Peak position
US Hot Country Songs (Billboard)	24
Canadian RPM Country Tracks	13

== Ronnie McDowell version ==
"Sea of Heartbreak"

Single by Ronnie McDowell

from the album American Music
- B-side: "Ain't Love Wonderful"
- Released: 1989
- Genre: Country
- Label: Curb
- Songwriters: Paul Hampton; Hal David

Ronnie McDowell singles chronology
"Never Too Old to Rock 'n' Roll" (1988)	"Sea of Heartbreak" (1989)	"Who'll Turn Out the Lights" (1989)

"Sea of Heartbreak" was also a single by the American country music artist Ronnie McDowell. Released in 1989, it was the first single from the album American Music. The song reached #39 on the Billboard Hot Country Singles & Tracks chart.

=== Chart performance ===
Chart (1989)	Peak position
US Hot Country Songs (Billboard)	39

== Other cover versions ==
Johnny Cash recorded the song for his Grammy-winning 1996 album Unchained. Cash's daughter, Rosanne Cash, covered the song in 2009 as a duet with Bruce Springsteen on her album The List. British pop group The Searchers recorded a version in 1964 for their album It's the Searchers. The Everly Brothers covered the song on their 1967 album, The Hit Sound of the Everly Brothers. In 1982, Poco went to #35 in the USA on the Adult Contemporary chart with their version. The Hawaiian group Kapena recorded their cover of the song in 1996. In 2004, Jimmy Buffett recorded a version for his License to Chill album. George Strait was featured on this rendition.

The alternative rock band Meat Puppets recorded a version of the song that was featured on the 2019 album Dusty Notes. Lynn Anderson released the song as a single in 1979 from her Outlaw Is Just a State of Mind album and it peaked at number 33 on Billboard's Hot Country Singles chart. Yugoslav rock band Džentlmeni released a Serbo-Croatian version of the song, entitled "Slomljena srca" ("Broken Hearts"), in 1969, the song becoming a large hit in Yugoslavia. Their version appeared in the 1998 Serbian hit film Barking at the Stars. Poco included their version of the song on their 1982 album Cowboys & Englishmen. Czech country singer Michal Tučný released a version of the song, entitled "Snídaně v trávě" ("Breakfast on the Grass"), with lyrics by Zdeněk Rytíř, in 1980.
