= Wrap Your Love All Around Your Man (album) =

Studio album by Lynn Anderson
- Released: 1977
- Recorded: 1976
- Genre: Country
- Label: Columbia
- Producer: Glenn Sutton

Lynn Anderson chronology
Lynn Anderson's Greatest Hits, Volume II (1976)	Wrap Your Love All Around Your Man (1977)	I Love What Love is Doin' to Me (1977)

Professional ratings
Review scores
Source	Rating
The Encyclopedia of Popular Music	3/5 stars

Wrap Your Love All Around Your Man is a studio album by the American musician Lynn Anderson, released in 1977.

This album was successful and sold well. It was named after her hit single from 1977, "Wrap Your Love All Around Your Man". That year, the song was promoted on the highly-popular TV series Starsky & Hutch. Anderson and the song were featured in an episode of the show, bringing great exposure to the title track. The title track reached No. 12 on the Billboard Country charts in 1977. The first single released from the album in late 1976 titled "Sweet Talkin' Man" was a Top 30 Country hit and did fairly well also. "Wrap Your Love All Around Your Man", among other songs on this album, was written by songwriter John Cunningham.

This album featured all new music and was also one of two albums she released in 1977. It reached No. 28 on the "Top Country Albums" chart in 1977. Most of the songs on this album had a Country-Disco feel to them. This meant that Anderson's songs were getting more up-tempo, and had a Disco music-feel, which was not uncommon during this time in Country music.

== Track listing ==
1. "Wrap Your Love All Around Your Man" (John Cunningham) - 2:39
2. "Feelings" (Morris Albert) - 3:29
3. "Let Your Love Flow" (Larry E. Williams) - 2:44
4. "Little Bit More" (Bobby Gosh) - 3:17
5. "Big News in Tennamock Georgia" (John Cunningham) - 3:34
6. "This Country Girl Is Woman Wise" (John Cunningham) - 2:35
7. "You've Got Me to Hold On To" (Dave Loggins) - 3:19
8. "I'll Be Loving You" (Gene Allan, Bobby Vinton) - 2:35
9. "I Couldn't Be Lonely Even If I Wanted To" (Larry Cheshire, Glenn Sutton) - 2:15
10. "Sweet Talkin' Man" (John Cunningham) - 2:59
