= Even Cowgirls Get the Blues (Lynn Anderson album) =

Studio album by Lynn Anderson
- Released: 1980
- Recorded: 1980
- Genre: Country pop
- Label: Columbia
- Producer: Steve Gibson

Lynn Anderson chronology
Outlaw is Just a State of Mind (1979)	Even Cowgirls Get the Blues (1980)	Encore (1981)

Even Cowgirls Get the Blues is the name of a studio album by country music legend Lynn Anderson released in 1980.

This was Anderson's last album with Columbia records, the record company she had been signed to since 1970. Anderson was deciding to go into brief retirement to marry oil tycoon Harold "Spook" Stream (whom she would later divorce) and raise her children. This was going to be her last album until 1983. Two singles were released from the album, the title track and "Blue Baby Blue". Both songs were moderately successful, both peaking within Country's Top 30 in 1980. The title track reached No. 26 and "Blue Baby Blue" reached No. 27. The title track was written by Country singer Rodney Crowell. Crowell would later release his own version of his composition in the early 90s. The album was also modestly successful, reaching No. 37 on the Country albums chart in 1980.

The album's cover was one of Anderson's most sexy poses yet, showing Anderson wearing a cowboy hat and sexy cowgirl attire, including shiny spandex pants.

== Track listing ==
1. "Even Cowgirls Get the Blues" - 2:57
2. "Poor Side of Town" - 3:16
3. "Shoulder to Shoulder" - 3:38
4. "Give You Up to Give You Back" - 2:48
5. "Lonely Hearts Cafe" - 3:47
6. "Blue Baby Blue" - 2:40
7. "You Thrill Me" - 3:08
8. "See Through Me" - 4:08
9. "Love Me Tonight" - 2:49
10. "Louisiana 1927" - 3:16

== Personnel ==
- Acoustic Guitar: Steve Gibson, Billy Sanford, Jerry Shook
- Background Vocals: Lynn Anderson, Sheri Kramer, Lisa Silverman, Diane Tidwell
- Bass guitar: Jack Williams
- Dobro: Sonny Garrish
- Drums: Gunnar Gelotte, Kenny Malone
- Electric guitar: Steve Gibson, Jon Goin, Billy Sanford
- Electric Piano: Buddy Skipper, Bobby Ogdin
- Lead Vocals: Lynn Anderson
- Organ: Bobby Ogdin
- Percussion: Gunner Gelotte, Farrell Morris
- Piano: David Briggs, Bobby Ogdin
- Steel Guitar: Sonny Garrish
- Synthesizer: Shane Keister

Strings by the Sheldon Kurland Strings, arranged and conducted by Buddy Skipper.

== Chart performance ==
Chart (1980)	Peak position
U.S. Billboard Top Country Albums	37
