= Even Cowgirls Get the Blues (novel) =

1976 novel by Tom Robbins

- First edition (hardcover)
- Author: Tom Robbins
- Language: English
- Publisher: Houghton Mifflin
- Publication date: 1976
- Publication place: United States
- Media type: Print (hardback & paperback)
- Pages: 365 pp
- ISBN: 0-395-24305-X
- OCLC: 1993290
- Dewey Decimal: 813/.5/4
- LC Class: PZ4.R636 Ev PS3568.O233

Even Cowgirls Get the Blues is a 1976 novel by Tom Robbins.

== Plot summary ==
Sissy Hankshaw, the novel's protagonist, is a woman born with enormously large thumbs who considers her mutation a gift. The novel covers various topics, including free love, feminism, drug use, birds, political rebellion, animal rights, body odor, religion, and yams.

Sissy capitalizes on the size of her thumbs by becoming a hitchhiker and subsequently travels to New York. The character becomes a model for The Countess, a male homosexual tycoon of menstrual hygiene products. The tycoon introduces Sissy to a staid Mohawk named Julian Gitche, whom she later marries. In her later travels, she encounters, among many others, a sexually open cowgirl named Bonanza Jellybean and an itinerant escapee from a Japanese internment camp happily mislabeled The Chink, who is presented as a hermetic mystic and, at one point writes on a cave wall, "I believe in everything; nothing is sacred. I believe in nothing; everything is sacred." and frequently says "Ha Ha Ho Ho and Hee Hee." A flock of whooping cranes also makes frequent appearances throughout the novel, which includes details of their physical characteristics and migratory patterns. Robbins also inserts himself into the novel (as a character).

== Film adaptation ==
The novel was made into a 1993 film directed by Gus Van Sant and starring Uma Thurman, Lorraine Bracco, Pat Morita, Angie Dickinson, Keanu Reeves, John Hurt, Rain Phoenix, Ed Begley, Jr., Carol Kane, Victoria Williams, Sean Young, Crispin Glover, Roseanne Arnold, Buck Henry, and Grace Zabriskie.

== Literary significance and criticism ==
"Cowgirls ..." has been considered by Gus Van Sant to be a 'hippy' novel. Robbins writes short chapters filled with philosophical asides and quips (such as noting that because amoebae reproduce by binary fission, the first amoeba is still alive), often speaking to the reader (chapter 88 begins with the narrator noting that the book now has as many chapters as a piano has keys).

== In popular culture ==
- John Cale, formerly of The Velvet Underground, named a song and live album after the novel.
- The band Nightmare of You based the song "Thumbelina" on the book.
- The band The Gaslight Anthem titled a song on their album The '59 Sound after the novel.
- Rodney Crowell named a song after the novel, which was recorded by Emmylou Harris on her Blue Kentucky Girl album.
- James Lee Stanley released an album of the same name, intended as a soundtrack to the novel.
- Matthew Milia of the band Frontier Ruckus released a mixtape titled "Even F*ckboys Get the Blues", a play on the novel's title.

== Development history ==
The novel was originally to be published by Doubleday as they had right-of-first-refusal to Robbins's second book. However Robbins terminated his contract with Doubleday for a better offer from editor Ted Solotaroff and Bantam Books. Bantam was mass-paperback publisher, and they auctioned the rights for hardcover to Houghton Mifflin.

=== Partial publication history ===
Even Cowgirls Get the Blues was first published in 1976 by Houghton Mifflin. It was concurrently released as both a hardcover and trade paperback novel. It was later released as a mass-market paperback by Bantam Books.

- First hardcover edition: ISBN 0-395-24305-X, Houghton Mifflin, 1976.
- First trade paperback edition: ISBN 0-395-24510-9, Houghton Mifflin, 1976.
- First mass-market paperback edition Bantam Books, 1977. Reissued in 1990 with ISBN 978-0-553-34949-8
