= We Got Love (Lynn Anderson song) =

Single by Lynn Anderson

from the album I Love What Love Is Doing to Me/He Ain't You
- B-side: "Sunshine Man"
- Released: November 1977
- Recorded: April 1977
- Studio: Columbia Studio
- Genre: Country; Countrypolitan
- Length: 2:05
- Label: Columbia
- Songwriters: Roy Culbertson; Harold Forness; Larry Keith; Steve Pippin
- Producers: Steve Gibson; Glenn Sutton

Lynn Anderson singles chronology
"He Ain't You" (1977)	"We Got Love" (1977)	"Rising Above It All" (1978)

"We Got Love" is a song written by Roy Culbertson, Harold Forness, Larry Keith and Steve Pippin. It was recorded by American country music artist Lynn Anderson and released as a single in 1977 via Columbia Records, becoming a hit the following year.

== Background and release ==
"We Got Love" was recorded in April 1977 at the Columbia Studio, located in Nashville, Tennessee. The sessions was produced by Glenn Sutton, Anderson's longtime production collaborator at the label and her first husband. It was co-produced by Steve Gibson, making the session Anderson's first experience under the co-production of Gibson. Nine additional tracks were recorded at this particular session, including the major hit "He Ain't You."

"We Got Love" was released as a single in November 1977 via Columbia Records. The song spent 13 weeks on the Billboard Hot Country Singles chart before reaching number 26 in January 1978. However, in Canada the song became a major hit when it climbed into the top 20 of the country chart. The single reached number 17 on the Canadian RPM Country Songs chart around the same time frame. The song was issued on Anderson's 1977 studio album I Love What Love Is Doing to Me/He Ain't You, making it the album's third single release.

== Track listings ==
7" vinyl single

- "We Got Love" – 2:55
- "Sunshine Man" – 2:08

== Chart performance ==
Chart (1977–1978)	Peak position
Canada Country Songs (RPM)	17
US Hot Country Songs (Billboard)	26
