= Wrap Your Love All Around Your Man (song) =

Single by Lynn Anderson

from the album Wrap Your Love All Around Your Man
- B-side: "I Couldn't Be Lonely (Even If I Wanted To)"
- Released: 1977
- Recorded: 1976
- Genre: Country pop
- Length: 2:37
- Label: Columbia
- Songwriter: John Cunningham
- Producer: Glenn Sutton

Lynn Anderson singles chronology
"Sweet Talkin' Man" (1976)	"Wrap Your Love All Around Your Man" (1977)	"I Love What Love Is Doing to Me" (1977)

"Wrap Your Love All Around Your Man" is a 1977 hit song by country singer Lynn Anderson.

Best known for her Grammy Award-winning country and pop smash, "Rose Garden", from 1970, Lynn Anderson was one of country music's leading ladies throughout that decade. "Wrap Your Love All Around Your Man" was released and became a major hit on the country charts, peaking at number twelve, her first entry there since 1975.

The song's success was helped by exposure on an episode of the TV series Starsky & Hutch that year, in which Anderson also guest starred as Sue Ann Granger. The song was very up-tempo and had an almost Disco beat. This was becoming fairly common at the time, country music had shifted towards more pop oriented songs; a movement in which Anderson was a key player for much of the decade. An album by the same name as the single was released mid-year of 1977.

== Chart performance ==
Chart (1977)	Peak position
U.S. Billboard Hot Country Singles	12
Canadian RPM Country Tracks	6
