= Jitterbug Perfume =

1984 novel by Tom Robbins

- First edition
- Author: Tom Robbins
- Language: English
- Genre: Fiction Seriocomic
- Publisher: Bantam USA
- Publication date: 1984
- Publication place: United States
- Media type: Print (hardback & paperback)
- Pages: 342 pp
- ISBN: 0-553-05068-0
- OCLC: 11090839
- Dewey Decimal: 813/.54 19
- LC Class: PS3568.O233 J5 1984

Jitterbug Perfume is American writer Tom Robbins' fourth novel and was listed on the New York Times Best Seller list in 1985. The book follows two interweaving storylines, one in Ancient Eurasia and one in the present day. The story connects dueling perfumers in Seattle, Paris, and New Orleans to a bottle of incomparable perfume created by two unlikely but defiant lovers of the past who seek immortality. Orchestrated by a mysterious Irish philosopher, the past and the present collide when the characters come together and discover the unexpected path to life-everlasting. The book was first published in 1984 by Bantam Books and later reprinted by Random House.

== Plot summary ==
A powerful and chiseled 8th-century king named Alobar narrowly escapes regicide at the hands of his own subjects, from a custom of killing the leader at the first sign of aging. After fleeing, no longer a king but only a man, he travels through Eurasia, on a newfound quest for the secret to longevity. Eventually he stumbles upon the stamping grounds of the pungent goat-god Pan, who is slowly losing his godly powers as the world turns toward Christianity. Pan encourages Alobar to continue East in search of the masters of immortality.

Meanwhile, in present day Seattle, Priscilla, a part-time waitress and amateur perfumer, is stalled in re-creating the fragrance from the last remaining drops of a three-hundred-year-old perfume bottle in her possession. She rejects the sexual advances of her co-worker Ricki. She begins an affair with an eccentric Irish philosopher, Wiggs Dannyboy, who runs a clinic for immortality research called the Last Laugh Foundation. She attempts to ignore the mysterious deliveries of beets she keeps receiving at her apartment.

In New Orleans, Priscilla's stepmother, Madame Devalier, a once successful perfumer, is also working to recreate the same fragrance as Priscilla. Madame D's protégé V'lu urges her to attempt to formulate a scent that will compete with their historic competition in Paris. The two have their hands on premium Jamaican jasmine supplied by a mysterious man with the helmet of swarming bees, Bingo Pajama, a symbolic figure in the story.

In Paris, Claude and Marcel LeFever of the LeFever Parfumerie are not concerned with the small perfume house in New Orleans, but rather their new scent and its synthetic base. Claude has been charged with keeping an eye on Marcel's stability. Though the "creative nose" of the company, his latest ideas on evolution of a new consciousness have got his uncle, the owner, Luc Lefever, more than a bit unsettled. It is revealed that Luc has placed Marcel's lover V'lu as a secret agent to send them information about Perfumerie Devalier.

In Ancient India, a heinous widow commits suttee, a ritual of self-immolation. Alobar consoles a young girl, Kudra, who was horrified at the sight of the woman attempting to escape the flames of the funeral pyre. Years later, the girl, now a young woman, arrives at a lamasery where Alobar has taken residence for two decades. The two fall in love, and as with most of Robbins' couples, their mutual libido is enormous, and their love quite like something out of a comedic fairy tale. Kudra reveals that she recently escaped suttee herself, and the two find a common bond in their defiance of death.

Alobar tells Kudra about his encounter with a mysterious group known as "The Bandaloop Doctors," who are masters of immortality. The two set off to the caves of the Bandaloop to learn immortalist practices. Through the remaining vibrations of the now empty caves, the lovers begin a daily practice of controlled breathing, regular fasting, frequent sex, and bathing in extremely hot water. Alobar and Kudra, successful in their practices and never aging, find they are constantly on the run, moving around Europe to avoid the threat of violence against them for their heathen practices. After several hundred years, they have settled and opened a perfume shop in 17th century Paris. When a group of monks threaten their lives, they try to create a perfume to take "stinky Pan" to the New World with them. When time runs out, they attempt a sort of new transcendental meditation and become separated into different astral planes. Alobar completes the perfume formula with Pan using pungent sugar beet pollen as a base and they voyage to the New World. Alobar ultimately loses not only the love of his life, but the precious bottle of sweetly scented perfume.

In the present, the ancient bottle of perfume is stolen by V'lu while Priscilla is attending a dinner with Wiggs Dannyboy at the Last Laugh Foundation. Priscilla goes to New Orleans to retrieve it, but misses Madame Devalier and V'lu. The pair are in hiding after witnessing the murder of Bingo Pajama.

Later, Priscilla's relationship with Wiggs Dannyboy is put on hold by a tragedy at the Last Laugh Foundation. But Dannyboy relays the good news that Marcel Lefever and his good friend, the thousand-year old Alobar, will be coming to New Orleans for Mardi Gras, and that he will arrive shortly thereafter.

Alobar, Marcel, and Priscilla all convene for Mardi Gras, where they encounter Pan one final time. Priscilla recovers the bottle when V'lu and Madame Devalier return. Together, they learn the secret of the mysterious beets, the perfume and the story of Alobar and Kudra. In Paris, the story makes a final stop in another dimension, led by Kudra, discovering the way to immortality.

The main message is summarized in the words spoken in Alobar's 8th century Bohemian dialect Erleichda, loosely translated as "lighten up".

== Cultural connections ==
A restaurant in Arundel, Maine, is named "Bandaloop", with the owners using the book as the primary inspiration for the design of the business; a similar restaurant existed in the Federal Hill neighborhood of Baltimore, US, between 1988 and 2003. Menu items at the Baltimore eating establishment were named after characters and events in the book, while the suspension from the ceiling of a fully decorated, upside-down Christmas tree during the holiday season also garnered attention.

A book store located at 709 West Smith Street in Orlando, Florida from 1991 to 1995 was named Alobar Books, after the main character in the book.

Project Bandaloop, a multi-dimensional dance company founded in 1991 by Amelia Rudolph, was named after the Bandaloop from Jitterbug Perfume.

A hostel in Kathmandu is named Alobar1000 after the book's character, inspired by his extensive travel and pursuit of immortality.

A stage production was produced in Seattle at Cafe Nordo in 2019.

Βανδαλούπ, a historical Greek punk band, has taken its name from The Bandaloop Doctors.

Alobar and Kudra inspired a composition by the Italian pianist and composer Stefano Bollani. Named "Alobar e Kudra", the composition is included in his CD Joy in spite of everything (2014).

Michael Hedges wrote a song inspired by Jitterbug Perfume which he titled "Jitterboogie." It appeared on his Oracle album (1996).

== See also ==
- Pan in popular culture

== Release details ==
- Hardcover – ISBN 0-553-05068-0, published in 1984 by Bantam Books
