= Bantam Books =

Publisher from the USA

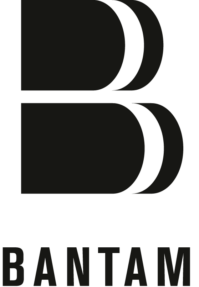
- Parent company: Random House
- Founded: 1945; 81 years ago
- Founder: Walter B. Pitkin Jr.; Sidney B. Kramer; Ian Ballantine; Betty Ballantine
- Country of origin: United States
- Headquarters location: New York City, U.S.
- Imprints: Spectra; Skylark
- Official website: www.randomhousebooks.com/imprint/bantam-books/

Bantam Books is an American publishing house owned entirely by parent company Random House, a subsidiary of Penguin Random House; it is an imprint of the Random House Publishing Group. It was formed in 1945 by Walter B. Pitkin Jr., Sidney B. Kramer, and Ian and Betty Ballantine, with funding from Grosset & Dunlap and Curtis Publishing Company. It has since been purchased several times by companies including National General, Carl Lindner's American Financial and, most recently, Bertelsmann, which in 1986 purchased what had grown to become the Bantam Doubleday Dell publishing group. Bertelsmann purchased Random House in 1998, and in 1999 merged the Bantam and Dell imprints (amongst other mergers within the sprawling publishing house) to become the Bantam Dell publishing imprint. In 2010, the Bantam Dell division was consolidated with Ballantine Books (founded in 1952 by Bantam co-founders Ian and Betty Ballantine) to form the Ballantine Bantam Dell group within Random House. By no later than February 2015, Bantam Books had re-emerged as a stand-alone imprint within Random House; as of 2023, it continues to publish as the Bantam imprint, again grouped in a renamed Ballantine division within Random House.

Bantam began as a mass market publisher, mostly of reprints of hardcover books, with some original paperbacks as well. It expanded into both trade paperback and hardcover books, including original works, often reprinted in house as mass-market editions.

== History ==
The company was failing when Oscar Dystel, who had previously worked at Esquire and as editor on Coronet magazine was hired in 1954 to manage it. By the end of the next year the company was profitable. Dystel retired as chairman in 1980. By that time Bantam was the largest publisher of paperbacks, had over 15% of the market, and exceeded US$100 million in sales.

The company was involved in an important Supreme Court case, Bantam Books, Inc. v. Sullivan in 1963. Bantam Books was prevented from distributing some of its publications in Rhode Island by a state commission called the Rhode Island Commission to Encourage Morality in Youth. The commission, headed by the Rhode Island Attorney General, would essentially blacklist books and magazines it deemed "objectionable" for sale, threatening distributors with publicity and reputational harm. Bantam Books sued, arguing this commission violated freedom of press protections and amounted to illegal censorship without due process. The Supreme Court unanimously ruled in favor of Bantam Books, deciding that the commission's blacklisting practice constituted an unlawful prior restraint on free expression in violation of the First Amendment. The Court held that any system of prior censorship on publications "strikes at the very foundation of freedom of expression" and cannot be enforced unless regulated by precise rules with procedural safeguards. This was an influential decision reinforcing First Amendment protections against government censorship of published materials.

In 1964, Grosset & Dunlap acquired full ownership of Bantam from Curtis. In 1968, Grosset & Dunlap was acquired by conglomerate National General, run by Gene Klein. National General was acquired by American Financial Group in 1973. American Financial sold Bantam to the Italian firm IFI in 1974. Bertelsmann acquired half of Bantam in 1977 and assumed full ownership in 1980. In 1986, Bantam began publishing audiobooks. In 1986, Bertelsmann acquired Doubleday & Company and created the holding Bantam Doubleday Dell. In 1998, Bertelsmann acquired Random House from Advance Publications; Random House became the name of the overall holding company of the various publishing imprints. In 1999, Bertelsmann merged some of the many publishing units it held in Random House, including a merger of Bantam with Dell Publishing, forming the Bantam Dell publishing imprint. Bantam Dell became part of the Random House publishing group in 2008. Ballantine Books was merged with Bantam Dell in 2010. In 2013, Random House merged with Penguin to form Penguin Random House.

In 1998 Bantam won the Locus Award for Best Publisher, reflecting its work in Science Fiction and Fantasy.

== Books published ==
Bantam has published the entire original run of the "Choose Your Own Adventure" series of children's books, as well as the first original novels based upon the Star Trek franchise, publishing about a dozen such books between 1970 and 1982, when the license was taken over by Pocket Books. Bantam also published a dozen volumes of short story adaptations of scripts from Star Trek: The Original Series. Bantam was the former American paperback publisher of The Guinness Book of Records. Another series was "Bantam War Book" from the 1970s to the 1990s, with the majority of books from World War II, but also from Vietnam, Korea and other conflicts.

Other series include Bantam Classics, the Bantam Spectra science fiction imprint, the juvenile Skylark imprint, the Bantam Air & Space imprint, and editions of Shakespeare.

=== Bantam Classics ===
The series was started in 1958. It reprints mostly public domain, unabridged classic books, intended to increase backlist sales and reintroduce the works to new audiences. More than a hundred books have been released in the series.

Like competing editions, some Bantam Classics are printed with an introduction from a literary critic, and in the case of Moby Dick, with a selection of critical essays on the novel appended as well.

== Authors ==
Authors originally published exclusively or significantly by Bantam include:

- Maya Angelou
- Isaac Asimov
- Jean Auel
- Louis L'Amour
- Ray Bradbury
- Ernest Callenbach
- Alan Campbell
- Philip K. Dick
- S. S. Van Dine
- James Dobson
- Stephen R. Donaldson
- Ian Fleming
- Frederick Forsyth
- Lisa Gardner
- Richard Dawkins
- David Gemmell
- Elizabeth George
- William Gibson
- John Glenn
- Daniel Goleman
- Graham Greene
- John Grisham
- Laurell K. Hamilton
- Thomas Harris
- Stephen Hawking
- Mo Hayder
- Hermann Hesse
- Tracy Hickman
- Tami Hoag
- Robin Hobb
- Kay Hooper
- Iris Johansen
- Shmuel Katz
- Dean Koontz
- Emilie Loring
- Lois Lowry
- Robert Ludlum
- Duncan Lunan
- William March
- Shirley MacLaine
- George R. R. Martin
- Malachi Martin
- Anne McCaffrey
- Andy McDermott
- Terence McKenna
- Farley Mowat
- Joseph Murphy
- Michael Palmer
- Robert M. Pirsig
- Daniel Quinn
- Tom Robbins
- Jane Roberts
- Alan Rodgers
- J.D. Salinger
- Alice Schroeder
- H. Norman Schwarzkopf
- Jerry Seinfeld
- Adam Smith
- Lori Nelson Spielman
- John Steinbeck
- Danielle Steel
- Neal Stephenson
- Bruce Sterling
- Rex Stout
- William Tenn
- Margaret Weis
- Elie Wiesel
- Victor Villasenor

== Books originally published by Bantam ==
- A Song of Ice and Fire, George R.R. Martin
- Occult America, Mitch Horowitz
- The Female Man, Joanna Russ
- Spock Must Die!, James Blish
- Ishmael, Daniel Quinn
- The Gap Cycle, Stephen R. Donaldson
- The Saddle Club series
- Time Machine series
- Out on a Limb, Shirley MacLaine
- Blackmark, drawn by Gil Kane and scripted by Archie Goodwin
- Skinny Legs and All, Tom Robbins
- Jitterbug Perfume, Tom Robbins
- Still Life with Woodpecker Tom Robbins
- The Further Adventures of The Joker
- Who Is Guru Maharaj Ji?
- Interstellar Pig, William Sleator
- Talking Straight, Lee Iacocca with Sonny Kleinfeld
- A Brief History of Time, Stephen Hawking
- Flags of Our Fathers, James Bradley with Ron Powers
- The Wolf of Wall Street, Jordan Belfort
- Halloween by Curtis Richards (pseudonym used by author Dennis Etchison)
- Hannah's Gift: Lessons from a Life Fully Lived, Maria Housden

== See also ==
- Rafael Palacios, early book jacket artist at Bantam
