= Tom Robbins =

American writer (1932–2025)

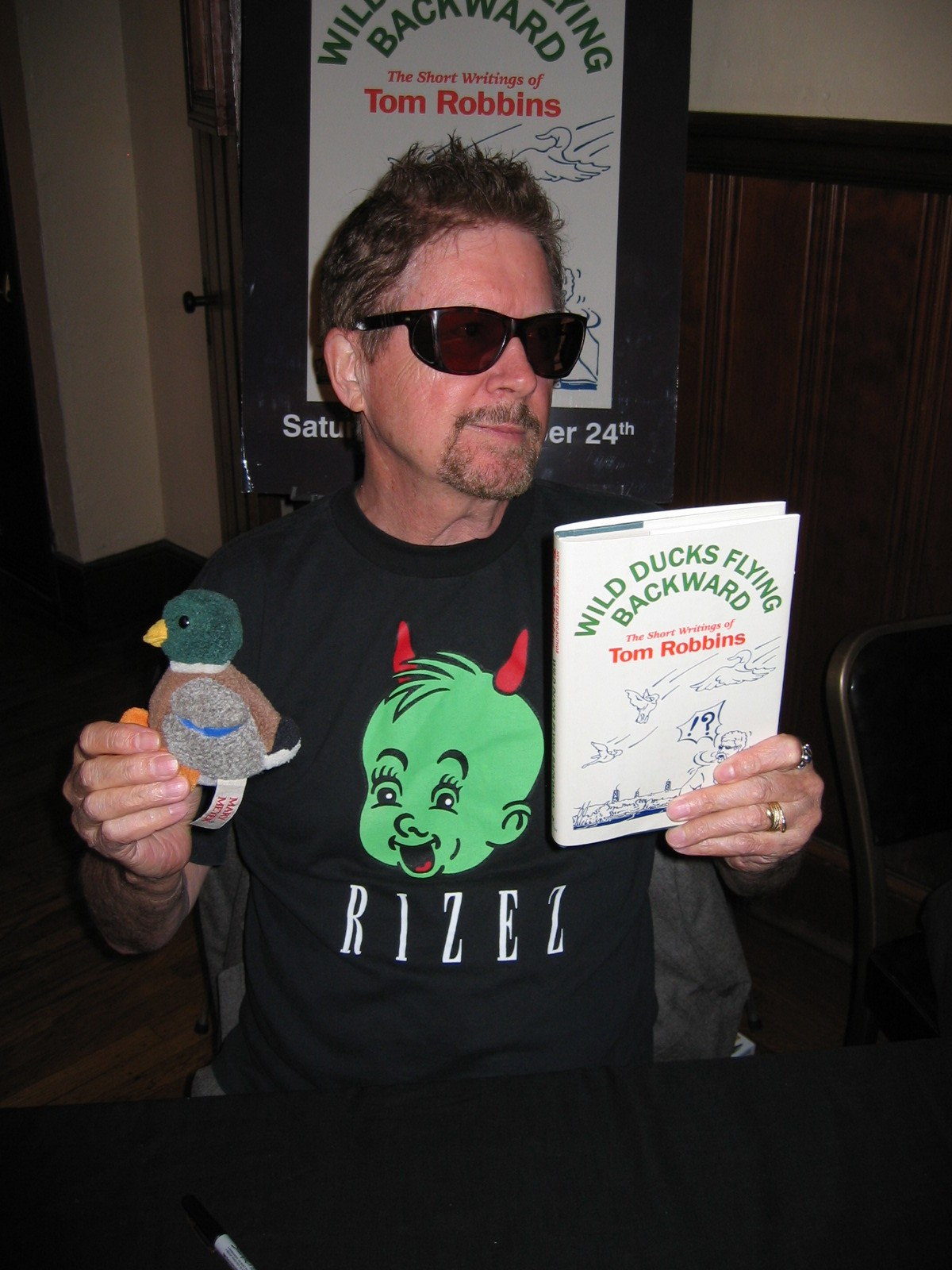
- Robbins at Booksmith in San Francisco, 2005
- Born: Thomas Eugene Robbins; July 22, 1932; Blowing Rock, North Carolina, U.S.
- Died: February 9, 2025 (aged 92); La Conner, Washington, U.S.
- Occupations: Novelist; short story writer; essayist
- Writing career
- Genre: Postmodernism

Thomas Eugene Robbins (July 22, 1932 – February 9, 2025) was an American novelist. His most notable works are "seriocomedies" (also known as "comedy dramas"). His 1976 novel Even Cowgirls Get the Blues was adapted into the 1993 film version by Gus Van Sant. His last work, published in 2014, was Tibetan Peach Pie, a self-declared "un-memoir". From 1970, Robbins lived in La Conner, Washington, where he wrote nine of his books.

== Early life ==
Thomas Eugene Robbins was born on July 22, 1932, in Blowing Rock, North Carolina, to George Thomas Robbins and Katherine Belle Robinson. Both of his grandfathers were Southern Baptist preachers. The Robbins family lived in Blowing Rock before moving to Warsaw, Virginia, when the author was still a young boy. In adulthood, Robbins described his young self as being a "hillbilly".

Robbins attended Warsaw High School (class of 1949) and Hargrave Military Academy in Chatham, Virginia, where he won the Senior Essay Medal. The next year he enrolled at Washington and Lee University in Lexington, Virginia, to major in journalism, leaving at the end of his sophomore year after being disciplined by his fraternity for bad behavior and failing to earn a letter in basketball.

In 1953, he enlisted in the U.S. Air Force after receiving his draft notice, spending a year as a meteorologist in Korea, followed by two years in the Special Weather Intelligence unit of the Strategic Air Command in Nebraska. He was discharged in 1957 and returned to Richmond, Virginia, where his poetry readings at the Rhinoceros Coffee House gained him a reputation in the local bohemian scene.

== Early media work ==
In late 1957, Robbins enrolled at Richmond Professional Institute (RPI), a school of art, drama, and music, which later became Virginia Commonwealth University. He served as an editor and columnist for the college newspaper, Proscript, from 1958 to 1959. He also worked nights on the sports desk of the daily Richmond Times-Dispatch. After graduating with honors from RPI in 1959 and indulging in some hitchhiking, Robbins joined the staff of the Times-Dispatch as a copy editor.

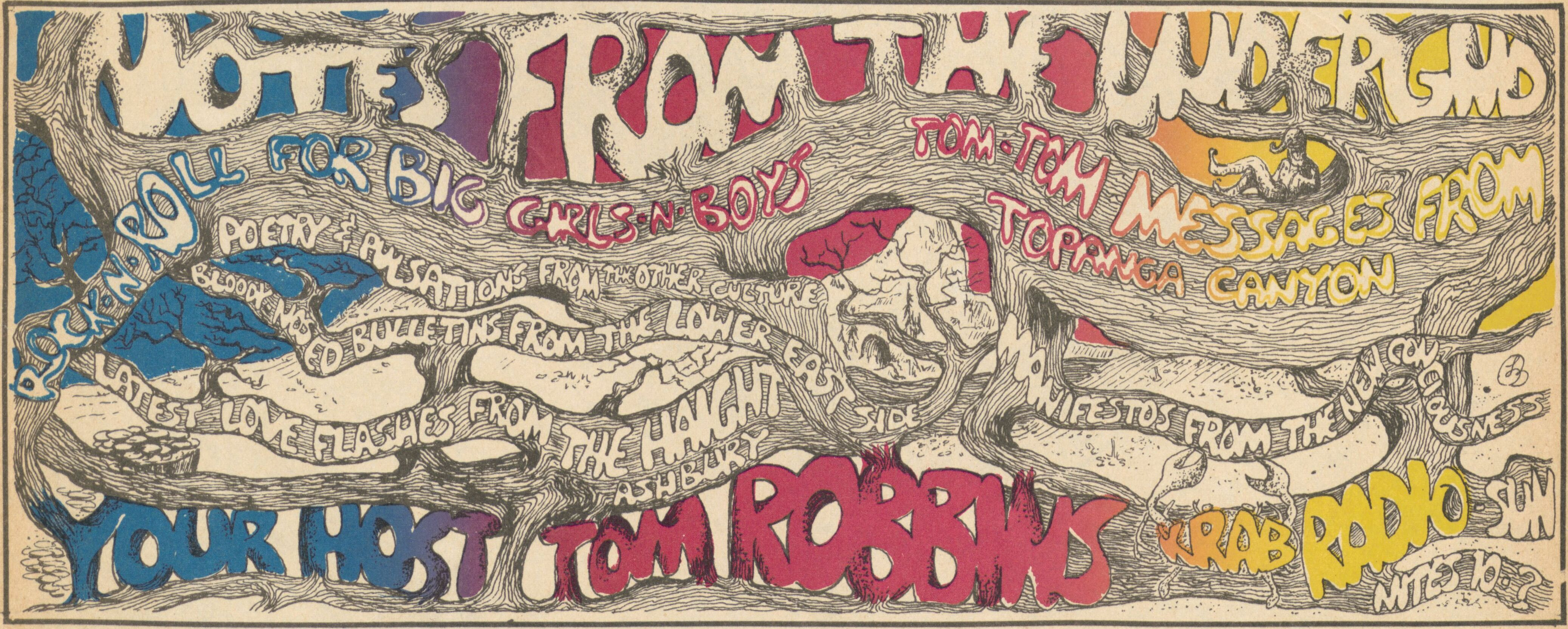
A 1967 ad for Robbins's KRAB radio show, Notes From The Underground, drawn by Walt Crowley

In 1962, Robbins moved to Seattle to seek an M.A. at the Far East Institute of the University of Washington. During the next five years in Seattle (minus a year spent in New York City researching a book on Jackson Pollock) he worked for the Seattle Times as an art critic. In 1965, he wrote a column on the arts for Seattle Magazine as well as occasionally for Art in America and Artforum. Also during this time, he hosted a weekly alternative radio show, Notes from the Underground, at non-commercial KRAB-FM, Seattle. It was in 1967, while writing a review of the rock band The Doors, that Robbins said he found his literary voice. While working on his first novel, Robbins worked the weekend copy desk of the Seattle Post-Intelligencer. Robbins would remain in Seattle, on and off, for the following forty years.

== Writing career ==
In 1966, Robbins was contacted by Doubleday's West Coast editor, Luthor Nichols. Nichols asked Robbins about writing a book on Northwest art. Instead Robbins told Nichols he wanted to write a novel and pitched the idea of what was to become Another Roadside Attraction. In 1967, Robbins moved to South Bend, Washington, where he wrote his first novel. In 1970, Robbins moved to La Conner, Washington, and it was at his home on Second Street that he subsequently authored nine books (although, in the late 1990s, he spent two years living on the Swinomish Indian reservation). In the 1980s and early 1990s, Robbins regularly published articles and essays in Esquire magazine, and also contributed to Playboy, The New York Times, and GQ.

Robbins's 1982 contract with editor Alan Rinzler stipulated that he would accompany Robbins on three holiday trips to resorts Robbins would choose where he could discuss the work-in-progress novel. Rinzler later discovered it was Jitterbug Perfume. He later wrote this on the topic of editing for Robbins:

Tom would read out loud from his work in progress, and I would comment. Just a few pages at a time. He was a real southern gentleman, and welcomed intellectual discourse about his theme, characters, and intentions, from the inside. He took the process of conception, research, trial and error, moving things around, changing voices and pitch very seriously, wrote slowly and carefully, revised constantly, developing, refining and evolving this novel over the course of about two years.

Michael Dare described Robbins's writing style: "When he starts a novel, it works like this. First he writes a sentence. Then he rewrites it again and again, examining each word, making sure of its perfection, finely honing each phrase until it reverberates with the subtle texture of the infinite. Sometimes it takes hours. Sometimes an entire day is devoted to one sentence, which gets marked on and expanded upon in every possible direction until he is satisfied. Then, and only then, does he add a period". When Robbins was asked to explain his "gift" for storytelling in 2002, he replied:

I'm descended from a long line of preachers and policemen. Now, it's common knowledge that cops are congenital liars, and evangelists spend their lives telling fantastic tales in such a way as to convince otherwise rational people that they're factual. So, I guess I come by my narrative inclinations naturally.

Over the course of his writing career, Robbins delivered readings on four continents, in addition to performances he gave at festivals from Seattle to San Miguel de Allende. Robbins also read at Bumbershoot in 2014.

== Recognition ==
In 1997, Robbins won the Bumbershoot Golden Umbrella Award for Lifetime Achievement in the arts that is presented annually by the Bumbershoot arts festival in Seattle. In 2000, Robbins was named one of the 100 Best Writers of the 20th Century by Writer's Digest magazine, while the legendary Italian critic Fernanda Pivano called Robbins "the most dangerous writer in the world".

In October 2012, Robbins received the 2012 Literary Lifetime Achievement Award from the Library of Virginia. In 2015, he was awarded the Willamette Writers' Lifetime Achievement Award and received the award at the Gala Awards Event at the Willamette Writers Conference on August 8, 2015. On September 2, 2023, a "King for a Day" gala and parade was held in Robbins's honor in his hometown of La Conner, Washington. The event also raised money for a children's art program at the local library.

== Other activities ==
During his brief stint in New York in 1965 Robbins joined the New York Filmmakers' Cinematheque. In the mid-1960s, as a member of the Seattle Arts scene, Robbins reviewed art for several publications in Seattle, wrote essays for museum catalogs, organized gallery exhibits, and was the self-described ringleader in a "boisterous neo-Dada gang of guerilla artists, the Shazam Society".

Robbins defended, in print, Indian mystic Osho, although he was never a follower. Robbins spent three weeks at ceremonial sites in Mexico and Central America with mythologist Joseph Campbell, and studied mythology in Greece and Sicily with the poet Robert Bly. Robbins also traveled to Timbuktu. Robbins was a member of the Marijuana Policy Project's advisory board, alongside numerous other notable figures such as Jack Black, Ani DiFranco, Tommy Chong, and Jello Biafra; he was honoured at the Laureate Dinner of Seattle's Rainier Club that has also recognized other local figures, such as Charles Johnson, Stephen Wadsworth, Timothy Egan and August Wilson; and he sat on the board of directors of The Greater Seattle Bureau of Fearless Ideas (formerly 826 Seattle), "a nonprofit writing and tutoring center dedicated to helping youth, ages six to 18, improve their creative and expository writing skills, and to helping teachers inspire their students to write."

Madame Zoe, a Richmond, Virginia, USA, psychic and palm reader who once lived in Richmond's South Side, was fictionalized in Robbins's Even Cowgirls Get the Blues. In 2016 Richmond artists Noah Scalin and Thea Duskin recreated her bedroom as an installation in the art gallery at Chop Suey Books in Carytown in Richmond. The novel Even Cowgirls Get the Blues was adapted into a film in 1993 by Gus Van Sant, starring Uma Thurman, Lorraine Bracco, and Keanu Reeves.

== Personal life and death ==
Robbins was a friend of Terence McKenna, whose influence appears evident in a couple of his books. A main character (Larry Diamond) in Half Asleep in Frog Pajamas advocates a theory similar to those of McKenna, involving the history and cultural influences of psychedelic plants. Robbins also spent time with Timothy Leary and the author said that one of the protagonists in Jitterbug Perfume (Wiggs Dannyboy) exhibited certain characteristics of Leary's personality; Robbins acknowledged using LSD with Leary.

He was friends with Gus Van Sant, and performed the voice-over narration in Van Sant's film adaptation of Even Cowgirls Get the Blues. He was friends with directors Robert Altman and Alan Rudolph, as well, and had small speaking parts in five feature films.

Robbins lived in La Conner, Washington, and died there on February 9, 2025, at the age of 92.

== Works ==
Robbins was the author of eight published novels. He wrote numerous short stories and essays, mostly collected in the volume Wild Ducks Flying Backward, and one novella, B Is for Beer.

=== Novels ===
- Another Roadside Attraction (1971; ISBN 0-553-34948-1)
- Even Cowgirls Get the Blues (1976; ISBN 0-395-24305-X)
- Still Life with Woodpecker (1980; ISBN 0-553-27093-1)
- Jitterbug Perfume (1984; ISBN 0-553-05068-0)
- Skinny Legs and All (1990; ISBN 0-553-05775-8)
- Half Asleep in Frog Pajamas (1994; ISBN 0-553-07625-6)
- Fierce Invalids Home from Hot Climates (2000; ISBN 0-553-10775-5)
- Villa Incognito (2003; ISBN 0-553-80332-8)

=== Collections ===
- Wild Ducks Flying Backward (a collection of essays, reviews, and short stories, 2005; ISBN 0-553-80451-0)

=== Novellas ===
- B Is for Beer (2009; ISBN 0-06-168727-8)

=== Nonfiction ===
- Guy Anderson (monograph—16 pages of biographical notes within a collection of Anderson's work; 1965)
- Tibetan Peach Pie: A True Account of an Imaginative Life (autobiography, 2014; ISBN 9780062267405)
