= The Very Best of Jerry Garcia =

Compilation album by Jerry Garcia
- Released: September 26, 2006
- Recorded: 1971 – 1990
- Genre: Rock, folk
- Label: Rhino

Jerry Garcia chronology
Pure Jerry: Coliseum, Hampton, VA, November 9, 1991 (2006)	The Very Best of Jerry Garcia (2006)	Live at the Boarding House (2008)

Professional ratings
Review scores
Source	Rating
AllMusic	3.5/5 stars
The Music Box	4/5 stars

The Very Best of Jerry Garcia is a two-CD compilation album. It contains songs, mostly previously released, by Jerry Garcia, the Jerry Garcia Band, the Jerry Garcia Acoustic Band, Old & In the Way, and Reconstruction. It is meant to showcase Garcia's work outside the Grateful Dead. The first disc contains studio recordings and the second disc contains live recordings. It was released on September 26, 2006.

Some copies of the album include two bonus discs called More of the Best and Twisted Radio Waves.

The Very Best of Jerry Garcia was released for Record Store Day as a five-disc LP, in a limited edition of 4,000 copies, on September 26, 2020.

== Track listing ==
Disc one (studio)

From Garcia (1972):

1. "Deal" (Jerry Garcia, Robert Hunter) – 3:14
2. "Bird Song" (Garcia, Hunter) – 4:26
3. "Sugaree" (Garcia, Hunter) – 5:54
4. "Loser" (Garcia, Hunter) – 4:10
5. "The Wheel" (Garcia, Hunter) – 4:12

From Garcia (1974):

6. "Let It Rock" (Chuck Berry) – 3:12
7. "Russian Lullaby" (Irving Berlin) – 3:04

From Reflections:

8. "Might as Well" (Garcia, Hunter) – 3:54
9. "Mission in the Rain" (Garcia, Hunter) – 5:04
10. "I'll Take a Melody" (Allen Toussaint) – 9:28

From Cats Under the Stars:

11. "Rubin and Cherise" (Garcia, Hunter) – 5:17
12. "Cats Under the Stars" (Garcia, Hunter) – 5:31
13. "Rhapsody in Red" (Garcia, Hunter, John Kahn) – 5:11

From Run for the Roses:

14. "Run for the Roses" (Garcia, Hunter) – 3:41
15. "Knockin' on Heaven's Door" (Bob Dylan) – 7:40
16. "Without Love" (Clyde McPhatter) – 4:26

Disc two (live)

From Breakdown:

1. "Catfish John" (Bob McDill, Allen Reynolds) – 4:06

From Almost Acoustic:

2. "Deep Elem Blues" (traditional) – 6:09
3. "Ripple" (Garcia, Hunter) – 4:21

From Garcia Plays Dylan:

4. "Positively 4th Street" (Dylan) – 10:46

From Pure Jerry: Theatre 1839, July 29 & 30, 1977:

5. "The Harder They Come" (Jimmy Cliff) – 12:43

From How Sweet It Is:

6. "Gomorrah" (Garcia, Hunter) – 6:37

Previously unreleased performance by Reconstruction on July 8, 1979:

7. "Dear Prudence" (John Lennon, Paul McCartney) - 11:38

From Jerry Garcia Band:

8. "Señor (Tales of Yankee Power)" (Dylan) - 7:45
9. "Evangeline" (David Hidalgo, Louie Perez) – 4:47

From Way After Midnight, the bonus disc for After Midnight: Kean College, 2/28/80:

10. "Deal" (Garcia, Hunter) - 9:12

== Personnel ==
See individual albums for musical personnel.

=== Production ===
- Compilation producers – James Austin, Joe Gastwirt, Blair Jackson, Peter McQuaid
- Product manager – Jimmy Edwards
- Tape research, liner notes – Blair Jackson
- Remastering – Joe Gastwirt
- Discographical annotation – Reggie Collins
- Editorial supervision – Dorothy Stefanski
- Art direction, design – Jean Krikorian
- Photography – Herb Greene, Jon Sievert, Richard E. Aaron, Dave Patrick
- Painting – Jerry Garcia
- Project assistance – Karen LeBlanc, James O'Toole
