= All Good Things: Jerry Garcia Studio Sessions =

Box set by Jerry Garcia
- Released: April 20, 2004
- Recorded: 1971 – 1981
- Genres: Folk rock, roots rock
- Label: Rhino
- Producers: James Austin, David Gans, Blair Jackson

Jerry Garcia chronology
Been All Around This World (2004)	All Good Things: Jerry Garcia Studio Sessions (2004)	Pure Jerry: Theatre 1839, San Francisco, July 29 & 30, 1977 (2004)

All Good Things: Jerry Garcia Studio Sessions is a six-CD box set by Jerry Garcia. It contains Garcia's five solo studio albums, and an additional disc with previously unreleased studio recordings. The albums are remastered for the box set, and include bonus tracks such as alternate versions and outtakes from the album recording sessions. The box set also includes a 128-page book. It was released by Rhino Records on April 20, 2004. A bonus disc, All Good Things Redux, was also included with pre-orders from jerrygarcia.com.

The albums included in All Good Things are Garcia (1972), Garcia (1974), Reflections (1976), Cats Under the Stars (1978), and Run for the Roses (1982).

== Critical reception ==
Professional ratings
Review scores
Source	Rating
Allmusic	4/5 stars
Rolling Stone	3.5/5 stars
Music Box	4/5 stars

On Allmusic, Stephen Thomas Erlewine said, "... All Good Things is for the diehards, the ones who enjoy hearing every scrap of tape that Garcia played, fully aware of the erratic nature of his solo career and willing to purchase an expensive box set with that in mind. They will certainly be pleased with this lovingly produced set, which boasts excellent HDCD remastering, individual digipaks, and a detailed 128-page book that contains an introduction by Robert Hunter, an overview of Garcia's solo career, and individual notes for each album. While it's unlikely that anybody outside of those dedicated fans will find this of interest — Jerry's albums, when taken together, confirm both your best and worst feelings about his music — the Dead have always been a band that treated their devoted very well, and this is a box targeted at those very fans. If you know what you're getting into, you will not be disappointed by the quality of All Good Things."

In Rolling Stone, Vic Garbarini wrote, "The six-CD All Good Things contains five studio albums, plus hours of superior outtakes... As his friend and lyricist Robert Hunter candidly admits in the superb liner notes, these solo collections are decidedly 'a mixed lot'. Anyone expecting spacey improvs is in for a surprise. Garcia is attempting here to put aside what he termed the Dead's 'call of the Weird' and work on his songwriting, arranging and other skills while having just a whole lot of fun. Essentially, there's the first album, 1972's Garcia, and then there's everything else."

On Jambands.com, John Patrick Gatta said, "This reintroduction to Jerry Garcia's solo work — four albums under his name and one as Jerry Garcia Band — offers a treasure for those who purchased the goods on vinyl or the original CD pressings. These revamped recordings shine like the first sunny day after a long hard winter. I tested my copy of Run for the Roses with the new version and there's a world of difference. The volume on the remixed and remastered HDCD disc brings the instruments up in order to add stronger support. At times, the clarity is amazing. In particular, I recall some of the bonus material on Garcia. You can hear Bill Kreutzmann's tapping of drumstick to cymbal or drumhead as if you're sitting next to him in the studio."

== Track listing ==
Disc one

Garcia (1972)

1. "Deal" (Jerry Garcia, Robert Hunter)
2. "Bird Song" (Garcia, Hunter)
3. "Sugaree" (Garcia, Hunter)
4. "Loser" (Garcia, Hunter)
5. "Late for Supper" (Garcia)
6. "Spidergawd" (Garcia, Bill Kreutzmann, Hunter)
7. "Eep Hour" (Garcia, Kreutzmann)
8. "To Lay Me Down" (Garcia, Hunter)
9. "An Odd Little Place" (Garcia, Kreutzmann)
10. "The Wheel" (Garcia, Kreutzmann, Hunter)

Bonus tracks:

11. "Sugaree" (alternate take) (Garcia, Hunter)
12. "Loser" (alternate take) (Garcia, Hunter)
13. "Late for Supper" / "Spidergawd" / "Eep Hour" (alternate takes) (Garcia, Kreutzmann, Hunter)
14. "The Wheel" (alternate take no. 1) (Garcia, Kreutzmann, Hunter)
15. "The Wheel" (alternate take no. 2) (Garcia, Kreutzmann, Hunter)
16. Study for "Eep Hour" (Garcia, Kreutzmann)
17. "Dealin' from the Bottom" (studio jam) (Garcia, Kreutzmann)
18. Study for "The Wheel" (Garcia, Kreutzmann)

Disc two

Garcia (1974)

1. "Let It Rock" (Chuck Berry)
2. "When the Hunter Gets Captured by the Game" (Smokey Robinson)
3. "That's What Love Will Make You Do" (Henderson Thigpen, James Banks, Eddy Marion)
4. "Russian Lullaby" (Irving Berlin)
5. "Turn On the Bright Lights" (Albert Washington)
6. "He Ain't Give You None" (Van Morrison)
7. "What Goes Around" (Mac Rebbenack)
8. "Let's Spend the Night Together" (Mick Jagger, Keith Richards)
9. "Mississippi Moon" (Peter Rowan)
10. "Midnight Town" (John Kahn, Hunter)

Bonus tracks:

11. "That's a Touch I Like" (Jesse Winchester)
12. "(I'm a) Road Runner" (Brian Holland, Lamont Dozier, Eddie Holland)
13. "It's Too Late (She's Gone)" (Chuck Willis)
14. "I'll Forget You" (Copyright Control)
15. "Tragedy" (Fred Burch, Gerald Nelson)
16. "Think" (Jimmy McCracklin, Deadric Malone)
17. "I Know It's a Sin" (Jimmy Reed)
18. "Lonesome Town" (Thomas Baker Knight)
19. "Cardiac Arrest" (studio jam) (Garcia, Kahn, Michael Omartian, Merl Saunders, Ron Tutt)
20. "Back Home in Indiana" (James F. Hanley, Ballard McDonald)

Disc three

Reflections

1. "Might As Well" (Garcia, Hunter)
2. "Mission In The Rain" (Garcia, Hunter)
3. "They Love Each Other" (Garcia, Hunter)
4. "I'll Take a Melody" (Allen Toussaint)
5. "It Must Have Been the Roses" (Hunter)
6. "Tore Up Over You" (Hank Ballard)
7. "Catfish John" (Bob McDill, Allen Reynolds)
8. "Comes a Time" (Garcia, Hunter)

Bonus tracks:

9. "Mystery Train" (studio jam) (Junior Parker, Sam Phillips)
10. "All By Myself" (studio jam) (Fats Domino, Dave Bartholomew)
11. "Oh Babe, It Ain't No Lie" (Elizabeth Cotten)
12. "You Win Again" (Hank Williams)
13. "Orpheus" (Grateful Dead)

Disc four

Cats Under the Stars

1. "Rubin and Cherise" (Garcia, Hunter)
2. "Love in the Afternoon" (Kahn, Hunter)
3. "Palm Sunday" (Garcia, Hunter)
4. "Cats Under the Stars" (Garcia, Hunter)
5. "Rhapsody in Red" (Garcia, Kahn, Hunter)
6. "Rain" (Donna Jean Godchaux)
7. "Down Home" (Kahn)
8. "Gomorrah" (Garcia, Hunter)

Bonus tracks:

9. "Magnificent Sanctuary Band" (Dorsey Burnette)
10. "I'll Be with Thee" (traditional)
11. "The Way You Do the Things You Do" (Robinson, Bobby Rogers)
12. "Mighty High" (David Crawford, Richard Downing)
13. "Don't Let Go" (Jesse Stone)
14. "Down Home" (rehearsal version) (Kahn)
15. "Palm Sunday" (alternate take) (Garcia, Hunter)

Disc five

Run for the Roses

1. "Run for the Roses" (Garcia, Hunter)
2. "I Saw Her Standing There" (John Lennon, Paul McCartney)
3. "Without Love" (Clyde McPhatter)
4. "Midnight Getaway" (Garcia, Kahn, Hunter)
5. "Leave the Little Girl Alone" (Kahn, Hunter)
6. "Valerie" (Garcia, Hunter)
7. "Knockin' on Heaven's Door" (Bob Dylan)

Bonus tracks:

8. "Peggy-O" (traditional)
9. "Alabama Getaway" (Garcia, Hunter)
10. "Tangled Up in Blue" (Dylan)
11. "Simple Twist of Fate" (Dylan)
12. "Dear Prudence" (Lennon, McCartney)
13. "Valerie" (alternate mix) (Garcia, Hunter)

Disc six

Outtakes, Jams, and Alternates

1. "Deal" (alternate take) (Garcia, Hunter)
2. "Let's Spend the Night Together" (alternate take) (Jagger, Richards)
3. "Mississippi Moon" (alternate take) (Rowan)
4. "Lonesome Town" (acoustic version) (Knight)
5. "Catfish John" (alternate take) (McDill, Reynolds)
6. "I'll Take a Melody" (alternate take) (Toussaint)
7. "My Sisters and Brothers" (Charles Johnson)
8. "Hully Gully" / "Rockin' Pneumonia and the Boogie Woogie Flu" (studio jam) (Fred Sledge Smith, Clifford Goldsmith / Huey "Piano" Smith, John Vincent)
9. "Streamlined Cannonball" (studio jam) (Roy Acuff)
10. "Iko Iko" (studio jam) (James "Sugar Boy" Crawford)
11. "Hey Bo Diddley" / "Hide Away" (studio jam) (Bo Diddley / Freddie King, Sonny Thompson)
12. "Accidentally Like a Martyr" (Warren Zevon)

Bonus disc

All Good Things Redux

1. "I Saw Her Standing There" (Lennon, McCartney)
2. "Russian Lullaby" (Berlin)
3. "T.L.E.O. Jam" (Garcia, Hunter)
4. "Visions of Johanna" (Dylan)

== Personnel ==
Box set

- Produced for release by James Austin, David Gans, Blair Jackson
- Executive producers: Christopher Sabec, Peter McQuaid, Hale Milgrim
- Archivist: Joel Bernstein
- Mastering: Joe Gastwirt
- Additional mixing: Tom Flye
- Art direction: Hugh Brown, Steve Vance
- Design: Steve Vance
- Liner notes: Robert Hunter, Blair Jackson, Gary Lambert, Steve Silberman, Dennis McNally

Albums

- Garcia (1972) produced by Bob Matthews and Betty Cantor-Jackson, with Laurence Shurtliff and Bill Kreutzmann
- Garcia (1974) produced by John Kahn
- Reflections produced by Jerry Garcia
- Cats Under the Stars produced by Jerry Garcia
- Run for the Roses produced by Jerry Garcia and John Kahn
