= Ron Tutt =

American drummer (1938–2021)

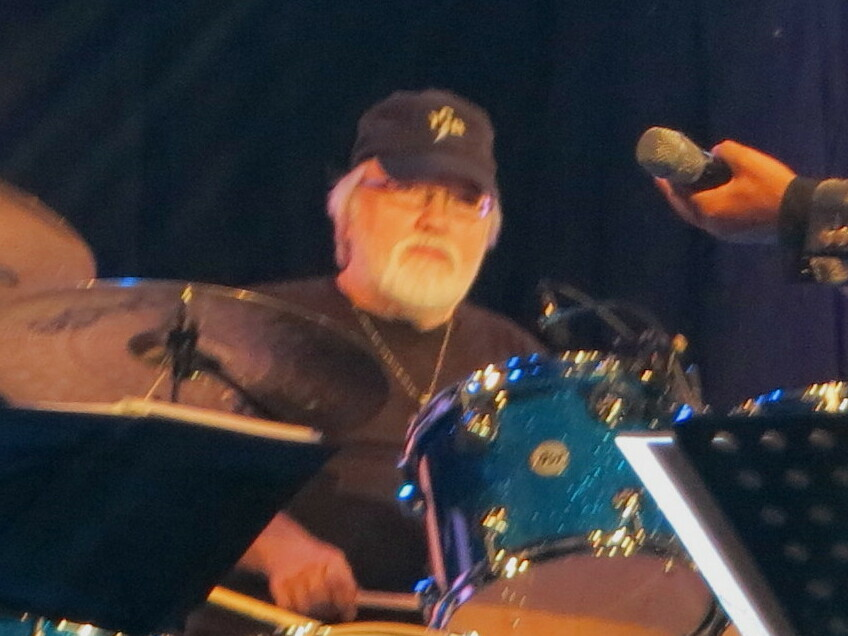
- Tutt performing in 2013

Background information
- Born: Ronald Ellis Tutt; March 12, 1938; Dallas, Texas, US
- Died: October 16, 2021 (aged 83) Franklin, Tennessee, United States
- Genres: Rock, country
- Occupation: Musician
- Instruments: Drums
- Formerly of: TCB Band

Ronald Ellis Tutt (March 12, 1938 – October 16, 2021) was an American drummer who was the principal drummer for Elvis Presley, Neil Diamond, the Carpenters, Roy Orbison, and Jerry Garcia. He was also a session drummer who recorded with some of the most prominent musicians of his day.

== Early life ==
Tutt was born in Dallas, the only child of Frank Mac Tutt, and Gipsy Fay Clark Tutt. He was involved with music and the performing arts for most of his childhood; he also played the guitar, violin and trumpet.

At age 16, Tutt played his first paying gig, with a Western Swing band which included guitarists Tommy Morrell and Leon Rhodes; they would become the staff band for The Northside Jamboree with Scotty Moore and Bill Black, Saturday night live radio broadcasts which aired from the Northside Coliseum in Fort Worth. Moore and Black would soon become members of Elvis Presley's first back-up band.

In 1956, after graduating from North Dallas High School, Tutt attended the University of North Texas at Denton where he studied music. In 1959, he left school to pursue his career.

== TCB Band ==
Tutt played for the TCB Band ("Taking Care of Business"), the Elvis Presley touring and recording band, which he auditioned for in 1969. He flew in with his drum kit, which he set up in the recording studio, though while he was waiting to be called, another drummer walked in and began playing his kit. Tutt thought that he had lost the chance to even audition, as Gene Pello was incredibly experienced and seemed to be winning Elvis Presley over. However, Presley's manager, Colonel Tom Parker, did not want to waste any money having paid to fly Tutt and his drums over, and so Elvis was persuaded to give Tutt a turn. Elvis hired him that day saying, "You know Ronnie, those other drummers were good but they were doing their own thing. You were watching me all the time".

Tutt chose not to be sycophantic around Elvis, and remained forthright in his dealings with the star. Elvis respected him for this and they developed a good friendship, with Elvis once buying him an engraved solid gold Swiss watch.

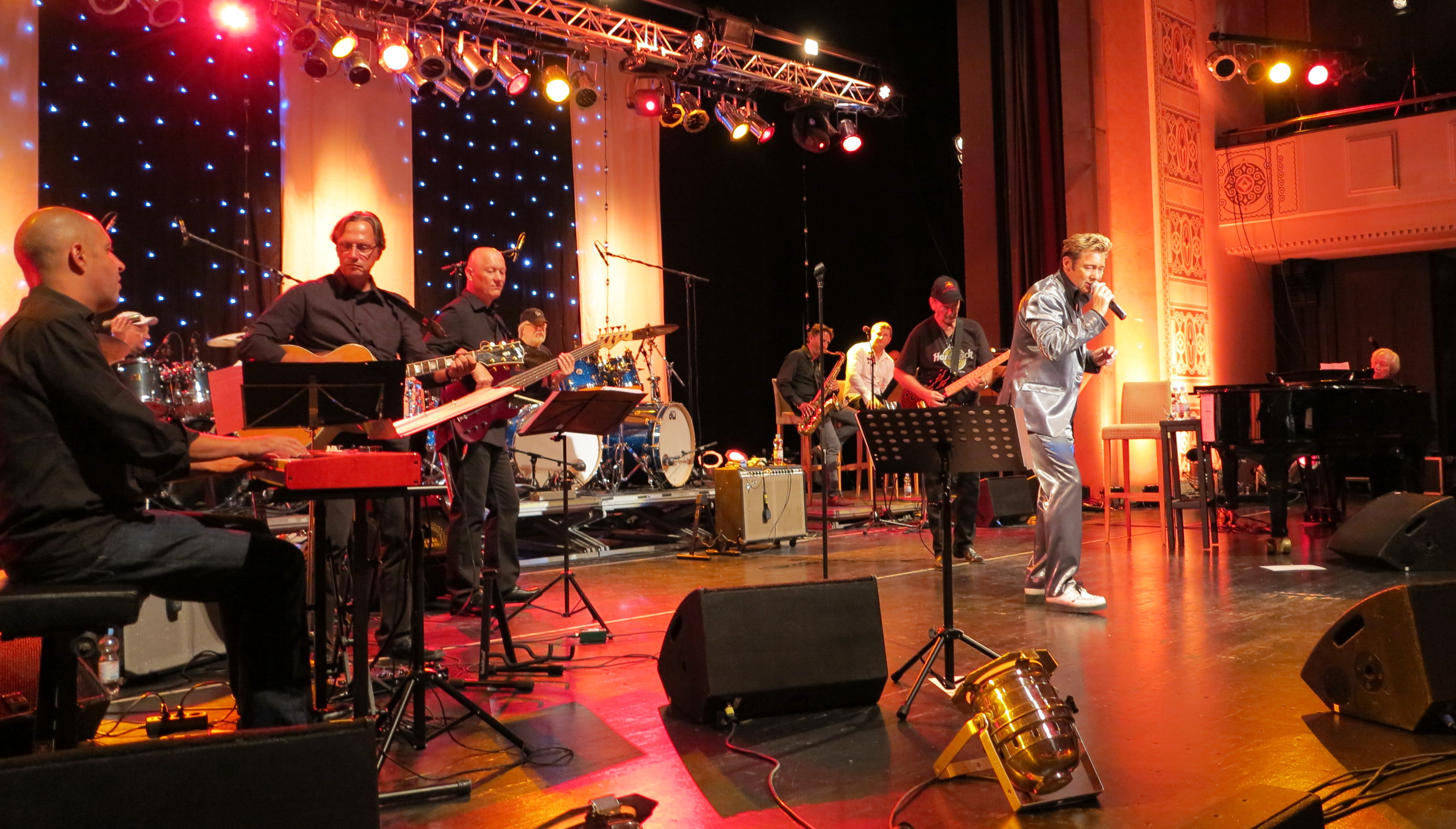
The TCB Band

== Session musician ==
Tutt played on Billy Joel's second and third albums: 1973's breakthrough, Piano Man (all tracks but "Captain Jack") and 1974's Streetlife Serenade.

In February 1974, Tutt began recording sessions with Jerry Garcia for his album Garcia and, in the Fall, for Reflections. In December he began touring with Jerry Garcia's and Merl Saunders' Legion of Mary and continued with the Jerry Garcia Band from Fall 1975 through mid-1977. He also contributed to the studio sessions for Cats Under the Stars (1978) and Run For The Roses (1981) and toured with the Garcia Band through the end of that year.

== Personal life and death ==
Tutt married Loretta Ann McCraney in 1961; they had 5 children before divorcing in 1971. He was married to Donna Tutt from 1973 until his death; they had 4 children, one of whom Nathan Ellis Tutt pre-deceased his father.

Tutt died of heart disease at his home in Franklin, Tennessee at age 83.

== Discography ==
- Elvis Presley – From Memphis to Vegas / From Vegas to Memphis, 1969
- Elvis Presley – On Stage, 1970
- Dory Previn – On My Way to Where, 1970
- Hedge & Donna – Special Circumstances, 1970
- Johnny Rivers – Slim Slo Slider, 1970
- Eve – Take It & Smile, 1970
- Elvis Presley – That's the Way It Is, 1970
- Delaney & Bonnie – To Bonnie from Delaney, 1970
- Richard Twice – Richard Twice, 1970
- Mother Hen – Mother Hen, 1971
- Hedge & Donna – Evolution, 1971
- John Hurley – Delivers One More Hallelujah, 1971
- Quincy Jones – Dollars (soundtrack), 1971
- Helen Reddy – Helen Reddy, 1971
- Lalo Schifrin – Rock Requiem, 1971
- George Gerdes – Obituary, 1971
- Michael Nesmith – Nevada Fighter, 1971
- Dory Previn – Mythical Kings and Iguanas 1971
- Mason Williams – Improved, 1971
- Johnny Rivers – Home Grown, 1971
- Henry Mancini – Sometimes a Great Notion (soundtrack), 1971
- John Stewart – Sunstorm, 1971
- Barbra Streisand – Stoney End, 1971
- Gladstone – Gladstone, 1972
- B.J. Thomas – Billy Joe Thomas, 1972
- Barbara Keith – Barbara Keith, 1972
- Balderdash – Ballad of Goodness & Mercy, 1972
- Elvis Presley – As Recorded at Madison Square Garden, 1972
- John Hurley – Children's Dreams, 1973
- Buckingham Nicks – Buckingham Nicks, 1973
- Jim Horn – Through the Eyes of a Horn, 1972
- Dory Previn – Mary C. Brown and the Hollywood Sign, 1972
- Gladstone – Lookin' for a Smile, 1973
- Gram Parsons – GP, 1973
- Billy Joel – Piano Man, 1973
- Elvis Presley – The Fool Album, 1973
- Elvis Presley – Aloha from Hawaii via Satellite, 1973
- José Feliciano – And the Feeling's Good, 1974
- Sherman Hayes – Vagabond's Roost, 1973
- Elvis Presley – Raised on Rock / For Ol' Times Sake, 1973
- The Hues Corporation – Freedom for the Stallion, 1973
- Larry Carlton – Singing/Playing, 1973
- The Hagers – The Hagers, 1974
- Billy Joel – Streetlife Serenade, 1974
- Hugo Montenegro – Hugo in Wonder-Land, 1974
- Gram Parsons – Grievous Angel, 1974
- Jerry Garcia – Garcia, 1974
- Dory Previn – Dory Previn, 1974
- Sarah Kernochan – Beat Around the Bush, 1974
- Harriet Schock – Hollywood Town, 1974
- Alex Harvey – True Love, 1974
- Emmylou Harris – Pieces of the Sky, 1975
- Jackie DeShannon – New Arrangement, 1975
- Kenny Rankin – Silver Morning, 1975
- Emmylou Harris – Elite Hotel, 1975
- Larry Hosford – A.K.A. Lorenzo, 1975
- Lobo – A Cowboy Afraid of Horses, 1975
- Elvis Presley – Today, 1975
- David Cassidy – The Higher They Climb, The Harder They Fall, 1975
- John Stewart – Wingless Angels, 1975
- Jerry Garcia Band – Garcia Live Volume 17, 1976
- Allan Rich – Glass Heart, 1976
- Deardorff & Joseph – Deardorff & Joseph, 1976
- Andy Williams – Andy, 1976
- David Cassidy – Home Is Where the Heart Is, 1976
- Gram Parsons/The Flying Burrito Brothers – Sleepless Nights, 1976
- Silverado – Silverado, 1976
- Jerry Garcia – Reflections, 1976
- England Dan & John Ford Coley – I Hear Music, 1976
- The Carpenters – Passage, 1977
- Nancy Shanks – Nancy Shanx, 1977
- Mary K. Miller – Handcuffed to a Heartache, 1978
- Gale Force – Two, 1978
- Angelo – Midnight Prowl (1978)
- Wendy Waldman – Strange Company, 1978
- Helen Reddy – Live in London, 1978
- Keola & Kapono Beamer – Honolulu City Lights, 1978
- Captain & Tennille – Dream, 1978
- The Carpenters – Christmas Portrait, 1978
- Jerry Garcia Band – Cats Under the Stars, 1978
- Evie Sands – Suspended Animation, 1979
- Maria Muldaur – Open Your Eyes, 1979
- Emmylou Harris – Blue Kentucky Girl, 1979
- Mink DeVille – Le Chat Bleu, 1980
- Tony Sciuto – Island Nights, 1980
- Doc & Merle Watson – Red Rocking Chair, 1981
- The Carpenters – Made in America, 1981
- Jim Keltner & Ron Tutt – The Sheffield Drum Record, 1982 recorded December 1980
- Jerry Garcia – Run for the Roses, 1982
- Neil Diamond – Heartlight, 1982
- The Carpenters – Voice of the Heart, 1983
- Neil Diamond – Primitive, 1984
- Chris Hillman – Desert Rose, 1984
- The Carpenters – An Old Fashioned Christmas, 1984
- The Maranatha! Singers – Praise Eight, 1986
- Elvis Costello – King of America, 1986
- Neil Diamond – Headed for the Future, 1986
- Phil Keaggy – The Wind and the Wheat, 1987
- Neil Diamond – Hot August Night II, 1987
- Los Lobos – By the Light of the Moon, 1987
- Roy Orbison – Roy Orbison and Friends: A Black and White Night, 1988
- The Carpenters – Lovelines, 1989
- Bob Bennett – Lord of the Past: A Compilation, 1989
- The Marantha Singers – We Shall Stand: The Spiritual Warfare Series, Vol. 2, 1990
- Neil Diamond – Lovescape, 1991
- Shelby Lynne – Temptation, 1993
- The Flying Burrito Brothers – Eye of a Hurricane, 1994
- Neil Diamond – Live in America, 1995
- Neil Diamond – Tennessee Moon, 1996
- Doc & Merle Watson – Watson Country, 1996
- Paul Overstreet – A Songwriter's Project, Vol. 1, 2000
- The Carpenters – As Time Goes By, 2001
- Jerry Garcia Band – Don't Let Go, 2001
- Neil Diamond – Three Chord Opera, 2001
- Jim Weatherly – Pictures & Rhymes, 2003
- Doc & Merle Watson – Sittin' Here Pickin' the Blues
- Jerry Garcia Band – Pure Jerry: Theatre 1839, San Francisco, July 29 & 30, 1977, 2004
- Jerry Garcia – All Good Things: Jerry Garcia Studio Sessions, 2004
- Scout Cloud Lee – Mountain Movin' Medicine, 2005
- Scout Cloud Lee – Love Medicine, 2005
- Jerry Garcia – Legion of Mary: The Jerry Garcia Collection, Vol. 1, 2005
- Jerry Garcia – Garcia Plays Dylan, 2005
- Doc & Merle Watson – Black Mountain Rag, 2006
- Jim Lauderdale & the Dream Players – Honey Songs, 2008
- John Wackerman – Drum Duets, Vol. 1, 2007
- Jim Lauderdale – Patchwork River, 2010
- Jerry Garcia / Legion of Mary – Garcia Live, Vol. 3: Dec 14-15, 1974 Northwest Tour, 2013
- Benny Hester – Benny…, 2016
- Jerry Garcia / Legion of Mary – Garcia Live Volume Seven, 2016
