= Garcia (1974 album) =

Studio album by Jerry Garcia
- Released: June 5, 1974
- Recorded: February 1974
- Genres: Roots rock, folk rock
- Length: 35:18
- Label: Round Records
- Producer: John Kahn

Jerry Garcia chronology
Live at Keystone (1973)	Garcia (1974)	Old & In the Way (1975)

Garcia, also known as Compliments, is the second solo album by Grateful Dead guitarist and singer Jerry Garcia. It was released on the Round Records label in June 1974. It includes one newly written song by John Kahn and Robert Hunter but is otherwise composed of cover versions. The album peaked at number 49 on the Billboard albums chart.

Originally titled Garcia, the album came to be called Compliments because early promotional copies had the words "compliments of" printed on the front cover, above the title Garcia. This helped to distinguish it from Garcia's first solo LP, which was also called Garcia. The title Compliments was officially adopted when the album was re-released in 1990. Early pressings of the album came in a "textured" cover.

Garcia was reissued in 2004 as part of the All Good Things box set, with ten bonus tracks comprising outtakes from the studio sessions.

It was released on 180-gram green vinyl, in a limited edition of 7,000 copies, as part of Record Store Day on April 18, 2015.

== Production ==
Garcia was produced by Jerry Garcia's frequent non-Grateful Dead musical collaborator and bassist John Kahn, who suggested most of the songs that were included on the album. In an interview, Kahn said, "It was mainly stuff that he wouldn't ordinarily thought of, and I think that was part of the challenge for him to try something that was really new for him." In another interview, Garcia said, "Most of those songs I didn't know, either, so I went in there like a studio vocalist, with the lyrics – most of them I'd only heard one or two times. That was one of the few times when I didn't really go on a trip about the material. I let John do the material selecting, except for a few suggestions like "Russian Lullaby", which was one of mine."

== Critical reception ==
Professional ratings
Review scores
Source	Rating
AllMusic	2/5 stars
Christgau's Record Guide	B−
Music Box	3.5/5 stars

In The Music Box, John Metzger wrote, "Over the years, Compliments has gotten a bad rap due to both the brevity of its tunes and the polish of the performances, but those looking for extended jams are simply missing the point. This was an opportunity for Garcia to do something different – to sing, to perform, and to arrange a variety of songs however he wanted. As a result, he surely sounded like he was having the time of his life..."

On AllMusic, Lindsay Planer said, "Backed by an A-list cast of studio heavies, covers such as the Rolling Stones' "Let's Spend the Night Together" and Van Morrison's "He Ain't Give You None" come off sounding slightly over-arranged. The converse, however, can be said of Garcia's intimately chilling reading of Peter Rowan's "Mississippi Moon", the slinky irrepressible Motown vibe on the Marvelettes' "The Hunter Gets Captured By the Game", and Little Milton's "That's What Love Will Make You Do" – all of which remained as staples of the Jerry Garcia Band's live catalog."

== Track listing ==
Side one

1. "Let It Rock" (Chuck Berry) – 3:12
2. "When the Hunter Gets Captured by the Game" (Smokey Robinson) – 3:46
3. "That's What Love Will Make You Do" (Henderson Thigpen, James Banks, Eddy Marion) – 3:42
4. "Russian Lullaby" (Irving Berlin) – 3:04
5. "Turn On The Bright Lights" (Albert Washington) – 5:04

Side two

1. "He Ain't Give You None" (Van Morrison) – 3:25
2. "What Goes Around" (Mac Rebennack) – 3:07
3. "Let's Spend the Night Together" (Jagger–Richards) – 3:40
4. "Mississippi Moon" (Peter Rowan) – 3:06
5. "Midnight Town" (Robert Hunter, John Kahn) – 3:12

The album was reissued in the All Good Things: Jerry Garcia Studio Sessions box set with the following bonus tracks:

11. "That's a Touch I Like" (Jesse Winchester) – 3:40
12. "(I'm a) Road Runner" (Brian Holland, Lamont Dozier, Eddie Holland) – 4:10
13. "It's Too Late (She's Gone)" (Chuck Willis) – 4:27
14. "I'll Forget You" (copyright control) – 3:21
15. "Tragedy" (Fred Burch, Gerald Nelson) – 3:52
16. "Think" (Deadric Malone, Jimmy McCracklin) – 4:12
17. "I Know It's a Sin" (Jimmy Reed) – 2:41
18. "Lonesome Town" (Thomas Baker Knight) – 6:19
19. "Cardiac Arrest (Studio Jam)" (Jerry Garcia, Kahn, Michael Omartian, Merl Saunders, Ron Tutt) – 1:39
20. "Back Home in Indiana" (James Hanley, Ballard McDonald) – 7:08

Note: Although credited to Albert Washington on this album, the song "Turn On the Bright Lights" is credited on Albert Washington's original single release to musician, producer, and songwriter Harry Carlson.

== Personnel ==
Musicians

- Jerry Garcia – guitar, vocals, classical guitar
- Arthur Adams – guitar
- Michael Omartian – piano, tack piano, Fender Rhodes
- John Kahn – bass, horn arrangement, string arrangement
- Ron Tutt – drums
- Merl Saunders – organ
- Larry Carlton – guitar

Production

- John Kahn – producer
- Ron Malo – engineer
- Richard Loren – production assistant
- Joshua Blardo – production assistant
- Ramrod – equipment
- Steve Parrish – equipment
- Victor Moscoso – cover artwork

Additional musicians

- Bobbye Hall – percussion on tracks 1–3 and 7–8
- Melvin Moore – trumpet on tracks 3 and 5
- Gene Connors – trombone on tracks 3 and 5, horn arrangement
- Jackie Kelso – saxophones on tracks 3 and 5
- Amos Garrett – trombone on tracks 4 and 7
- Joel Tepp – clarinet on track 4
- Richard Greene – violin on tracks 4 and 8
- Merry Clayton – background vocals on tracks 6 and 10
- Clydie King – background vocals on tracks 6 and 10
- Patty – background vocals on tracks 6 and 10
- Geoff Muldaur – clarinet on track 7
- Maria Muldaur – background vocals on track 8
- Ben Benay – rhythm guitar on track 9
- Tom Rose – clarinet on track 9
- John Rotella – e flat clarinet on track 9
- Willie Green – b flat clarinet on track 9
- Gary Ray – b flat clarinet on track 9
- Julian Sheer – bass clarinet on track 9
- Sid Page – violin on tracks 9–10
- Carl Pedersen – violin on tracks 9–10
- Nathan Rubin – violin on tracks 9–10
- Emily van Valkenburg – violin on tracks 9–10
- Miriam Dye – viola on tracks 9–10
- Nancy Ellis – viola on tracks 9–10
- Terry Adams – cello on tracks 9–10
- Judiyaba – cello on tracks 9–10
- Ray Siegal – string bass on tracks 9–10
- Arnie Egilsson – string bass on tracks 9–10
- Sid Sharp – contractor on tracks 9–10
- David Nichtern – guitar on track 20
- David Grisman – mandolin on track 20
- Vassar Clements – violin on track 20
