= Reflections (Jerry Garcia album) =

Studio album by Jerry Garcia
- Released: February 3, 1976
- Studios: His Masters Wheels, San Francisco
- Genres: Roots rock, folk rock
- Label: Round
- Producer: Jerry Garcia

Jerry Garcia chronology
Old & In the Way (1975)	Reflections (1976)	Cats Under the Stars (1978)

Professional ratings
Review scores
Source	Rating
AllMusic	4/5 stars
Christgau's Record Guide	B
Music Box	4.5/5 stars
Rolling Stone	(not rated)

Reflections is the third solo album by the Grateful Dead's guitarist Jerry Garcia, released on February 3, 1976. Partway through production, Garcia stopped recording with his solo band and brought in the members of the Grateful Dead, who performed on four songs, plus a bonus jam from 2004 release. Three of the four Grateful Dead-performed songs had earlier live debuts: "Comes a Time" (1971), "They Love Each Other" (1973) and "It Must Have Been the Roses" (1974); "Might as Well" entered their rotation in 1976, and "Mission in the Rain" received a select few performances that same year. Most of the songs entered the live rotation of the new Jerry Garcia Band as well.

Reflections was reissued with several bonus tracks as part of the All Good Things box set in 2004.

A 50th anniversary edition of the album was released in 2026 as a three-disc LP and digital download. The second disc contains the same outtakes as the 2004 edition, and the third disc contains live performances of some of the songs.

== Track listing ==
Side one
No.	Title	Writer(s)	Length
1.	"Might As Well"	Jerry Garcia, Robert Hunter	3:54
2.	"Mission In The Rain"	Garcia, Hunter	5:04
3.	"They Love Each Other"	Garcia, Hunter	4:37
4.	"I'll Take a Melody"	Allen Toussaint	9:28

Side two
No.	Title	Writer(s)	Length
5.	"It Must Have Been the Roses"	Hunter	5:29
6.	"Tore Up Over You"	Hank Ballard	4:30
7.	"Catfish John"	Bob McDill, Allen Reynolds	7:00
8.	"Comes a Time"	Garcia, Hunter	6:29

The album was reissued in the All Good Things: Jerry Garcia Studio Sessions box set with the following bonus tracks:

Bonus tracks
No.	Title	Writer(s)	Length
9.	"Mystery Train (Studio Jam)"	Junior Parker, Sam Phillips	5:12
10.	"All By Myself (Studio Jam)"	Dave Bartholomew, Fats Domino	4:10
11.	"Oh Babe, It Ain't No Lie"	Elizabeth Cotten	3:12
12.	"You Win Again"	Hank Williams	2:25
13.	"Orpheus"	Grateful Dead	16:44

The 50th anniversary edition added these live tracks:

Live tracks
No.	Title	Writer(s)	Length
14.	"They Love Each Other" (November 12th 1976)	Robert Hunter, Jerry Garcia	7:38
15.	"Catfish John" (February 25th 1976)	Bob McDill, Allen Reynolds	12:05
16.	"Tore Up Over You" (February 25th 1976)	Hank Ballard	13:49
17.	"Mission in the Rain" (October 17th 1975)	Robert Hunter, Jerry Garcia	5:56
Total length:			37:28

== Personnel ==
- Jerry Garcia – lead guitar, acoustic guitar, organ, synthesizer, percussion, chimes, vocals

Grateful Dead on "Might As Well", "They Love Each Other", "It Must Have Been the Roses", "Comes a Time", "Orpheus"

- Bob Weir – second guitar, background vocals
- Phil Lesh – bass
- Bill Kreutzmann – drums
- Keith Godchaux – Fender Rhodes, acoustic piano, tack piano
- Donna Jean Godchaux – background vocals ("Might as Well", "It Must Have Been the Roses")
- Mickey Hart – drums, percussion
- John Kahn – organ (on "They Love Each Other")

Jerry Garcia Band on "Mission in the Rain", "I'll Take a Melody", "Tore Up Over You", "Catfish John", "Mystery Train", "All By Myself", "Oh Babe, It Ain't No Lie", "You Win Again"

- Nicky Hopkins – piano
- Larry Knechtel – Fender Rhodes, piano
- John Kahn – bass, organ, synthesizer, vibraphone, clavinet
- Ron Tutt – drums
- Donna Jean Godchaux, Bob Weir – background vocals (on "I'll Take a Melody" and "Catfish John")
- Mickey Hart – percussion ("I'll Take a Melody", "Tore up over You", "Catfish John")

Production

- Engineer – Dan Healy
- Production assistants – Steve Brown, Kidd, Ramrod, Steve Parrish
- Cover – Mike Steirnagel
- Art direction – Ria Lewerke
- Second engineers – Rob Taylor, Willi Deenihan, Joel Edelstein
- Engineer & mix-down engineer – Smiggy
