= Cats Under the Stars =

Studio album by Jerry Garcia Band
- Released: April 15, 1978
- Genre: Roots rock, folk rock
- Length: 35:09
- Label: Arista
- Producer: Jerry Garcia & John Kahn

Jerry Garcia Band chronology
| Cats Under the Stars (1978) | Jerry Garcia Band (1991) |

Jerry Garcia chronology
| Reflections (1976) | Cats Under the Stars (1978) | Run for the Roses (1982) |

Cats Under the Stars is the only studio album by the American rock band the Jerry Garcia Band. Released in 1978 on Arista Records, the album was the first release by the group, which was a long-running side project of Grateful Dead singer and guitarist Jerry Garcia. While the band continued until 1995, they were primarily a live concert act following the release of Cats Under the Stars and never recorded another studio effort. Grateful Dead members Keith and Donna Godchaux, who were at the time also part of the Garcia Band, contributed to the album.

== Recording and release ==
The album was the first to be recorded at the Grateful Dead's Club Front in San Rafael, a warehouse space that had been acquired for band rehearsals and then converted to a studio. Garcia explained "[Ron] Tutt liked the drum sound in the room and we hadn't really thought about it before, so we whipped the place into a recording studio."

The record was not a financial success, but it remained Garcia's favorite, as he said in an interview in the late 1980s: "The record I worked hardest at and liked best was Cats Under the Stars. That was kind of like my baby. It did worse than any other record I ever did. I think I probably gave away more copies than I sold. It was amazingly, pathetically bad. But I’ve learned not to invest a lot of importance in 'em, although it's nice to care about your work."

On another occasion in the early '80s he said "Cats Under the Stars is my favorite one. That's the one that I’m happiest with, from every point of view in which I operate on that record. We did all those tunes on tour right after the album came out, with John and Maria, Keith and Donna and I think Ronnie Tutt was still playing drums with us on those first few tours." (Although Ron Tutt played on the album, he left the band before the album was released and was replaced by Buzz Buchanan.)

In the early '90s he still thought well of the album: "As far as I'm concerned Cats Under the Stars is my most successful record — even though it's my least successful record! I've always loved it and it just never went anywhere." In an interview with Joel Selvin he was more succinct; "[Cats Under the Stars] had everything — chops, production, songs."

Cats Under the Stars peaked at No. 114 on the Billboard 200.

"Rubin and Cherise" was the only song from the album to be subsequently performed by the Grateful Dead, who debuted the song in concert in 1991.

== Critical reception ==
Professional ratings
Review scores
| Source | Rating |
|---|---|
| Allmusic | 4/5 stars |
| Christgau's Record Guide | C+ |
| Music Box | 3.5/5 stars |

On AllMusic, Lindsay Planer wrote, "Jerry Garcia's fourth solo album was the first to be released under the collective title of the Jerry Garcia Band... However, unlike his previous effort, Cats Under the Stars contains all new original material.... Many Deadheads and critics alike feel as if Cats Under the Stars is Garcia's best non-Dead effort..."

== Track listing ==
Side one

1. "Rubin And Cherise" (Robert Hunter, Jerry Garcia) – 5:17
2. "Love In The Afternoon" (Hunter, John Kahn) – 4:09
3. "Palm Sunday" (Hunter, Garcia) – 2:21
4. "Cats Under The Stars" (Hunter, Garcia) – 5:31

Side two

1. "Rhapsody In Red" (Hunter, Garcia, Kahn) – 5:11
2. "Rain" (Donna Godchaux) – 5:53
3. "Down Home" (Kahn) – 1:46
4. "Gomorrah" (Hunter, Garcia) – 5:26

The album was reissued in the All Good Things: Jerry Garcia Studio Sessions box set with the following bonus tracks:

9. "Magnificent Sanctuary Band" (Dorsey Burnette) – 3:50
10. "I'll Be With Thee" (Dorothy Love Coates) – 6:01
11. "The Way You Do the Things You Do" (Smokey Robinson, Robert "Bobby" Rogers) – 5:01
12. "Mighty High" (David Crawford, Richard Downing) – 3:04
13. "Don't Let Go" (Jesse Stone) – 15:59
14. "Down Home" (Rehearsal Version) (Kahn) – 1:49
15. "Palm Sunday" (Alternate Take) (Hunter, Garcia) – 2:24

Tracks 9 & 11-13 are from a rehearsal session in November 1976.

== Personnel ==
Jerry Garcia Band

- Jerry Garcia - guitar, vocals
- Donna Jean Godchaux - vocals
- Keith Godchaux - keyboards, background vocals
- John Kahn - basses, keyboards, guitar, orchestration
- Ron Tutt - drums, percussion
- Maria Muldaur - background vocals on tracks 2, 8 & 10

Additional musicians

- Merl Saunders - organ
- Stephen Schuster - flute, clarinet, saxophone
- Brian Godchaux - violin
- Candy Godchaux - violin

Production

- Engineers - Betty Cantor-Jackson, Bob Matthews
- Assistants - Harry Popick, Steve Parrish, Bill Candelario, Ramrod
- Cover art - Kelly Mouse Studios
