= Run for the Roses (album) =

Studio album by Jerry Garcia
- Released: 1982
- Recorded: September–December 1981
- Genre: Roots rock, folk rock
- Length: 34:50
- Label: Arista
- Producer: Jerry Garcia, John Kahn

Jerry Garcia chronology
Cats Under the Stars (1978)	Run for the Roses (1982)	Vintage NRPS (1986)

Professional ratings
Review scores
Source	Rating
AllMusic	1.5/5 stars
The Encyclopedia of Popular Music	3/5 stars
The Music Box	3/5 stars
The Rolling Stone Album Guide	3/5 stars

Run for the Roses is the fourth and final solo album by the American musician Jerry Garcia, released in 1982. It was recorded during a period when Garcia began to have health issues.

== Track listing ==
This side

1. "Run for the Roses" (Jerry Garcia, Robert Hunter) – 3:30
2. "I Saw Her Standing There" (John Lennon, Paul McCartney) – 2:53
3. "Without Love" (Danny Small) – 4:22
4. "Midnight Getaway" (Jerry Garcia, John Kahn, Robert Hunter) – 7:46

That side

1. "Leave The Little Girl Alone" (John Kahn, Robert Hunter) – 3:33
2. "Valerie" (Jerry Garcia, Robert Hunter) – 5:19
3. "Knockin' on Heaven's Door" (Bob Dylan) – 7:27

Bonus tracks (All Good Things box set):

8. "Fennario" (Traditional) (aka Peggy-O)
9. "Alabama Getaway" (Jerry Garcia, Robert Hunter)
10. "Tangled Up in Blue" (Bob Dylan)
11. "Simple Twist of Fate" (Bob Dylan)
12. "Dear Prudence" (John Lennon, Paul McCartney)
13. "Valerie" alternative mix (Jerry Garcia, Robert Hunter)

== Personnel ==
Musicians

- Jerry Garcia – guitar, vocals
- John Kahn – bass, fretless bass, synthesizer, piano, clavinet, guitar
- Ron Tutt – drums, percussion
- Melvin Seals – organ
- Merl Saunders – organ
- James Warren – piano, clavinet
- Michael O'Martian – piano, clavinet
- Michael Neuman – trumpet
- Liz Stires – vocals
- Julie Stafford – vocals

Production

- Produced by Jerry Garcia, John Kahn
- Recording: Betty Cantor-Jackson, Ron Malo
- Mixing: Bob Matthews
- Mastering: George Horn
- Artwork: Victor Moscoso
