= Laurence Shurtliff =

American music executive and roadie

- Born: April 19, 1945; Pendleton, Oregon, U.S.
- Died: May 17, 2006 (aged 61); Petaluma, California, U.S.
- Other names: Lawrence Shurtliff; Ram Rod
- Occupations: Roadie; Music executive
- Known for: Roadie for the Grateful Dead

Laurence Shurtliff (April 19, 1945 – May 17, 2006) (also spelled Lawrence Shurtliff and a.k.a., Ram Rod) was an American music executive and roadie. He was president of Grateful Dead Productions, Inc., from 1976, the year that the Grateful Dead incorporated, until the death of guitarist Jerry Garcia in 1995. He also was the Grateful Dead's "head roadie" and equipment manager during and prior to those years, and began his first role with the band as tour truck driver in 1967.

In 1972, Shurtliff co-produced Jerry Garcia's Warner Bros. Records solo album, titled Garcia, along with Bob Matthews, Betty Cantor and Bill Kreutzmann.

Shurtliff received his nickname "Ram Rod" from Neal Cassady of the Merry Pranksters, while traveling through Mexico with author Ken Kesey. "I am Ramon Rodriguez Rodriguez, the famous Mexican guide," he had boasted, and after he successfully "ramrodded" seven adults into a Volkswagen Bug, Cassady bestowed the nickname upon him.

An auction of Shurtliff's collection of Grateful Dead memorabilia by Bonhams & Butterfields Auctioneers in San Francisco on May 8, 2007, netted more than $1.1 million. The collection included several guitars that had been owned by Garcia, including a cream-colored Travis Bean electric guitar that sold for $312,000.
