= Jerry Garcia Band (album) =

Live album by Jerry Garcia Band
- Released: August 27, 1991
- Recorded: April–August 1990
- Genres: Rock, rhythm and blues
- Label: Arista
- Producers: Jerry Garcia; John Kahn; John Cutler

Jerry Garcia Band chronology
Cats Under the Stars (1978)	Jerry Garcia Band (1991)	How Sweet It Is (1997)

Jerry Garcia chronology
Jerry Garcia / David Grisman (1991)	Jerry Garcia Band (1991)	Fire Up Plus (1992)

Jerry Garcia Band is the second album, and first live album, by the Jerry Garcia Band. It was recorded in the spring and summer of 1990 at The Warfield in San Francisco. It was released by Arista Records as a two-disc CD in August 1991. It was released as a five-disc LP on December 3, 2021.

== Critical reception ==
Professional ratings
Review scores
Source	Rating
Allmusic	4/5 stars

On Allmusic, Lindsay Planer said, "The quartet is led by Jerry Garcia and features longtime Garcia associate John Kahn (bass), Melvin Seals (keyboards), David Kemper (drums), Gloria Jones (vocals), and Jackie LaBranch (vocals). The selections accurately image the wide spectrum of pop, R&B, rock and soul covers Garcia and company played circa the late '80s and early '90s.... Garcia's rush upon rush of incendiary fretwork equals the verve in practically any Grateful Dead rendering during the early '90s. However, the primary focus is divided between the superior choice of material and equally adroit execution.... The initiated and initially curious alike will find much to enjoy and discover throughout Jerry Garcia Band."

== Track listing ==
Disc one
No.	Title	Writer(s)	Length
1.	"The Way You Do the Things You Do"	Smokey Robinson; Bobby Rogers	8:08
2.	"Waiting for a Miracle"	Bruce Cockburn	5:54
3.	"Simple Twist of Fate"	Bob Dylan	11:54
4.	"Get Out of My Life"	Allen Toussaint	8:53
5.	"My Sisters and Brothers"	Charles Johnson	4:17
6.	"I Shall Be Released"	Dylan	9:26
7.	"Dear Prudence"	John Lennon; Paul McCartney	11:41
8.	"Deal"	Jerry Garcia; Robert Hunter	8:38

Disc two
No.	Title	Writer(s)	Length
1.	"Stop That Train"	Peter Tosh	8:51
2.	"Señor (Tales of Yankee Power)"	Dylan	7:43
3.	"Evangeline"	David Hidalgo; Louie Pérez	4:47
4.	"The Night They Drove Old Dixie Down"	Robbie Robertson	9:36
5.	"Don't Let Go"	Jesse Stone	17:16
6.	"That Lucky Old Sun"	Haven Gillespie; Beasley Smith	11:32
7.	"Tangled Up in Blue"	Dylan	12:16

== Recording dates ==
Recording dates
Title	Date
"My Sisters and Brothers"	April 14, 1990; Warfield Theatre, San Francisco, California
"The Way You Do the Things You Do"	April 15, 1990; Warfield Theatre, San Francisco, California
"Simple Twist of Fate"	April 15, 1990; Warfield Theatre, San Francisco, California
"Stop That Train"	April 15, 1990; Warfield Theatre, San Francisco, California
"Señor (Tales of Yankee Power)"	April 15, 1990; Warfield Theatre, San Francisco, California
"Evangeline"	April 15, 1990; Warfield Theatre, San Francisco, California
"Don't Let Go"	April 15, 1990; Warfield Theatre, San Francisco, California
"Deal"	August 7, 1990; Warfield Theatre, San Francisco, California
"I Shall Be Released"	August 8, 1990; Warfield Theatre, San Francisco, California
"Dear Prudence"	August 8, 1990; Warfield Theatre, San Francisco, California
"Tangled Up in Blue"	August 8, 1990; Warfield Theatre, San Francisco, California
"Waiting for a Miracle"	August 9, 1990; Warfield Theatre, San Francisco, California
"Get Out of My Life"	August 9, 1990; Warfield Theatre, San Francisco, California
"The Night They Drove Old Dixie Down"	August 9, 1990; Warfield Theatre, San Francisco, California
"That Lucky Old Sun"	August 9, 1990; Warfield Theatre, San Francisco, California

== Personnel ==
Jerry Garcia Band

- Jerry Garcia – guitar, vocals
- John Kahn – bass guitar
- Melvin Seals – organ, keyboards
- David Kemper – drums
- Jackie LaBranch – background vocals
- Gloria Jones – background vocals

Production

- Producer – Jerry Garcia, John Kahn & John Cutler
- Live recording – John Cutler
- Additional engineers – David Roberts, Andrew Warwick, Peter Miller & Justin Kreutzmann
- Digital mastering & editing – Joe Gastwirt
- Cover art – John Kahn
- Photography – Ken Friedman
- Design – Carolyn Quan
- Art coordination – Amy Finkle
