= Garcia (1972 album) =

Studio album by Jerry Garcia
- Released: January 20, 1972
- Recorded: July 1971
- Genre: Folk rock; psychedelic rock; country; country rock; electronic; musique concrète
- Length: 40:00
- Label: Warner Bros.
- Producer: Bob Matthews, Betty Cantor and Bill Kreutzmann

Jerry Garcia chronology
Hooteroll? (1971)	Garcia (1972)	Live at Keystone (1973)

Singles from Garcia
- 1. "Sugaree" Released: 1972; 2. "The Wheel" Released: 1972

Garcia is the first solo album by Grateful Dead guitarist and singer Jerry Garcia. It was released in January 1972.

Warner Bros. Records offered the Grateful Dead the opportunity to cut their own solo records, and Garcia was released around the same time as Bob Weir's Ace and Mickey Hart's Rolling Thunder. Unlike Ace, which was practically a Grateful Dead album, Garcia was more of a solo effort, as Garcia played all the instrumental parts save the drums. Six tracks (specifically those coauthored by lyricist Robert Hunter) eventually became standards in the Grateful Dead concert repertoire, especially "The Wheel", which was performed over 250 times.

Considered a showcase for Garcia's work on electric and pedal steel guitar, Garcia is considered more electric and psychedelic than then-recent Grateful Dead albums, balancing country and country rock material on the first side with experimental and musique concrète pieces on the second side, which commences with several sound collages of effects. Other styles explored include folk rock, gospel and acid rock. Garcia described the record as a lighthearted project.

Some reprints of the album are self-released. "Loser" was covered by Cracker on their 1993 album Kerosene Hat.

== Background and release ==
Garcia explained to an interviewer before the record's completion: "What I'm going to do is what I would do if I had 16-track at home, I'm just going to goof around with it. And I don't want anyone to think that it's me being serious or anything like that – it's really me goofing around'." After the album's release, he described it as "overindulgent".

Garcia recorded the album almost entirely by himself, with only Bill Kreutzmann assisting him. As music journalist Andy Childs explains: "Garcia is very nearly a true solo album as Jerry plays all the instruments except drums, which Bill Kreutzmann handles." The compositions were written by Garcia with lyricist Robert Hunter. Released in January 1972, Garcia precedes the next "true" Grateful Dead solo album, Bob Weir's Ace (July 1972), which differs from Garcia in that it features all members of the Grateful Dead. Garcia reached number 35 on the Billboard Top LPs & Tape chart, where it spent 14 weeks.

== Composition ==
Andy Childs of ZigZag describes Garcia as a strange mixture of Grateful Dead-style country music and "weird, atmospheric electronic pieces with equally strange titles", such as "Spidergawd" and "Eep Hour". Music critic Lindsay Planer writes that each song features a unique arrangement, ranging from straightforward blues-styled rock and roll ("Sugaree") to avant-garde music ("Late for Supper"), with other songs between those extremes exploring noir folk ("Loser"), balladry ("Bird Song") and "cyclical" psychedelia ("The Wheel"). Robert Christgau describes side one of the album as a set of catchy and groovy songs, and side two as a musique concrète experiment. David Browne notes that the record showcases Garcia's electric and pedal steel guitar skills, while the "sound-effect collages", such as "Eep Hour", exhibit the Grateful Dead's "oddball tendencies". Andrew Sacher considers it to be more electric and psychedelic than the recent Grateful Dead albums Workingman's Dead and American Beauty (both 1970), occupying territory between those records and the more "song-oriented moments" on Aoxomoxoa (1969).

Side one contains four songs, likened by reviewer Richard Williams as "an electrified follow-up" to Workingman's Dead, adding that the songs share the "same mythical-themes", with both "Deal" and "Loser" being based around a gambling motif. He also noted the "rhythmic freshness" on side one, as "even when the standard rock pattern is employed, on 'Loser', it's given a new twist and a lighter, more floating feeling." "Deal" is a folk rock song that has been compared to American Beauty, albeit with a harder edge due to the overdriven pedal steel. A tribute to Janis Joplin, "Bird Song" was a "harder and more psychedelic rocker" than any Grateful Dead song since the 1960s, and features melodic countours typical of Garcia with acoustic guitar in the background, before climaxing with acid rock soloing. Hunter's lyrics were inspired by a line written by poet Edna St. Vincent Millay. "Sugaree" is a spacious song with a pop hook, jangling acoustic guitar and touches of psychedelia in the treated electric guitar lead.

Side two is more experimental, beginning with two musique concrète pieces–"Late for Supper" and "Spidergawd"–that combine gongs, jabbering voices and a collage of found sounds. "Spidergawd", described by Ken Hunt as a "sound-collage, tape-loop extravangaza", features an uncredited appearance from Hunter, who delivers the track's nonsensical narration "about Oppenheimer, et al", and segues into "Eep Hour", a track with an uncluttered, eerie guitar tone and manipulation of steel guitar over other instruments in a manner which has been compared to Pink Floyd. Together, "Late for Supper", "Spidergawd" and "Eep Hour" form a trippy medley, returning to the studio experimentation that typified the Grateful Dead's Anthem of the Sun (1968) and Aoxomoxoa. In biographer Tony Sclafani's opinion, "Late for Supper" and "Spidergawd" mark Garcia's forays into "atonal avant garde piano music", while on the third, "Eep Hour", he showcases his synthesizer skills. "To Lay Me Down" is a love song in a straightforward gospel/country arrangement, while the psychedelic closer "The Wheel" exhibits Garcia's short-lived infatuation with pedal steel guitar.

== Critical reception ==
Professional ratings
Review scores
Source	Rating
AllMusic	4.5/5 stars
Encyclopedia of Popular Music	3/5 stars
The Great Rock Discography	7/10
The Music Box	4/5 stars
Pitchfork	8.6/10
The Village Voice	B+

In their review, Billboard described Garcia as a "expertly wrought, impressive effort". They highlighted the record's mellow mood and Garcia's warm voice, and recommended "Deal" and "the cosmic collage" "Late for Supper". In Melody Maker, Williams wrote that the album contains "several very attractive songs and a couple of tracks which represent the more adventurous side of the guitarist's personality." He believed that it was inferior to Hooteroll? (1971) as a representation of Garcia's guitar work, but added that Garcia contains "a good, honest feeling" which would appeal to the musician's fans. "I'd be happier", he added, "if the singing was better; it does seem a waste, when the songs are so substantial."

Writing for The Village Voice, Christgau contended that side one was "almost too pleasant and catchy", believing that Hunter and Garcia, despite being "the most consistent songwriters of the past few years," had become too content with their sound. He considered side two's musique concrète experimentation to succeed, with the overall album satisfactorily balancing "non-pretension and pretension", but considered it uncompelling. He repeated his criticisms of side one in Christgau's Record Guide (1981), considering it to work too closely within the Dead's "slow, traditional, blues-tinged country-rock groove", but praised "Sugaree" and "Deal" as classics, and expressed surprise that side two's musique concrète was "surprisingly unpretentious".

Reviewing the album retrospectively for AllMusic, Planer dismissed Garcia's description of it as "overindulgent", praising the record as "a full-bodied artistic expression from one of rock & roll's most multi-faceted musicians." He wrote that both Deadheads and "enthusiasts of the burgeoning early-'70s singer/songwriter movement" would enjoy the album, as the musician "redefines his immense talents and seemingly undiluted musical potential." Writing in The Rough Guide to Rock (1999), Ken Hunt called it a "more decisive work" than Hooteroll? and named it one of his three key albums. In an article for Rolling Stone, Browne wrote that Garcia "conjures both the singing-gambler and mad-musical-scientist sides of the Dead on what is arguably the best outside-mothership project." In an article for ZigZag, Childs wrote that, although regarded by Garcia as a "goof", the record is "pretty fine", praising the "perfect" production and commenting that it is "a superb showcase for Garcia's ability as an incredibly versatile musician." Sclafani considers the album to be "essential listening". In Uncut, Max Bell wrote that Garcia was "recorded on a high" and wrote that it "combined American Beauty precision with electronic wizardry, transforming 'Spidergawd' into the blood-rush of 'The Wheel'."

== Legacy ==
Six songs from the album became live concert staples for the Grateful Dead–"Sugaree", "Deal", "Bird Song", "Loser", "To Lay Me Down" and "The Wheel". The latter song in particular was performed over 250 times by the band until their split in 1995. Furthermore, the medley of "Late for Supper", "Spidergawd" and "Eep Hour" featured as background music in the opening of The Grateful Dead Movie (1977). "Eep Hour" was once used in an advertisement for Cher's perfume brand, while "Spidergawd" later gave its name to a 2020s hard rock band.

In 2018, Andrew Sacher of Brooklyn Vegan ranked Garcia third in his rankings of the Grateful Dead studio albums; he wrote that it deserved as much attention as Workingman's Dead and American Beauty, praising Garcia's singing and songwriting. He wrote that listeners wanting an entire album like "Ripple" and "Friend of the Devil" (both from American Beauty) would possibly find Garcia to be that album. In a discussion on atonality in rock music, Walter Everett wrote that electronic tracks such as "Late for Supper" and "Spidergawd" (alongside the Beatles' "Revolution 9" and Pink Floyd's "On the Run") were radical for disregarding tonal centricity with "greater conviction and more powerful results" than other popular music.

Musician, DJ, and producer LP Giobbi, at the request of the Garcia Estate, remixed the album to coincide with its 50th anniversary. It was released in 2023 as Garcia (Remixed).. In addition to a CD release, this mix was released on vinyl as a double album, including the eight bonus tracks previously released as part of the All Good Things: Jerry Garcia Studio Sessions box set (noted below) as the second disk. Side one of disk 2 contained tracks 11-13 listed below with tracks 14-18 on side two.

== Track listing ==
=== Side one ===
1. "Deal" (Robert Hunter, Jerry Garcia) – 3:14
2. "Bird Song" (Hunter, Garcia) – 4:26
3. "Sugaree" (Hunter, Garcia) – 5:54
4. "Loser" (Hunter, Garcia) – 4:10

=== Side two ===
1. "Late for Supper" (Garcia, Bill Kreutzmann) – 1:37
2. "Spidergawd" (Garcia, Kreutzmann) – 3:25
3. "Eep Hour" (Garcia, Kreutzmann) – 5:08
4. "To Lay Me Down" (Hunter, Garcia) – 6:18
5. "An Odd Little Place" (Garcia, Kreutzmann) – 1:38
6. "The Wheel" (Hunter, Garcia, Kreutzmann) – 4:12

The album was reissued in the All Good Things: Jerry Garcia Studio Sessions box set with the following bonus tracks:

11. "Sugaree" (Alternate Take) (Hunter, Garcia) – 7:13
12. "Loser" (Alternate Take) (Hunter, Garcia) – 4:06
13. "Late For Supper / Spidergawd / Eep Hour" (Alternate Takes) (Garcia, Kreutzmann)
14. "The Wheel" (Alternate Take #1) (Hunter, Garcia) – 4:04
15. "The Wheel" (Alternate Take #2) (Hunter, Garcia) – 2:53
16. "Study for EEP Hour" (Garcia, Kreutzmann) – 3:30
17. "Dealin' from the Bottom" (Studio Jam) (Garcia, Kreutzmann) – 1:25
18. "Study for the Wheel" (Garcia, Kreutzmann) – 3:22

The album with these same eight bonus tracks was reissued as a double album on vinyl in 2022 in celebration of the 50th anniversary of the album's initial release. The second disk had tracks 11-13 above on one side and tracks 14-18 on the other.

Additionally, a vinyl pressing (GDV 4003) was made in West Germany for Grateful Dead Records (48-50 Steele Road, London NW10 7AS) and released in 1988. The tracks are the same as the 1972 original. Inexplicably, the labels on the vinyl record itself read "Grateful Dead - The Wheel" at the top, with "Jerry Garcia" appearing as a subheading at the bottom, below the track lists.

== Personnel ==
=== Musicians ===
- Jerry Garcia – acoustic guitar, electric guitar, pedal steel guitar, bass, piano, organ, samples, vocals, mixing
- Bill Kreutzmann – drums

=== Production ===
- Bob Matthews – producer, engineer, mixing
- Betty Cantor – producer, engineer, mixing
- Ramrod – producer, engineer, mixing, production assistant
- Bill Kreutzmann – production assistant
- Bob Seidemann – cover photo and album design
- Herb Greene – Garcia photo
