= Sugaree =

Single by Jerry Garcia

from the album Garcia
- B-side: "Eep Hour"
- Released: January 1972
- Recorded: 1971
- Genre: Folk rock
- Length: 5:54
- Label: Warner Bros. Records
- Composer: Jerry Garcia
- Lyricist: Robert Hunter
- Producers: Bob Matthews; Betty Cantor; Bill Kreutzmann

"Sugaree" is a song with lyrics by long-time Grateful Dead lyricist Robert Hunter and music by guitarist Jerry Garcia. It was written for Jerry Garcia's first solo album Garcia, which was released in January 1972. As with the songs on the rest of the album, Garcia plays every instrument himself except drums, played by Bill Kreutzmann, including acoustic guitar, bass guitar, and an electric guitar played through a Leslie speaker. Released as a single from the Garcia album, "Sugaree" peaked at #94 on the Billboard Hot 100 in April 1972 and was Garcia's only single ever on that chart.

The song was first performed live by the Grateful Dead on July 31, 1971, at the Yale Bowl at Yale University, as was the song "Mr. Charlie". They played the song in numerous other concerts, including those later released as Dick's Picks Volume 3 and One from the Vault.

== Predecessors ==
Elizabeth Cotten, the North Carolina folksinger, wrote and recorded a song called "Shake Sugaree" in 1966. The chorus of Cotten's song is "Oh lordie me/Didn't I shake sugaree?" Hunter was aware of this song when he wrote "Sugaree."

== References in popular culture ==
The song is mentioned in Stephen King's 1981 novel Cujo.

The Persuasions included this song on their 2000 album of Grateful Dead covers, Might as Well… The Persuasions Sing Grateful Dead.

Graham Parker covered the track on his 2004 album, Your Country.

Jackie Greene recorded a cover for his 2009 release The Grateful EP.

On the 2016 charity album Day of the Dead, "Sugaree" was covered by Jenny Lewis and the band Phosphorescent.

== See also ==
- Dark Star
- Musical improvisation
