= Jerry Garcia =

American guitarist and singer (1942–1995)

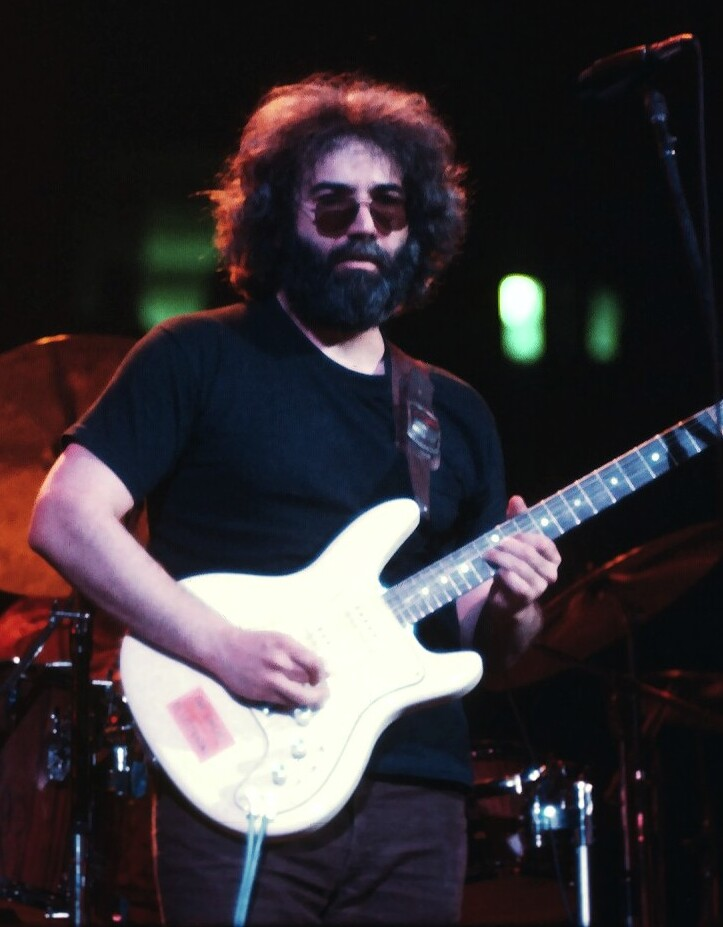
- Garcia performing in 1977
- Born: Jerome John Garcia; August 1, 1942; San Francisco, California, U.S.
- Died: August 9, 1995 (aged 53); Forest Knolls, California, U.S.
- Occupations: Musician; songwriter
- Years active: 1960–1995
- Spouses: Sara Ruppenthal (m. 1963; div. 1967); Carolyn Adams (m. 1981; div. 1994); Manasha Matheson (m. 1990; div. 1992); Deborah Koons (m. 1994)
- Children: 4
- Musical career
- Genres: Rock; psychedelia; jam band; bluegrass; blues; jazz; folk; rock and roll; Americana
- Instruments: Guitar; vocals; pedal steel guitar; banjo
- Works: Jerry Garcia discography
- Labels: Rhino; Arista; Warner Bros.; Acoustic Disc; Grateful Dead
- Formerly of: Grateful Dead; New Riders of the Purple Sage; Old & In the Way; Legion of Mary; Jerry Garcia Band; Reconstruction; Jerry Garcia Acoustic Band
- Website: jerrygarcia.com

Jerome John Garcia (August 1, 1942 – August 9, 1995) was an American musician who was the lead guitarist and a vocalist with the rock band Grateful Dead, which he co-founded and which came to prominence during the counterculture of the 1960s. Although he disavowed the role, Garcia was viewed by many as the leader of the band. He was inducted into the Rock and Roll Hall of Fame in 1994 as a member of the Grateful Dead.

As one of its founders, Garcia performed with the Grateful Dead for the band's entire 30-year career (1965–1995). Garcia also founded and participated in a variety of side projects, including the Saunders–Garcia Band (with longtime friend Merl Saunders), the Jerry Garcia Band, Old & In the Way, the Garcia/Grisman and Garcia/Kahn acoustic duos, Legion of Mary, and New Riders of the Purple Sage (which he co-founded with John Dawson and David Nelson). He also released several solo albums, and contributed to a number of albums by other artists over the years as a session musician. He was well known for his distinctive guitar playing, and was ranked 13th in Rolling Stone's "100 Greatest Guitarists of All Time" cover story in 2003. In the 2015 version of the list he was ranked at #46. In 2023, Garcia was ranked 34th by Rolling Stone.

Garcia was renowned for his musical and technical ability, particularly his ability to play a variety of instruments and sustain long improvisations. Garcia believed that improvisation took stress away from his playing and allowed him to make spur of the moment decisions that he would not have made intentionally. In a 1993 interview with Rolling Stone, Garcia noted that "my own preferences are for improvisation, for making it up as I go along. The idea of picking, of eliminating possibilities by deciding, that's difficult for me". Originating from the days of the "Acid Tests", these improvisations were a form of exploration rather than playing a song already written.

Later in life, Garcia struggled with diabetes. On July 10, 1986, he went into a diabetic coma and nearly died. Although his overall health improved somewhat after the incident, he continued to struggle with obesity, smoking, and long-standing heroin and cocaine addictions. He was staying in a California drug rehabilitation facility when he died of a heart attack in August 1995.

== Early life ==
Jerome John Garcia was born in the Excelsior District of San Francisco, California, on August 1, 1942, to Jose Ramon "Joe" Garcia, whose paternal ancestors were from Galicia in northwest Spain, and Ruth Marie "Bobbie" (née Clifford) Garcia, (Note: "In the early 1930s[...]Jose met Ruth Marie Clifford[...]they got married in 1934[...]they made their new home in San Francisco[...]in the blue-collar Excelsior District." Jerry's mom, Ruth (also known as "Bobbie" to her family)...) who was herself born in San Francisco and was of Irish and Swedish descent. His parents named him after composer Jerome Kern. Jerome had an older brother, Clifford Ramon "Tiff", who was born in 1937. Shortly before Clifford's birth, their father and a partner leased a building in downtown San Francisco and turned it into a bar, partly in response to Jose being blackballed from a musicians' union for moonlighting. (Note: "During the Depression, the musicians union had what was called the Seven-Day Law, which prohibited members from working seven nights a week in order to spread the scarce work to as many members as possible. Typically, those who had steady jobs would play five nights a week and have two free nights. To supplement his income, Jose had been working a second job on his off-nights, and when the union found out, Jose was expelled.")

Garcia was raised as a Catholic. He was influenced by music at an early age, taking piano lessons for much of his childhood. His father was a retired professional musician and his mother enjoyed playing the piano. His father's extended family—which had immigrated from Spain in 1919—would often sing during reunions.

In 1946, when Garcia was four years old, two-thirds of his right middle finger was cut off by his brother in a wood splitting accident while the family vacationed in the Santa Cruz Mountains. Garcia later confessed that he often used the severed finger to his advantage in his youth, showing it off to other children in his neighborhood.

Less than a year after this incident, his father died in a fly fishing accident when the family was vacationing near Arcata in Northern California. He slipped after entering the Trinity River, part of the Six Rivers National Forest, and drowned before other fishermen could reach him. Although Garcia claimed he saw the incident, Dennis McNally, author of the book A Long Strange Trip: The Inside Story of the Grateful Dead, argues that Garcia formed the memory after hearing others repeat the story. Blair Jackson, who wrote Garcia: An American Life, notes that a local newspaper article describing Jose's death did not mention Jerry being present when he died.

=== Excelsior District ===
Following his father's death, Garcia's mother Ruth took over her husband's bar, buying out his partner for full ownership. She began working full-time there, sending Jerry and his brother to live nearby with her parents, Tillie and William Clifford. During the five-year period in which he lived with his grandparents, Garcia enjoyed autonomy and he attended Monroe Elementary School. At the school, Garcia was greatly encouraged in his artistic abilities by his third grade teacher: through her, he discovered that "being a creative person was a viable possibility in life." According to Garcia, it was around this time that he was opened up to country and bluegrass music by his grandmother, whom he recalled enjoyed listening to the Grand Ole Opry. His elder brother, Clifford, however, staunchly believed the contrary, insisting that Garcia was "fantasizing all [that] ... she'd been to Opry, but she didn't listen to it on the radio." It was at this point that Garcia started playing the banjo, his first stringed instrument.

=== Menlo Park ===
In 1953, Garcia's mother married Wally Matusiewicz. Subsequently, Garcia and his brother moved back home with their mother and new stepfather. However, due to the roughneck reputation of their neighborhood at the time, Garcia's mother moved their family to Menlo Park. During their stay in Menlo Park, Garcia became acquainted with racism and antisemitism, things he disliked intensely. The same year, Garcia was also introduced to rock and roll and rhythm and blues by his brother, and enjoyed listening to Ray Charles, John Lee Hooker, B. B. King, Hank Ballard, and, later, Chuck Berry. Clifford often memorized the vocals for his favorite songs, and would then make Garcia learn the harmony parts, a move to which Garcia later attributed much of his early ear training.

In mid-1957, Garcia began smoking cigarettes and was introduced to marijuana. Garcia would later reminisce about the first time he smoked marijuana: "Me and a friend of mine went up into the hills with two joints, the San Francisco foothills, and smoked these joints and just got so high and laughed and roared and went skipping down the streets doing funny things and just having a helluva time". During this time, Garcia also studied at what is now the San Francisco Art Institute. There he was taught by Wally Hedrick, an artist who came to prominence during the 1960s. During the classes he often encouraged Garcia to draw and paint, noting that Garcia had skill in both areas. Hedrick also introduced Garcia to the fiction of Jack Kerouac, whom Garcia later cited as a major influence.

=== San Francisco ===
In June, Garcia graduated from the local Menlo Oaks school. He then moved with his family back to San Francisco, where they lived in an apartment above the family bar, a newly built replacement for the original, which had been torn down to make way for a freeway entrance. Two months later, on Garcia's fifteenth birthday, his mother bought an accordion for him, to his great disappointment. Garcia had long been captivated by many rhythm and blues artists, especially Chuck Berry, Elmore James and Bo Diddley, leaving him craving an electric guitar. After some pleading, his mother exchanged the accordion for a Danelectro with a small amplifier at a local pawnshop. Garcia's stepfather, who was somewhat proficient with instruments, helped tune his guitar to an unusual open tuning.

=== Cazadero ===
After a short stint at Denman Junior High School, Garcia attended tenth grade at Balboa High School in 1958, where he often got into trouble for skipping classes and fighting. Consequently, in 1959, Garcia's mother again moved the family to a safer environment, to Cazadero, a small town in Sonoma County, 90 miles (140 km) north of San Francisco. This turn of events did not sit well with Garcia, who had to travel by bus thirty miles (50 km) to Analy High School in Sebastopol, the nearest school. Garcia did, however, join a band at his school known as the Chords. After performing in and winning a contest, the band's reward was recording a song. They chose "Raunchy" by Bill Justis.

== Recording career ==
=== Relocation and band beginnings ===
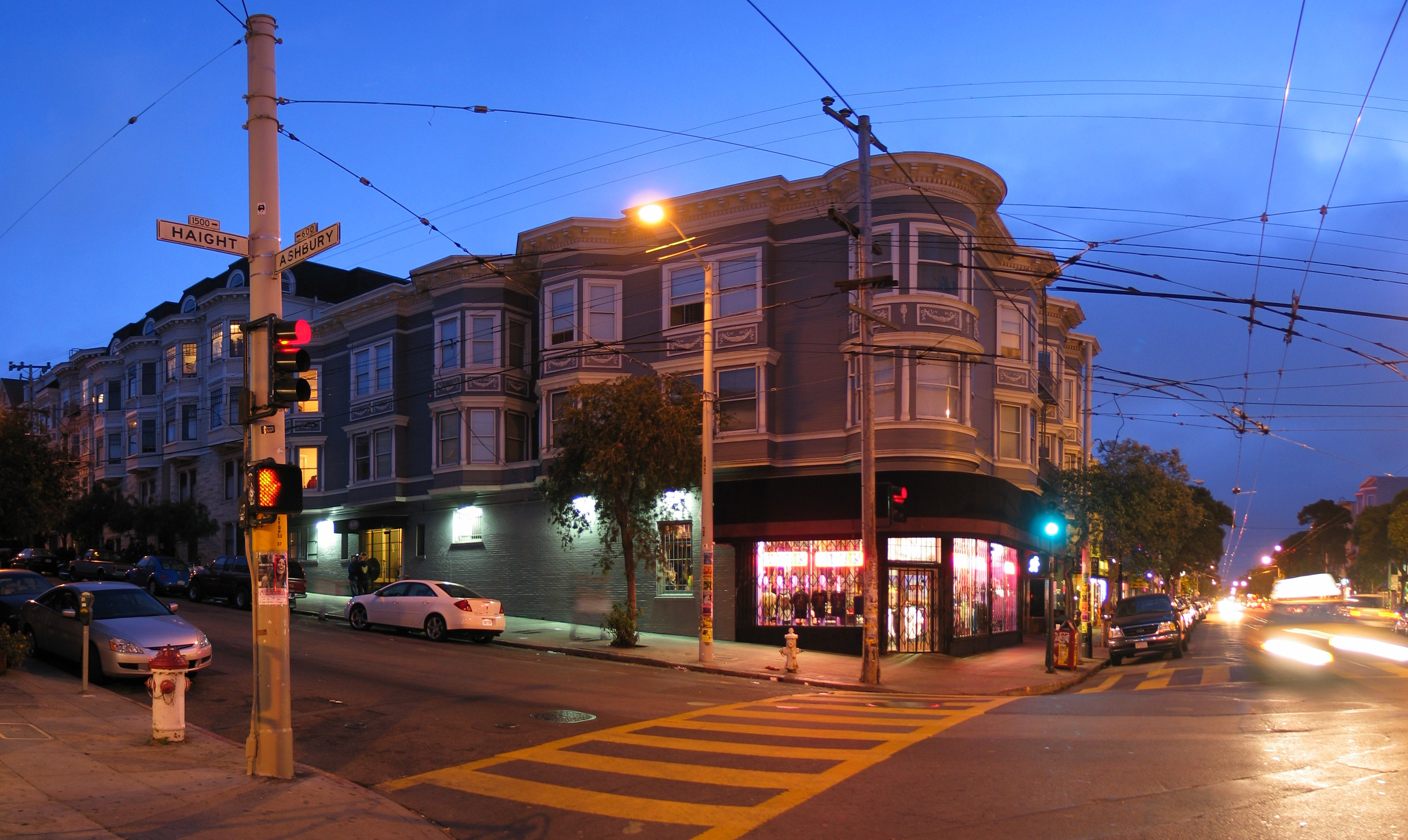
The corner of Haight and Ashbury, center of the San Francisco neighborhood where the Grateful Dead shared a house at 710 Ashbury from fall 1966 to spring 1968.

Garcia stole his mother's car in 1960 and was given the option of joining the U.S. Army in lieu of prison. He received basic training at Fort Ord. After training, he was transferred to Fort Winfield Scott in the Presidio of San Francisco. Garcia spent most of his time in the army at his leisure, missing roll call and accruing many counts of being AWOL. As a result, Garcia was given a general discharge on December 14, 1960.

In January 1961, Garcia drove to East Palo Alto to see Laird Grant, an old friend from middle school. He had purchased a 1950 Cadillac sedan from a cook in the army, which barely made it to Grant's residence before it broke down. Garcia spent the next few weeks sleeping where friends would allow, eventually using his car as a home. Through Grant, Garcia met Dave McQueen in February, who, after hearing Garcia perform some blues music, introduced him to local people and to the Chateau, a rooming house located near Stanford University which was then a popular hangout.

On February 20, 1961, Garcia got into a car with Lee Adams, the house manager of the Chateau and driver; Paul Speegle, a sixteen-year-old artist and acquaintance of Garcia; and Alan Trist, a companion of theirs. After speeding past the Palo Alto Veterans Hospital, the driver encountered a curve and, speeding around 90 miles per hour (140 km/h), crashed into the guard rail, sending the car rolling turbulently. Garcia was hurled through the windshield of the car into a nearby field with such force that he came out of his shoes and had no memory of the ejection. Lee Adams, the driver, and Alan Trist, who was seated in the back, were thrown from the car as well, resulting in abdominal injuries and a spine fracture, respectively. Garcia escaped with a broken collarbone, while Speegle, still in the car, was fatally injured.

Lee's reckless driving and subsequent crash served as an awakening for Garcia, who later said, "That's where my life began. Before then I was always living at less than capacity. I was idling. That was the slingshot for the rest of my life. It was like a second chance. Then I got serious." As a result, Garcia began playing the guitar in earnest—a move which meant giving up his love of drawing and painting.

In April 1961, Garcia first met Robert Hunter, who would become a long-time friend of and lyricist for the Grateful Dead, collaborating principally with Garcia. The two involved themselves in the South Bay and San Francisco art and music scenes, sometimes playing at Menlo Park's Kepler's Books. Garcia performed his first concert with Hunter, each earning five dollars. Garcia and Hunter also played in bands (the Wildwood Boys and the Hart Valley Drifters) with David Nelson, who would later play with Garcia in the New Riders of the Purple Sage and contribute to several Grateful Dead album songs.

In 1962, Garcia met Phil Lesh, the eventual bassist of the Grateful Dead, during a party in Menlo Park's bohemian Perry Lane neighborhood (where author Ken Kesey lived). Lesh would later write in his autobiography that Garcia reminded him of pictures he had seen of the composer Claude Debussy, with his "dark, curly hair, goatee, Impressionist eyes". While attending another party in Palo Alto, Lesh approached Garcia to suggest they record Garcia on Lesh's tape recorder and produce a radio show for the progressive, community-supported Berkeley radio station KPFA. Using an old Wollensak tape recorder, they recorded "Matty Groves" and "The Long Black Veil", among several other tunes. The recordings became a central feature of a 90-minute KPFA special broadcast, "The Long Black Veil and Other Ballads: An Evening with Jerry Garcia". The link between KPFA and the Grateful Dead continues to this day, having included many fundraisers, interviews, live concert broadcasts, taped band performances and all-day or all-weekend "Dead-only" marathons.

Garcia soon began playing and teaching acoustic guitar, as well as banjo. One of Garcia's students was Bob Matthews, who later engineered many of the Grateful Dead's albums. Matthews attended Menlo-Atherton High School and was friends with Bob Weir, and on New Year's Eve 1963, he introduced Weir and Garcia.

Between 1962 and 1964, Garcia sang and performed mainly bluegrass, old-time, and folk music. One of the bands Garcia performed with was the Sleepy Hollow Hog Stompers, a bluegrass act. The group consisted of Garcia on lead guitar, banjo, vocals, and harmonica, Marshall Leicester on banjo, rhythm guitar, and vocals, and Dick Arnold on fiddle and vocals. Soon after this, Garcia, Weir, Ron "Pigpen" McKernan, and several of their friends formed a jug band called Mother McCree's Uptown Jug Champions. Around this time, the psychedelic drug LSD was gaining popularity. Garcia first began using LSD in 1964; later, when asked how it changed his life, he remarked: "Well, it changed everything [...] the effect was that it freed me because I suddenly realized that my little attempt at having a straight life and doing that was really a fiction and just wasn't going to work out. Luckily I wasn't far enough into it for it to be shattering or anything; it was like a realization that just made me feel immensely relieved."

In 1965, Mother McCree's Uptown Jug Champions evolved into the Warlocks, with the addition of Dana Morgan, Jr. (soon replaced by Phil Lesh) on bass guitar and Bill Kreutzmann on percussion. However, the band discovered a record by another group (possibly the future Velvet Underground called The Warlocks. In response, Garcia came up with "Grateful Dead" by opening a Funk & Wagnalls dictionary to an entry for "Grateful dead". The definition for "Grateful dead" was "a dead person, or his angel, showing gratitude to someone who, as an act of charity, arranged their burial". The band's first reaction was disapproval. Garcia later explained the group's reaction: "I didn't like it really, I just found it to be really powerful. [Bob] Weir didn't like it, [Bill] Kreutzmann didn't like it and nobody really wanted to hear about it." Despite their dislike of the name, it quickly spread by word of mouth, and soon became their official title.

=== Career with the Grateful Dead ===
Garcia served as lead guitarist and one of the principal vocalists and songwriters of the Grateful Dead for the band's entire career. Garcia composed songs such as "Uncle John's Band", "Dark Star", "Franklin's Tower", and "Scarlet Begonias", among many others. Robert Hunter, an ardent collaborator with the band, wrote the lyrics to all but a few of Garcia's songs.

Garcia was known for his "soulful extended guitar improvisations", which would frequently feature interplay between him and his fellow band members. His fame, as well as the band's, arguably rested on their ability to never play a song the same way twice. Often, Garcia would take cues from rhythm guitarist Bob Weir, remarking that "there are some [...] kinds of ideas that would really throw me if I had to create a harmonic bridge between all the things going on rhythmically with two drums and Phil [Lesh's] innovative bass playing. Weir's ability to solve that sort of problem is extraordinary. [...] Harmonically, I take a lot of my solo cues from Bob."

When asked to describe his approach to soloing, Garcia commented: "It keeps on changing. I still basically revolve around the melody and the way it's broken up into phrases as I perceive them. With most solos, I tend to play something that phrases the way the melody does; my phrases may be more dense or have different value, but they'll occur in the same places in the song. [...]"

Garcia and the band toured almost constantly from their formation in 1965 until Garcia's death in 1995. Periodically, there were breaks due to exhaustion or health problems, often due to Garcia's drug use. During their three-decade span, the Grateful Dead played 2,314 shows.

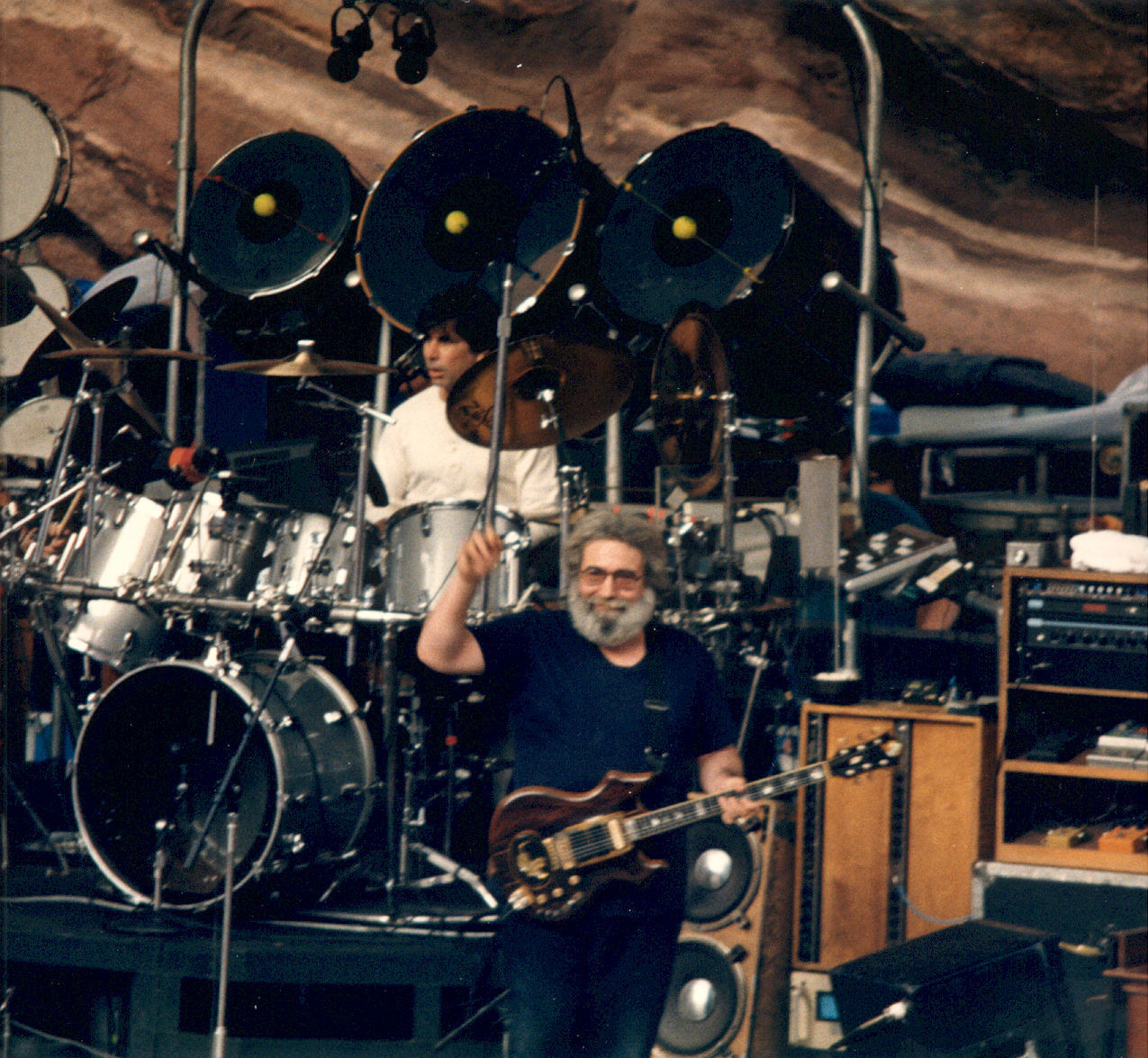
Garcia and drummer Hart in 1987 at Red Rocks Amphitheatre. His guitar "Tiger" and a McIntosh MC2300 can clearly be seen

Garcia's guitar-playing was eclectic. He melded elements from the various kinds of music that influenced him. Echoes of bluegrass playing (such as Arthur Smith and Doc Watson) could be heard. There was also early rock (like Lonnie Mack, James Burton, and Chuck Berry), contemporary blues (Freddie King and Lowell Fulson), country and western (Roy Nichols and Don Rich), and jazz (Charlie Christian and Django Reinhardt) to be heard in Garcia's style. Don Rich was the sparkling country guitar player in Buck Owens's "the Buckaroos" band of the 1960s, but besides Rich's style, both Garcia's pedal steel guitar playing (on Grateful Dead records and others) and his standard electric guitar work, were influenced by another of Owens's Buckaroos of that time, pedal steel player Tom Brumley. And as an improvisational soloist, John Coltrane was one of his greatest personal and musical influences.

Garcia later described his playing style as having "descended from barroom rock and roll, country guitar. Just 'cause that's where all my stuff comes from. It's like that blues instrumental stuff that was happening in the late Fifties and early Sixties, like Freddie King." Garcia's style could vary with the song being played and the instrument he was using, but his playing had a number of so-called "signatures". Among these were lead lines based on rhythmic triplets (examples include the songs "Good Morning Little School Girl", "New Speedway Boogie", "Brokedown Palace", "Deal", "Loser", "Truckin'", "That's It for the Other One", "U.S. Blues", "Sugaree", and "Don't Ease Me In").

=== Side projects ===
In addition to the Grateful Dead, Garcia participated in numerous musical side projects, including the Jerry Garcia Band. He was also involved with various acoustic projects such as Old & In the Way and other bluegrass bands, including collaborations with noted bluegrass mandolinist David Grisman. The documentary film Grateful Dawg, co-produced by Gillian Grisman and former NBC producer Pamela Hamilton chronicles the deep, long-term friendship between Garcia and Grisman. When Garcia and Grisman released Not For Kids Only, Hamilton produced their interview and concert for NBC. After several years of producing stories on the Grateful Dead and band members' side projects, Hamilton interviewed Bob Weir for a feature on Garcia's death marking the end of an era.

Other groups in which Garcia participated at one time or another include Jerry & Sara (with his first wife), the Zodiacs (on bass), the Black Mountain Boys, Legion of Mary, Reconstruction, and the Jerry Garcia Acoustic Band. Garcia was also a fan of jazz artists and improvisation: he played with jazz keyboardists Merl Saunders and Howard Wales for many years in various groups and jam sessions, and he appeared on saxophonist Ornette Coleman's 1988 album, Virgin Beauty. His collaboration with Merl Saunders and Muruga Booker on the world music album Blues From the Rainforest launched the Rainforest Band.

Garcia spent a lot of time in the recording studio helping out fellow musician friends in session work, often adding guitar, vocals, pedal steel, sometimes banjo and piano and even producing. He played on over 50 studio albums, the styles of which were eclectic and varied, including bluegrass, rock, folk, blues, country, jazz, electronic music, gospel, funk, and reggae. Artists who sought Garcia's contribution included the likes of Jefferson Airplane (most notably Surrealistic Pillow, Garcia being listed as their "spiritual advisor"). Garcia himself recalled in a mid-1967 interview that he'd played the high lead on "Today", played on "Plastic Fantastic Lover" and "Comin' Back to Me" on that album. Others include Tom Fogerty, David Bromberg, Robert Hunter (Liberty, on Relix Records), Paul Pena, Peter Rowan, Warren Zevon, Country Joe McDonald, Pete Sears, Ken Nordine, Ornette Coleman, Bruce Hornsby, Bob Dylan, It's a Beautiful Day, and many more. In 1995 Garcia played on three tracks for the CD Blue Incantation by guitarist Sanjay Mishra, making it his last studio collaboration.

Throughout the early 1970s, Garcia, Lesh, Grateful Dead drummer Mickey Hart, and David Crosby collaborated intermittently with MIT-educated composer and biologist Ned Lagin on several projects in the realm of early ambient music; these include the album Seastones (released by Ned Lagin on the Round Records subsidiary) and L, an unfinished dance work composed by Ned Lagin. In 1970, Garcia participated in the soundtrack for the film Zabriskie Point.

Garcia also played pedal steel guitar for fellow-San Francisco musicians New Riders of the Purple Sage from their initial dates in 1969 to October 1971, when increased commitments with the Dead forced him to opt out of the group. He appears as a band member on their debut album New Riders of the Purple Sage, and produced Home, Home on the Road, a 1974 live album by the band. He also contributed pedal steel guitar to the enduring hit "Teach Your Children" by Crosby, Stills, Nash, & Young, and to the song "Southbound Train" by Crosby & Nash. Garcia also played steel guitar licks on Brewer & Shipley's 1970 album Tarkio. Despite considering himself a novice on the pedal steel, Garcia routinely ranked high in player polls. After a long lapse from playing the pedal steel, he played it once more during several of the Dead's concerts with Bob Dylan in the summer of 1987.

In 1988, Garcia agreed to perform at several major benefits including the "Soviet American Peace Walk" concert at the Band Shell, in Golden Gate Park, San Francisco, that drew 25,000 people. He was asked to play by longtime friend and fellow musician, Pete Sears, who played piano with all the bands that day, and also procured all the other musicians. Garcia, Mickey Hart and Steve Parish played the show, then were given a police escort to a Grateful Dead show across the bay later that night. Garcia also played with Nick Gravenites and Pete Sears at a benefit given for Vietnam Veteran and peace activist Brian Willson, who lost both legs below the knee when he attempted to block a train carrying weapons to military dictatorships in El Salvador.

Having previously studied at the San Francisco Art Institute as a teenager, Garcia embarked on a second career in the visual arts in the late 1980s. He created a number of drawings, etchings, and water colors. Garcia's artistic endeavors were represented by the Weir Gallery in Berkeley, California from 1989 to 1996. During this period, Roberta Weir (unrelated to Garcia's bandmate Bob Weir) provided Garcia with new art techniques to use, sponsored his first solo show in 1990, and prepared blank etching plates for him to draw on. These would then be processed and printed by gallery staff and brought back to Garcia for approval and signature, usually with a passing of stacks of paper backstage at a Dead show. His annual shows at the Weir Gallery garnered much attention, leading to further shows in New York and other cities. Garcia was an early adopter of digital art media; his artistic style was as varied as his musical output, and he carried small notebooks for pen and ink sketches wherever he toured. Roberta Weir continues to maintain an archive of the artwork of Jerry Garcia. Perhaps the most widely seen pieces of Jerry Garcia's art are the many editions of men's neckties produced by Stonehenge Ltd. and Mulberry Neckware. Some began as etchings, other designs came from his drawings, paintings, and digital art. Garcia's artwork has since expanded into everything from hotel rooms, wet suits, men's sport shirts, a women's wear line, boxer shorts, hair accessories, cummerbunds, silk scarves and wool rugs.

== Personal life ==
Garcia met the woman who became his first wife, Sara Ruppenthal, in 1963. She was working at the coffee house in the back of Kepler's Books, where Garcia, Hunter, and Nelson regularly performed. They married on April 23, 1963, and on December 8 of that year, their daughter Heather was born. They divorced in 1967.

Carolyn Adams, a Merry Prankster also known as "Mountain Girl" or "M.G.," had a daughter, Sunshine, with Ken Kesey in 1966. Adams married another Prankster, George Walker, but they soon separated. She and Sunshine then moved into 710 Ashbury with Garcia in late 1966 where they would ultimately live together until 1975. Adams gave birth to Garcia's second and third daughters, Annabelle Walker Garcia (b. February 2, 1970) and Theresa Adams "Trixie" Garcia (b. September 21, 1974).

In August 1970, Garcia's mother Ruth was involved in a car crash near Twin Peaks in San Francisco. Garcia, who was recording the album American Beauty at the time, often left the sessions to visit his mother with his brother Clifford. She died on September 28, 1970.

In the midst of a March 1973 Grateful Dead engagement at Long Island's Nassau Coliseum, Garcia met Deborah Koons, an aspiring filmmaker from a wealthy Cincinnati, Ohio-based family who would much later marry him and become his widow. After a brief correspondence, he began his relationship with her in mid-1974. This gradually strained his relationship with Adams and culminated in Garcia leaving Adams for Koons in late 1975. The end of his relationship with Koons in 1977 precipitated a brief reconciliation with Adams, including the reestablishment of their household. However, she did not agree with the guitarist's persistent use of narcotics and moved with the children to the Eugene, Oregon, area, living near Kesey, in 1978.

Following Adams' departure, Garcia had an affair with Amy Moore. She was a Kentucky-born member of the extended "Grateful Dead family", and the mistress of Texas oil heir Roy Cullen. Their affair lasted circa 1980–1981, and inspired the Garcia-Hunter song "Run for the Roses".

Adams and Garcia were married on December 31, 1981, largely as a result of mutual tax exigencies. Despite the legal codification of their union, she remained in Oregon, while Garcia continued to live near the Grateful Dead's offices in San Rafael, California. Garcia lived with a variety of housemates, including longtime Grateful Dead employee and Jerry Garcia Band manager Rock Scully. Scully, who co-managed the Grateful Dead throughout the mid-to-late 1960s before serving as the band's "advance man" and publicist, was dismissed by the group in 1984 for enabling Garcia's addictions and for allegedly embezzling the Garcia Band's profits. Another housemate was Nora Sage, a Deadhead who became Garcia's housekeeper while studying at the Golden Gate University School of Law. The exact nature of their relationship remains unclear, although it is believed to have been platonic due to Garcia's addictions. She later became his art representative.

While they would briefly reunite following his diabetic coma, Garcia and Adams ultimately divorced in 1994. Phil Lesh has subsequently stated that he rarely saw Adams on any of the band tours. In a 1991 Rolling Stone interview, Garcia stated that "we haven't really lived together since the Seventies".

During the autumn of 1978, Garcia developed a friendship with Shimer College student Manasha Matheson, an artist and music enthusiast. They remained friends over the following nine years before initiating a romantic relationship in Hartford, Connecticut, on the Grateful Dead's spring 1987 tour. Jerry and Manasha became parents with the birth of their daughter, Keelin Noel Garcia, on December 20, 1987. On August 17, 1990, Garcia and Matheson married at their San Anselmo, California, home in a spiritual ceremony free of legal convention. In 1991, Garcia expressed his delight in finding the time to "actually be a father" to Keelin in contrast to his past relationships with his children. A year later, Garcia dedicated his first art book, Paintings, Drawings and Sketches, "For Manasha, with love, Jerry."

In January 1993, Barbara "Brigid" Meier, a former girlfriend from the early 1960s, reentered Garcia's life for a brief period. Meier claimed that Garcia had considered her to be the "love of his life" and proposed to her during a Hawaiian vacation shortly after their relationship recommenced. Garcia's "love of his life" sentiment was not reserved for one lover, as he expressed the same feelings to several other women in his life. At Garcia's 1995 funeral, Koons declared that she was "the love of his life" while paying her final respects, whereupon Meier and Ruppenthal, who were both in attendance, simultaneously exclaimed, "He said that to me!"

The affair with Meier marked the breakup of Garcia's family life with Matheson and Keelin. Garcia ended the affair with Meier forty-five days later while on tour in Chicago with the Grateful Dead after she confronted him about his drug use.

Shortly thereafter, Garcia renewed his acquaintance with Deborah Koons in the spring of 1993. They married on February 14, 1994, in Sausalito, California. Garcia and Koons were married at the time of his death.

=== Lifestyle and health ===
Because of their public profile, Garcia and his collaborators were occasionally singled out in the American government's war on drugs. On October 2, 1967, 710 Ashbury Street in San Francisco (where the Grateful Dead had taken up residence the year before) was raided after a police tip-off. Grateful Dead members Phil Lesh, Bob Weir, and Ron "Pigpen" McKernan were apprehended on marijuana charges which were later dropped, although Garcia was not arrested. The following year, Garcia's picture was used in a campaign commercial for Richard Nixon.

Most of the band was arrested again in January 1970, after they flew to New Orleans from Hawaii. After returning to their hotel from a performance, the band checked into their rooms, only to be quickly raided by police. Approximately fifteen people were arrested on the spot, including many of the road crew, management, and nearly all of the Grateful Dead except for Garcia, who arrived later, outgoing keyboardist Tom Constanten, who abstained from all drugs as a member of the Church of Scientology, and McKernan, who eschewed illegal drugs in favor of alcohol.

According to Bill Kreutzmann, the band's use of cocaine accelerated throughout the early 1970s. After using heroin in a brothel in 1974 (likely on the band's second European tour), Garcia was introduced to a smokeable form of the drug (initially advertised as refined opium) colloquially known as "Persian" or "Persian Base" during the group's 1975 hiatus. Influenced by the stresses of creating and releasing The Grateful Dead Movie and the acrimonious collapse of the band's independent record labels over the next two years, Garcia became increasingly dependent upon both substances. These factors, combined with the alcohol and drug abuse of several other members of the Grateful Dead, resulted in a turbulent atmosphere. By 1978, the band's chemistry began "cracking and crumbling", resulting in poor group cohesion. As a result, Keith and Donna Jean Godchaux left the band in February 1979.

With the addition of keyboardist/vocalist Brent Mydland that year amid the ongoing coalescence of the Deadhead subculture, the band reached new commercial heights as a touring group on the American arena circuit in the early 1980s, enabling them to forsake studio recording for several years. Nevertheless, this was offset by such factors as the band's atypically large payroll and Garcia's $700-a-day (equivalent to $2,300 in 2025) drug addiction, resulting in the guitarist taking on a frenetic slate of solo touring outside of the Grateful Dead's rigorous schedule, including abbreviated acoustic duo concerts with Jerry Garcia Band bassist John Kahn that were widely rumored to be a funding conduit for their respective addictions.

Though things seemed to be getting better for the band, Garcia's health was declining. By 1983, Garcia's demeanor onstage had appeared to change. Despite still playing the guitar with great passion and intensity, there were times that he would appear disengaged; as such, shows were often inconsistent. Years of heavy tobacco smoking had affected his voice, and he gained considerable weight. By 1984, he would often rest his chin on the microphone during performances. The so-called "endless tour"—the result of years of financial risks, drug use, and poor business decisions—had taken its toll.

Garcia's decade-long heroin addiction culminated in the rest of the band holding an intervention in January 1985. Given the choice between the band or the drugs, Garcia agreed to check into a rehabilitation center in Oakland, California. A few days later, on January 19, before the start of his program in Oakland, Garcia was arrested for drug possession in Golden Gate Park; he subsequently attended a drug diversion program. Throughout 1985, he tapered his drug use on tour and at home with the assistance of Nora Sage; by the spring of 1986, he was completely abstinent.

Precipitated by an unhealthy weight, dehydration, bad eating habits, and a recent relapse on the Grateful Dead's first stadium tour, Garcia collapsed into a diabetic coma on July 10, 1986, waking up five days later. He later spoke about this period of unconsciousness as surreal: "Well, I had some very weird experiences. My main experience was one of furious activity and tremendous struggle in a sort of futuristic, space-ship vehicle with insectoid presences. After I came out of my coma, I had this image of myself as these little hunks of protoplasm that were stuck together kind of like stamps with perforations between them that you could snap off." Garcia's coma had a profound effect on him: it forced him to have to relearn how to play the guitar, as well as other, more basic skills. Within a handful of months, he had recovered, playing with the Jerry Garcia Band and the Grateful Dead again later that year.

After Garcia's recovery, the band released a comeback album In the Dark in 1987, which became their best-selling studio album. Inspired by Garcia's improved health, a successful album and the continuing emergence of Mydland as a third frontman, the band's energy and chemistry reached a new peak in the late 1980s.

Amid a litany of personal problems, Mydland died of a speedball overdose in July 1990. His death greatly affected Garcia, leading him to believe that the band's chemistry would never be the same. Before beginning the fall tour, the band acquired keyboardists Vince Welnick and Bruce Hornsby. As the band continued through 1991, Garcia became concerned with the band's future. He was exhausted from five straight years of touring. He thought a break was necessary, mainly so that the band could come back with fresh material. The idea was put off by the pressures of management, and the touring continued. Garcia began using heroin again after several years of intermittent prescription opiate use. Though his relapse was brief, the band was quick to react. Soon after the last show of the tour in Denver, Garcia was confronted by the band with another intervention. After a disastrous meeting, Garcia invited Phil Lesh over to his home in San Rafael, California, where he explained that after the meeting he would start attending a methadone clinic. Garcia said that he wanted to clean up in his own way and return to making music.

After returning from the band's 1992 summer tour, Garcia became sick, a throwback to his diabetic coma in 1986. Manasha Garcia nursed Garcia back to health and organized a team of health professionals which included acupuncturist Yen Wei Choong and Randy Baker, MD, a holistic family physician to treat him at home. Garcia recovered over the following days, despite the Grateful Dead having to cancel their fall tour to allow him time to recuperate. Garcia reduced his cigarette smoking and began losing weight. He also became a vegetarian.

Despite these improvements, Garcia's physical and mental condition continued to decline throughout 1993 and 1994. He began to use narcotics again to dull the pain. In light of his second drug relapse and current condition, Garcia checked himself into the Betty Ford Center during July 1995. His stay was limited, lasting only two weeks. Motivated by the experience, he then checked into the Serenity Knolls treatment center in Forest Knolls, California, where he died.

== Death ==
Garcia died in his room at the rehabilitation clinic on August 9, 1995. The cause of death was a heart attack, likely due to diabetes and his poor diet. Garcia had long struggled with diabetes, weight problems, sleep apnea, heavy smoking, and drug addiction—all of which contributed to his physical decline. Lesh remarked that, upon hearing of Garcia's death, "I was struck numb. I had lost my oldest surviving friend, my brother." Garcia's funeral was held on August 12, at St. Stephen's Episcopal Church in Belvedere. It was attended by his family, the remaining Grateful Dead members, and their friends, including Bill Walton and Bob Dylan. Deborah Koons barred two of Garcia's former wives from the ceremony.

On August 13, about 25,000 people attended a municipally sanctioned public memorial at the Polo Fields of San Francisco's Golden Gate Park. Crowds produced hundreds of flowers, gifts, images, and a bagpipe rendition of "Amazing Grace" in remembrance. In the Haight, a single white rose was reportedly tied to a tree near the Dead's former Haight-Ashbury house, where a group of followers gathered to mourn.

On the morning of April 4, 1996, after a total lunar eclipse earlier that day, Weir and Deborah Koons, accompanied by Sanjay Mishra, spread half of Garcia's ashes into the Ganges at the holy city of Rishikesh, India, a site sacred to Hindus. The remaining ashes were poured into the San Francisco Bay. Koons did not allow former wife Carolyn Garcia to attend the spreading of the ashes.

== Musical equipment ==
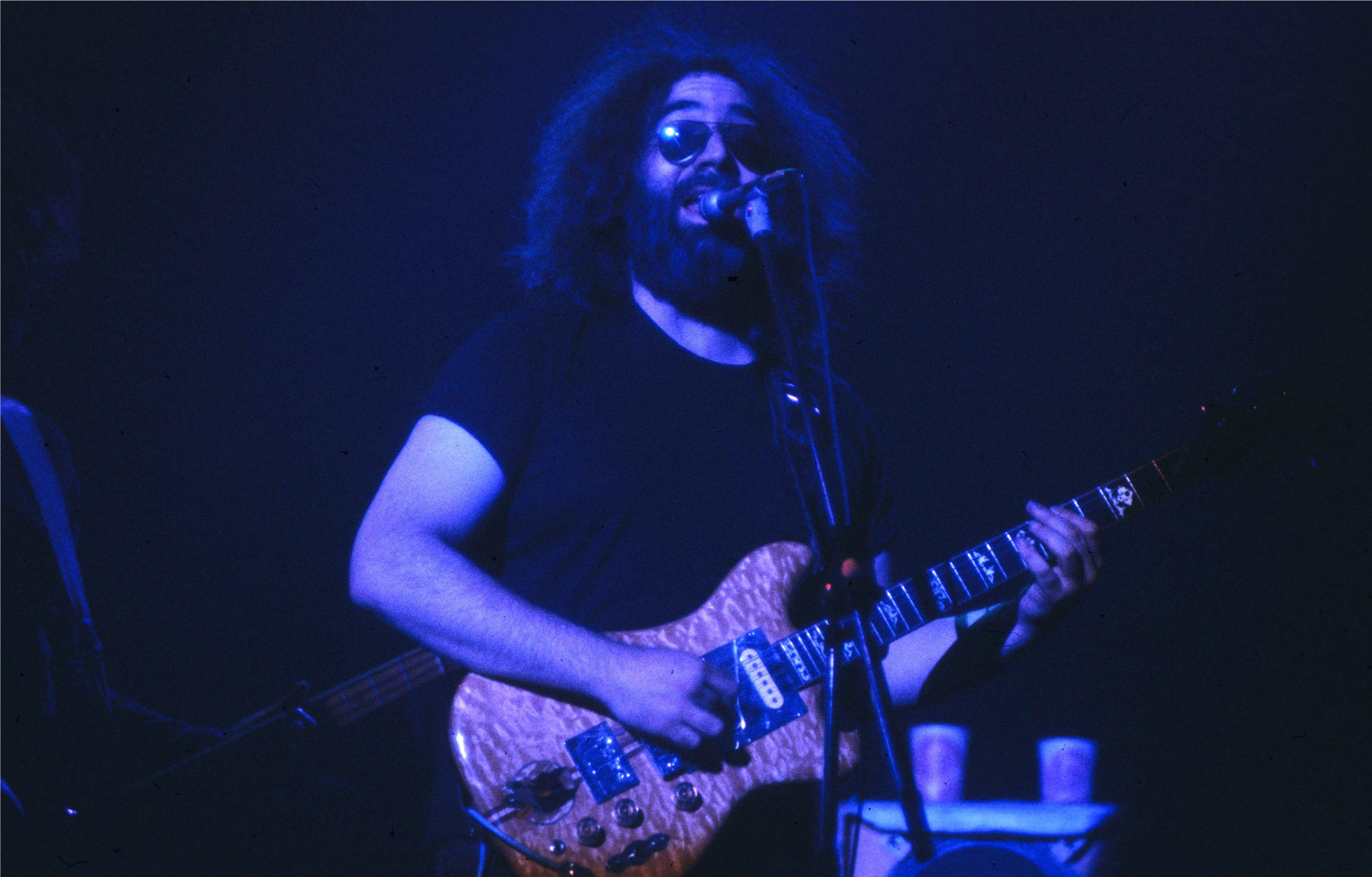
Garcia in 1978 at the Veterans Memorial Coliseum with guitar "Wolf"

Garcia played many guitars during his career, which ranged from student and budget models to custom-made instruments. During his thirty-five-year career as a professional musician, Garcia used about 25 guitars.

In 1965, when Garcia was playing with the Warlocks, he used a Guild Starfire, which he also used on the début album of the Grateful Dead. Beginning in late 1967 and ending in 1968, Garcia played black or gold mid-1950s Gibson Les Paul guitars with P-90 pickups. In 1969, he picked up the Gibson SG and used it for most of that year and 1970, except for a small period in between where he used a sunburst Fender Stratocaster.

During Garcia's "pedal steel flirtation period" (as Bob Weir referred to it in Anthem to Beauty), from approximately 1969 to 1972, he initially played a Fender instrument before upgrading to the ZB Custom D-10, especially in his earlier public performances. Although this was a double neck guitar, Garcia used the "E9 neck and the three pedals to raise the tone and two levers to lower it." He employed an Emmons D-10 at the Grateful Dead's and New Riders of the Purple Sage's final appearances at the Fillmore East in April 1971.

In 1969, Garcia played pedal steel on three notable outside recordings: the track "The Farm" on the Jefferson Airplane album Volunteers, the track "Oh Mommy" by Brewer and Shipley and the hit single "Teach Your Children" by Crosby, Stills, Nash & Young from their album Déjà Vu, released in 1970. Garcia played on the latter album in exchange for harmony lessons for the Grateful Dead, who were at the time recording Workingman's Dead.

In 1971, Garcia began playing a sunburst Les Paul. In March and April 1971 – the time period during which the Grateful Dead recorded its second live album, Grateful Dead – Garcia played the "Peanut", a guitar he had received from Rick Turner, who had custom built the guitar's body and incorporated the neck, pickups, and hardware from an early '60s Les Paul. In May, Garcia began using a 1955 natural finish Stratocaster that had been given to him by Graham Nash in 1969. Garcia added an alligator sticker to the pickguard in the fall of 1971, and the thusly-named "Alligator" would remain Garcia's principal electric guitar until August 1973. In the summer of 1971, Garcia also played a double-cutaway Les Paul TV Junior. While Alligator was in the shop in the summer of 1972, he briefly reverted to the sunburst Stratocaster; this can be seen in Sunshine Daydream.

In late 1972, Garcia purchased the first guitar ("Eagle") made by Alembic luthier Doug Irwin for $850 (equivalent to $6,500 in 2025). Enamored of Irwin's talents, he immediately commissioned his own custom instrument. This guitar, nicknamed "Wolf" for a sticker Garcia added below the tailpiece, was delivered in May 1973 and replaced Alligator on stage in September. It cost $1,500 (equivalent to $10,900 in 2025), an extremely high price for the era.

Wolf was made with an ebony fingerboard and featured numerous embellishments like alternating grain designs in the headstock, ivory inlays, and fret marker dots made of sterling silver. The body was composed of western maple wood which had a core of purpleheart. Garcia later had Irwin (who ultimately left Alembic to start his own business) replace the electronics inside the guitar, at which point he added his own logo to the headstock alongside the Alembic logo. The system included two interchangeable plates for configuring pickups: one was made for strictly single coils, while the other accommodated humbuckers. Shortly after receiving the modified instrument, Garcia commissioned another custom guitar from Irwin with one caveat: "Don't hold back."

During the Grateful Dead's 1974 European tour, Wolf was dropped on several occasions, one of which caused a minor crack in the headstock. Following filming of The Grateful Dead Movie (in which the guitar is prominently visible) a month later, Garcia returned it to Irwin for repairs. Throughout its absence, Garcia predominantly played several Travis Bean guitars, including the TB1000A (1975) and the TB500 (1976-1977). On September 28, 1977, Irwin delivered the refurbished Wolf back to Garcia. The wolf sticker which gave the guitar its name had now been inlaid into the instrument; it also featured an effects loop between the pick-ups and controls (so inline effects would "see" the same signal at all times) which was bypassable. Irwin also put a new face on the headstock with only his logo (he later claimed to have built the guitar himself, though pictures through time clearly show the progression of logos, from Alembic, to Alembic & Irwin, to only Irwin).

The Grateful Dead began using McIntosh Labs amplifiers in the mid-1960s at the insistence and funding of sound technician and prolific LSD chemist Owsley Stanley. Garcia began using a specific McIntosh MC 2300 in 1973, eventually christened with a Budweiser Budman sticker placed on the front in 1974 and making it a unique way of identifying Garcia's specific MC 2300 out of the many that powered the Wall of Sound. "Budman" was one of the only components from the Wall to continue traveling with Garcia until 1993 when it was replaced with a cab simulation system.

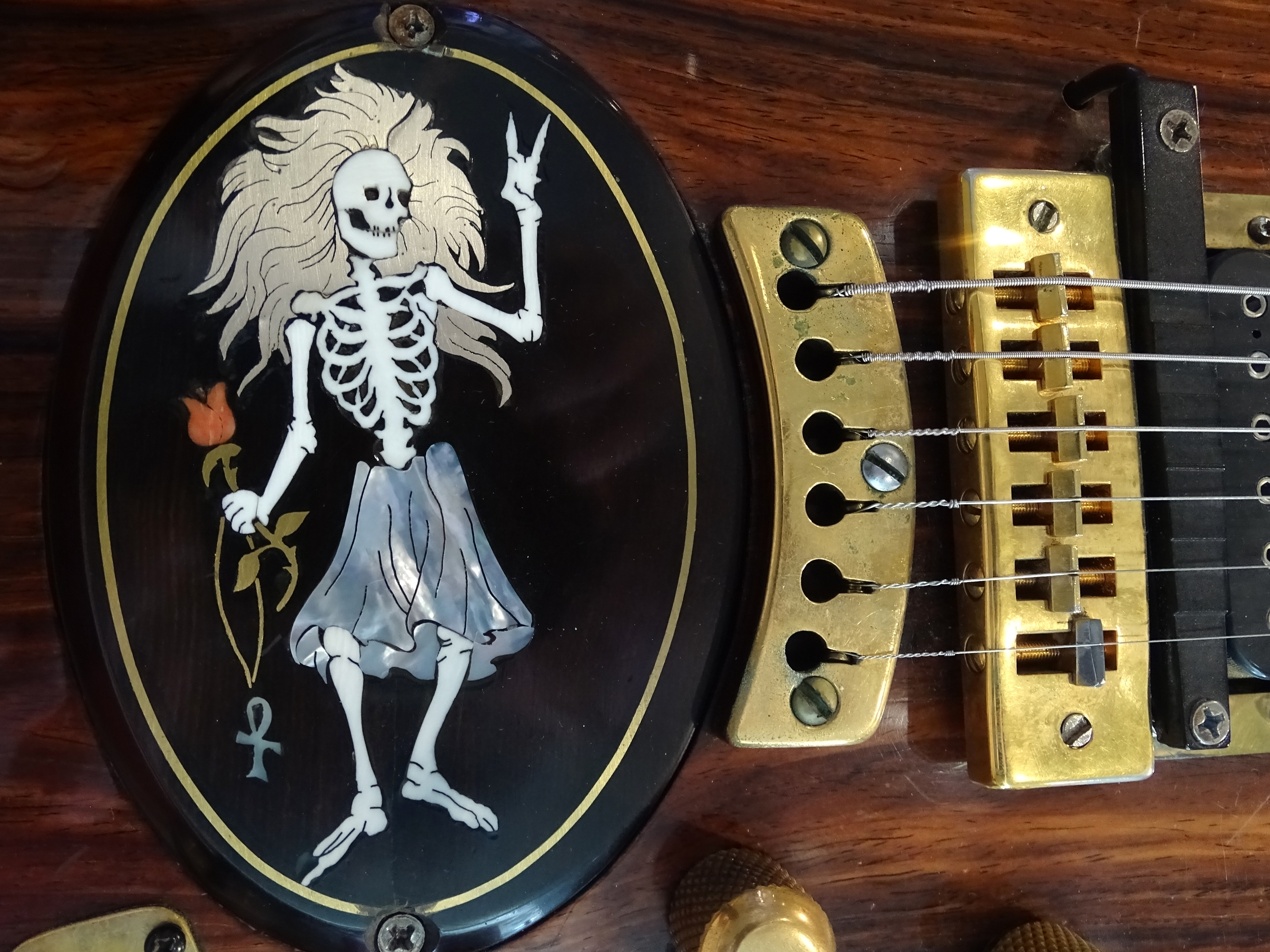
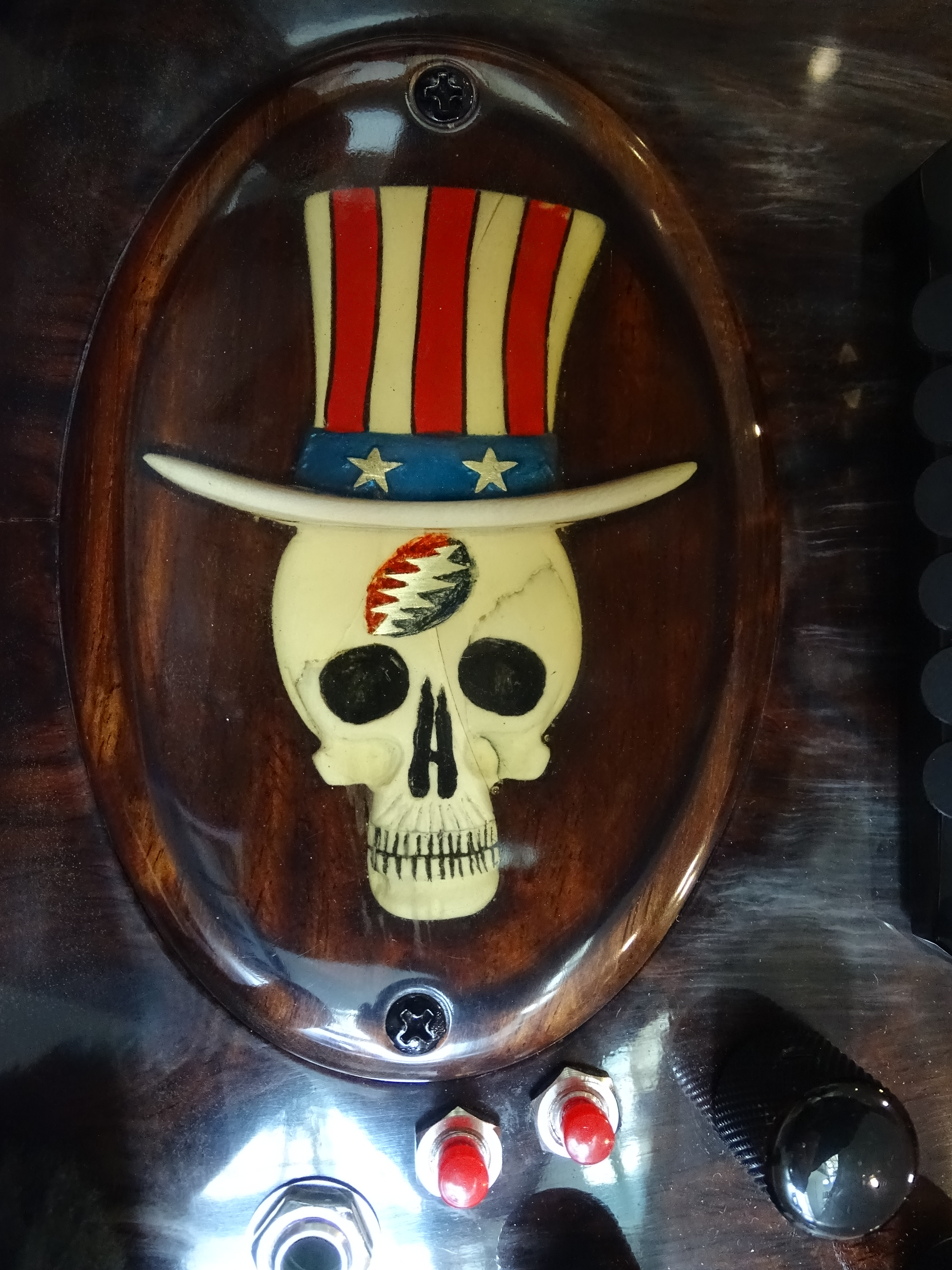
The inlays of Rosebud (above) and Top Hat (below)

The Budman amp is the longest continuously used piece of gear in Grateful Dead history. On 14 October 2021 during a Sotheby's auction titled "From the Vault: Property from the Grateful Dead and Friends". Garcia's last stage rack containing a MC2300 sold for $226,800 USD. The MC2300 Budman sold for $378,000 USD.

Nearly seven years after he commissioned it, Garcia received his second custom guitar ("Tiger") from Irwin in the summer of 1979. He first employed the instrument in concert at a Grateful Dead performance at the Oakland Auditorium Arena on August 4, 1979. Its name was derived from the inlay on the preamp cover. The body of Tiger was of rich quality: the top layer was cocobolo, with the preceding layers being maple stripe, vermilion, and flame maple, in that order. The neck was made of western maple with an ebony fingerboard. The pickups consisted of a single coil DiMarzio SDS-1 and two humbucker DiMarzio Super IIs; these were easily removable, accommodating Garcia's preference for replacing his pickups every year or two. The electronics were composed of an effects bypass loop (which allowed Garcia to control the sound of his effects through the tone and volume controls on the guitar) and a preamplifier/buffer, which rested behind a plate in the back of the guitar. Fully outfitted, Tiger weighed 13 1/2 pounds (6.1 kg). This was Garcia's principal guitar for the next eleven years, and his most played. Due to the ongoing repair and retrofitting of other instruments, Garcia played Tiger during the last song ("Box of Rain") of his final performance with the Grateful Dead at Chicago's Soldier Field on July 9, 1995.

In the late 1980s Garcia, Weir and CSN (along with many others) endorsed Alvarez Yairi acoustic guitars. There are many photographs circulating (mostly promotional) of Garcia playing a DY99 Virtuoso Custom with a Modulus graphite neck. He opted to play with the less decorated model but the promotional photo from the Alvarez Yairi catalog has him holding the "tree of life" model. This hand-built guitar was notable for the collaboration between Japanese luthier Kazuo Yairi and Modulus Graphite of San Rafael. Since Garcia's death, the DY99 model has remained highly valued among collectors.

In 1990, Irwin completed "Rosebud", Garcia's fourth custom guitar. While similar to Tiger in many respects, it featured different inlays and electronics in addition to a slightly lighter weight. Rosebud, unlike Tiger, was configured with three humbuckers; the neck and bridge pickups shared a tone control, while the middle had its own. Atop the guitar was a Roland GK-2 pickup which fed the controller set inside the guitar. The GK2 was used in conjunction with the Roland GR-50 rack mount synthesizer. In turn, the GR-50 synthesizer drove a Korg M1R synthesizer that produced MIDI effects during live performances of this period, as heard on the Grateful Dead's Without a Net (1990) and other contemporaneous recordings. Sections of the guitar were hollowed out to bring the weight down to 11 1/2 pounds (5.2 kg). The inlay, a dancing skeleton holding a rose, covers a plate just below the bridge. The final cost of the instrument was $11,000 (equivalent to $27,100 in 2025).

In 1993, carpenter and aspiring luthier Stephen Cripe tried his hand at making a speculative instrument for Garcia. After researching Tiger through pictures and films, Cripe set out on what would soon become known as "Lightning Bolt", again named for its inlay. The guitar used Brazilian rosewood for the fingerboard and East Indian rosewood for the body, which, with admitted irony from Cripe, had been taken from a 19th-century bed used by opium smokers. Built purely from guesswork, Lightning Bolt was gifted by Cripe to Garcia, who began using the guitar exclusively. However, as Cripe had little background in electronics, Garcia hired San Francisco-based repairman Gary Brawer to reconfigure the pickups and make the instrument MIDI-compatible. Additionally, Cripe "hadn't known that the oval-shaped body inlays on Tiger and Rosebud concealed their batteries, so Brawer had to remove his inlay and put it on a cover-plate." A new bridge also was installed during the final Grateful Dead tour.

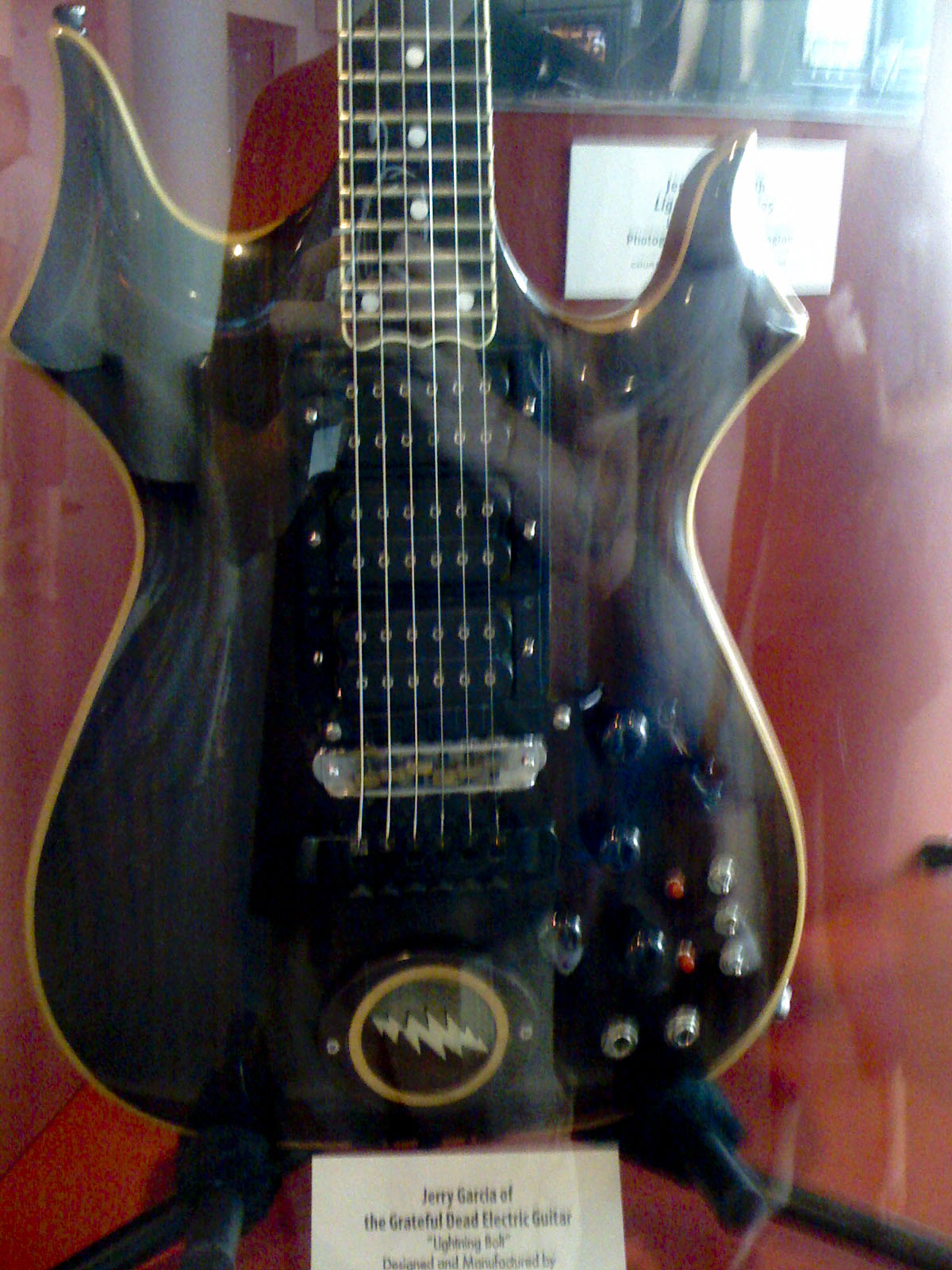
Lightning Bolt

Soon after, Garcia requested that Cripe build a backup of the guitar. Cripe, who had not measured or photographed the original, was told simply to "wing it." Cripe later delivered the backup, which was known by the name "Top Hat", in April 1995. Garcia bought it from him for $6,500, making it the first guitar that Cripe had ever sold. Still infatuated with Lightning Bolt, Garcia rarely used the backup.

After Garcia's death, the ownership of Wolf and Tiger came into question. According to Garcia's will, his guitars were bequeathed to Doug Irwin, who had constructed them. The remaining Grateful Dead members disagreed – they considered his guitars to be property of the band, leading to a lawsuit between the two parties. In 2001, Irwin won the case. However, nearly having been left destitute from a traffic accident in 1998, he decided to place the guitars up for auction in hopes of being able to start another guitar workshop.

On May 8, 2002, Wolf and Tiger, among other memorabilia, were placed for auction at Studio 54 in New York City. Tiger was sold for $957,500, and Wolf for $789,500. Together, the pair sold for $1.74 million, setting a new world record. Wolf went into in the private collection of Daniel Pritzker who kept it in a secure climate controlled room in a private residence at Utica, New York. Tiger went to the private collection of Indianapolis Colts owner Jim Irsay. In May 2017, Wolf was again auctioned, but this time for charity. Pritzker decided to sell the guitar and donate all proceeds to the Montgomery, Alabama based Southern Poverty Law Center. Brian Halligan placed the winning bid totaling $1.9 million.

For the majority of 2019 Wolf and Tiger were included in the Play it Loud exhibit at the Metropolitan Museum of Art in New York City. On June 23, 2019 John Mayer played Wolf with Dead & Company at Citi Field.

In March 2026, Tiger was sold at auction for $9,500,000 ($11,560,000 including auction fees).

== Legacy ==
In 1987, Vermont ice cream maker Ben & Jerry's introduced their Cherry Garcia flavor dedicated to him. It was the first ice cream flavor dedicated to a musician.

Several bands have referenced Garcia and the Sam Peckinpah film, Bring Me the Head of Alfredo Garcia, with compositions entitled, "Bring Me the Head of Jerry Garcia"; Archie Brown and the Young Bucks appear to have been first, on an album with that title in 1987. New York City punk group Iron Prostate released a 7" single with the name on Vital Music Records in 1991. Australian punk group Dick Nasty released one on their album, "Heaven's Filling Up" in 2012. Welsh psych-rockers The Keys released theirs on an album with the same title, in 2019.

Garcia was inducted into the Rock and Roll Hall of Fame as a member of the Grateful Dead in 1994. He declined to attend the ceremony; the band jokingly brought a cardboard cutout of Garcia out on stage in his absence.

Seattle rock band Soundgarden released their instrumental "Jerry Garcia's Finger" in 1995 on their EP Songs From the Superunknown. They released it again in 1996 as the b-side to their single "Pretty Noose".

Shortly after Garcia's death, astronomers Simon Radford and Ed Olszewski named an asteroid that orbits between Mars and Jupiter after him in November 1995. Tom Gehrels, who had originally discovered the asteroid in 1985 but never named it, offered it to them for the occasion.

In 1998, Drs. Craig A. Burnside and Srinivas Kambhampati named their newly discovered species of wood roach Cryptocercus garciai after Garcia.

In 2000, NBC broadcast an animated sitcom, God, the Devil and Bob, in which the character of "God" resembled Garcia. Backlash from religious groups led twenty-two stations to refuse to air the series. It was cancelled after four episodes due to low ratings.

In 2003, Rolling Stone ranked Jerry Garcia 13th in its list of the 100 Greatest Guitarists of All Time.

On July 30, 2004, Melvin Seals was the first Jerry Garcia Band (JGB) member to headline an outdoor music and camping festival called "The Grateful Garcia Gathering". Jerry Garcia Band drummer David Kemper joined Melvin Seals and JGB in 2007. Other musicians and friends of Garcia include Donna Jean Godchaux, Mookie Siegel, Pete Sears, G.E. Smith, Chuck Hammer, Barry Sless, Jackie Greene, Brian Lesh, Sanjay Mishra, and Mark Karan.

On July 21, 2005, the San Francisco Recreation and Park Commission passed a resolution to name the amphitheater in McLaren Park the "Jerry Garcia Amphitheater". The amphitheater is located in the Excelsior District, where Garcia grew up. The first show to happen at the Jerry Garcia Amphitheater was Jerry Day 2005 on August 7, 2005. Jerry's brother, Tiff Garcia, was the first person to welcome everybody to the "Jerry Garcia Amphitheater". Jerry Day is an annual celebration of Garcia in his childhood neighborhood. The dedication ceremony (Jerry Day 2) on October 29, 2005, was officiated by mayor Gavin Newsom.

On September 24, 2005, the Comes a Time: A Celebration of the Music & Spirit of Jerry Garcia tribute concert was held at the Hearst Greek Theatre in Berkeley, California. The concert featured Bob Weir, Bill Kreutzmann, Mickey Hart, Bruce Hornsby, Trey Anastasio, Warren Haynes, Jimmy Herring, Michael Kang, Jay Lane, Jeff Chimenti, Mark Karan, Robin Sylvester, Kenny Brooks, Melvin Seals, Merl Saunders, Marty Holland, Stu Allen, Gloria Jones, and Jackie LaBranch.

According to fellow Bay Area guitar player Henry Kaiser, Garcia is "the most recorded guitarist in history. With more than 2,200 Grateful Dead concerts, and 1,000 Jerry Garcia Band concerts captured on tape – as well as numerous studio sessions – there are about 15,000 hours of his guitar work preserved for the ages."

Georgia-based composer Lee Johnson released an orchestral tribute to the music of the Grateful Dead, recorded with the Russian National Orchestra, entitled "Dead Symphony: Lee Johnson Symphony No. 6". Johnson was interviewed on NPR on the July 26, 2008 broadcast of Weekend Edition, and gave much credit to the genius and craft of Garcia's songwriting. A live performance with the Baltimore Symphony Orchestra, conducted by Johnson himself, was held Friday, August 1.

In 2010, the Santa Barbara Bowl in California opened Jerry Garcia Glen along the walk up to the venue. There is a statue of Garcia's right hand along the way.

Numerous music festivals across the United States and Uxbridge, Middlesex, UK hold annual events in memory of Jerry Garcia.

On May 14, 2015, an all-star lineup held a tribute concert for Garcia at Merriweather Post Pavilion in Columbia, Maryland. The event was called "Dear Jerry".

In 2015, Hunter and Garcia were inducted into the Songwriters Hall of Fame. Hunter accepted the award along with Garcia's daughter, Trixie Garcia, who accepted on behalf of her father.

In 2015, Jerry Garcia's wife, Manasha Garcia and their daughter, Keelin Garcia launched The Jerry Garcia Foundation, a nonprofit charity that supports projects for artistic, environmental, and humanitarian causes. The Foundation's Board members are Bob Weir, Peter Shapiro, Glenn Fischer, Irwin Sternberg, Daniel Shiner, TRI Studios CEO, Christopher McCutcheon and Fender Music Foundation Executive Director, Lynn Robison. Keelin Garcia said, "It is a tremendous honor to participate in nonprofit work that is in accordance with my father's values."

Jerry Garcia Symphonic Celebrations have occurred over several years (2013, 2014, 2016, 2022, and 2025) and in numerous venues. In addition to various symphony orchestras, participating musicians have included Warren Haynes, Jeff Sipe, Lincoln Schleifer, Jasmine Muhammad, Jaclyn LaBranch, Melvin Seals, Duane Trucks, Lady Chi, Dave Schools, Tom Hamilton, Oteil Burbridge, and John Morgan Kimock.

In 2017 Garcia's music was featured in Red Roses, Green Gold, an off-Broadway musical featuring the music of Garcia and Robert Hunter, with additional music by Phil Lesh, Bob Weir, Mickey Hart, and Hunter's longtime collaborator Greg Anton. The production was directed and choreographed by Rachel Klein, featured a book by Michael Norman Mann, had Jeff Chimenti serving as music supervisor, and was performed at the Minetta Lane Theatre in New York City.

In 2018, Jerry Garcia family members, Keelin Garcia and Manasha Garcia launched the Jerry Garcia Music Arts independent music label.

On November 18, 2021, it was announced Jonah Hill would portray Garcia in a forthcoming Grateful Dead biopic written by Scott Alexander and Larry Karaszewski directed by Martin Scorsese for Apple TV+. In an April, 2026 appearance on the "Tetragrammaton With Rick Rubin" podcast, Hill stated that the film was still in development, but he would not appear in it.

== Discography ==
Grateful Dead

- The Grateful Dead (1967)
- Anthem of the Sun (1968)
- Aoxomoxoa (1969)
- Live/Dead (1969)
- Workingman's Dead (1970)
- American Beauty (1970)
- Grateful Dead (Skull & Roses) (1971)
- Europe '72 (1972)
- Wake of the Flood (1973)
- From the Mars Hotel (1974)
- Blues for Allah (1975)
- Steal Your Face (1976)
- Terrapin Station (1977)
- Shakedown Street (1978)
- Go to Heaven (1980)
- Reckoning (1981)
- Dead Set (1981)
- In the Dark (1987)
- Dylan & the Dead (1989)
- Built to Last (1989)
- Without a Net (1990)

New Riders of the Purple Sage

- New Riders of the Purple Sage (1971)
- Vintage NRPS (1986)

Solo

- Garcia (1972)
- Garcia (1974)
- Reflections (1976)
- Run for the Roses (1982)

Collaborative

- Hooteroll? (With Howard Wales) (1971)
- Live at Keystone (With Merl Saunders, John Kahn, & Bill Vitt) (1973)
- Keystone Encores – (With Merl Saunders, John Kahn, & Bill Vitt) (1988)
- Jerry Garcia / David Grisman – (With David Grisman) (1991)
- Not for Kids Only – (with David Grisman) (1993)
- Shady Grove – (with David Grisman) (1996)

The Jerry Garcia Band

- Cats Under the Stars (1978)
- Jerry Garcia Band (1991)

Jerry Garcia’s Acoustic Band

- Almost Acoustic (1988)

Old & In The Way

- Old & In the Way – (1975)

== Sources ==
- "Jerome John Garcia", Encyclopædia Britannica, Encyclopædia Britannica, inc., August 5, 2019
- Greenfield, Robert (2012), Dark Star: An Oral Biography of Jerry Garcia, Harper Collins, ISBN 9780062268310
- Groer, Annie; Gerhart, Ann (April 9, 1996), "Jerry Garcia's Last Trip", The Washington Post
- Higashi, April, ed. (2005), Jerry Garcia: The Collected Artwork, Thunder's Mouth Press, ISBN 9781560257929
- Jackson, Blair (1999). Garcia: An American Life. Viking. ISBN 0670886602.
- Lesh, Phil (2005), Searching for the Sound: My Life with the Grateful Dead, Little, Brown and Company, ISBN 0-316-00998-9
- McNally, Dennis (2007), A Long Strange Trip: The Inside History of the Grateful Dead, Crown, ISBN 9780307418777
- Ashes of Jerry Garcia sprinkled into Ganges, London: The Orlando Sentinel, April 8, 1996
- Ruhlmann, William (n.d.), "Jerry Garcia", AllMusic, Netaktion LLC
- Stratton, Jerry (May 2, 2010), "News Accounts First", Negative Space
- Troy, Sandy (1994). Captain Trips: A Biography of Jerry Garcia (1st ed.). New York: Thunder's Mouth Press. ISBN 1560250909.

Awards
Preceded by Townes Van Zandt	AMA presidents Award; 2008	Succeeded by Lowell George
