= Jerry Garcia discography =

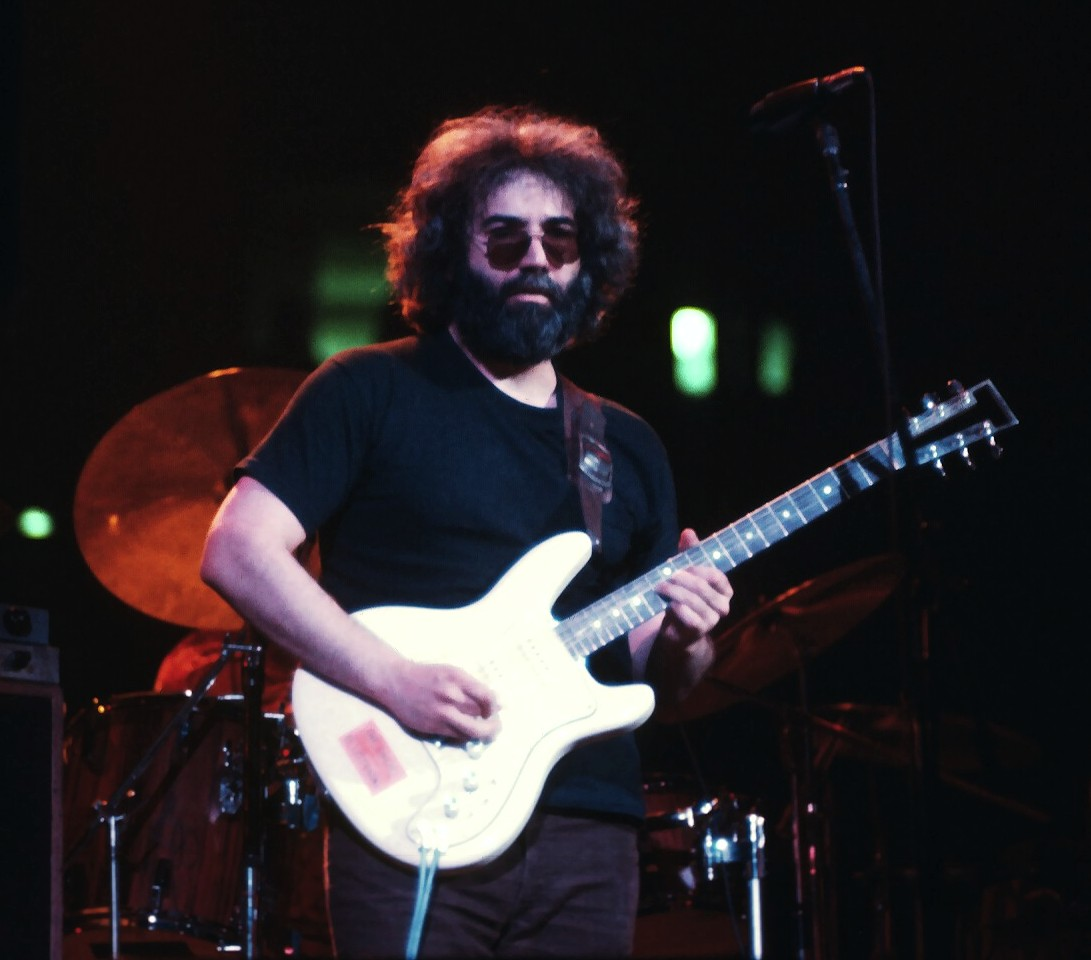
- Studio albums: 21
- Live albums: 61
- Compilation albums: 4
- Singles: 3
- As a guest musician: 47

Jerry Garcia was an American musician. A guitarist, singer, and songwriter, he became famous as a member of the rock band the Grateful Dead from 1965 to 1995. When not touring or recording with the Dead, Garcia was often playing music in other bands and with other musicians.

From 1971 to 1975, Garcia's main musical collaborator outside the Grateful Dead was keyboardist Merl Saunders. From 1975 to 1995, Garcia's principal side project was the Jerry Garcia Band. The one constant member of the Jerry Garcia Band, as well as the various Saunders–Garcia lineups, was John Kahn on bass. The Garcia Band member with the second-longest tenure, from 1980 to 1995, was keyboardist Melvin Seals. In the 1990s, Garcia also made a number of studio recordings with mandolin player David Grisman.

In 1969, Garcia, along with John Dawson and David Nelson, co-founded the country rock band the New Riders of the Purple Sage. Garcia played pedal steel guitar in that band, until an amicable parting of the ways in 1971. In 1973 Garcia co-founded the short-lived bluegrass group Old & In the Way, which also included David Grisman and John Kahn. Garcia played banjo in that band, harking back to his pre-Grateful Dead days as a bluegrass musician.

The Grateful Dead released a number of studio and live albums while they were together. Since then, many archival concert recordings of the band have been released as albums. The same is also true of Garcia's solo career and his collaborations with other musicians. As a result, the discography of Jerry Garcia, as a member of the Grateful Dead and as a solo musician, includes several hundred albums.

== Jerry Garcia ==
Title	Released	Notes	Peak chart position (US)
Garcia	January 1972; Warner Bros. BS 2582; LP	Studio album	35
Garcia	June 1974; Round RX 102; LP	Studio album; Also known as Compliments	49
Reflections	February 1976; Round RX 107; LP	Studio album	42
Run for the Roses	November 1982; Arista AL 9603; LP	Studio album	100

== Jerry Garcia Band ==
The Jerry Garcia Band was Jerry Garcia's main side project from 1975 to 1995. The band played rock music that emphasized musical improvisation, in a style somewhat similar to that of the Grateful Dead, and also played many rhythm and blues songs. The lineup of the band changed many times, especially in the early years. The only constant member was John Kahn on bass. The Garcia Band member with the second-longest tenure, from 1980 to 1995, was keyboardist Melvin Seals. After Garcia died, Seals formed a band called JGB, dedicated to performing Garcia's music.

Donna Jean Godchaux, who was in the Jerry Garcia Band from 1976 to 1978, later reflected, "It was very different from the Grateful Dead in that everything was so scaled back to where we could play theaters instead of hockey rinks. It was very enjoyable on that level because these places were built for music to be played in. It was just a really unique situation to be as popular as Jerry Garcia was and still be able to be in a band that could do what we did in a smaller setting than the Grateful Dead. It was kind of like a home away from home for Jerry, in that he got this different expression of what he was feeling musically than the Grateful Dead."

Title	Released	Notes	Peak chart position	
Title	Released	Notes	US	US Ind.
Cats Under the Stars	April 1978; Arista AB-4160; LP	Studio album	114	—
Jerry Garcia Band	August 27, 1991; Arista 18690-2; 2-disc CD	Recorded in spring and summer 1990 at the Warfield Theatre in San Francisco	97	—
How Sweet It Is	April 15, 1997; Grateful Dead GDCD 4051; CD	Recorded in spring and summer 1990 at the Warfield Theatre in San Francisco	81	—
Don't Let Go	January 23, 2001; Grateful Dead GDCD 4078; 2-disc CD	Recorded May 21, 1976, at the Orpheum Theatre in San Francisco	137	—
Shining Star	March 20, 2001; Grateful Dead GDCD 4079; 2-disc CD	Recorded 1989 – 1993 at various venues	194	—
Pure Jerry: Theatre 1839, San Francisco, July 29 & 30, 1977	June 1, 2004; Jerry Made JGCD 0001; 3-disc CD	Pure Jerry #1; Recorded July 29–30, 1977 at Theatre 1839 in San Francisco	—	—
After Midnight: Kean College, 2/28/80	September 28, 2004; Rhino R2 76536; 3-disc CD	Recorded February 28, 1980, at Kean College in Union, New Jersey	118	—
Pure Jerry: Lunt-Fontanne, New York City, October 31, 1987	November 2004; Jerry Made JGCD 0002; 4-disc CD	Pure Jerry #2; Includes performances by the Jerry Garcia Band and the Jerry Garcia Acoustic Band; Recorded October 31, 1987, at the Lunt-Fontanne Theatre in New York City	—	—
Pure Jerry: Lunt-Fontanne, New York City, The Best of the Rest, October 15–30, 1987	November 2004; Jerry Made JGCD 0003; 3-disc CD	Pure Jerry #3; Includes performances by the Jerry Garcia Band and the Jerry Garcia Acoustic Band; Recorded October 15–30, 1987 at the Lunt-Fontanne Theatre in New York City	—	—
Pure Jerry: Merriweather Post Pavilion, September 1 & 2, 1989	March 25, 2005; Jerry Made JGCD 0005; 4-disc CD	Pure Jerry #5; Recorded September 1–2, 1989 at the Merriweather Post Pavilion in Columbia, Maryland	—	—
Pure Jerry: Warner Theatre, March 18, 1978	August 9, 2005; Jerry Made JGCD 0006; 2-disc CD	Pure Jerry #6; Recorded March 18, 1978, at the Warner Theatre in Washington, D.C.	—	—
Pure Jerry: Coliseum, Hampton, VA, November 9, 1991	August 1, 2006; Jerry Made JGCD 0007; 2-disc CD	Pure Jerry #7; Recorded November 9, 1991, at the Hampton Coliseum in Hampton, Virginia	—	—
Pure Jerry: Bay Area 1978	August 31, 2009; Jerry Made JGCD 0009; 2-disc CD	Pure Jerry #9; Recorded February – June 1978 at various venues in the San Francisco Bay Area	—	—
Let It Rock: The Jerry Garcia Collection, Vol. 2	November 10, 2009; Jerry Made JGCD 0010; 2-disc CD	Recorded November 17–18, 1975 at the Keystone in Berkeley, California	—	—
Garcia Live Volume One	February 19, 2013; ATO JGFRR 1001; 3-disc CD	Recorded March 1, 1980, at the Capitol Theatre in Passaic, New Jersey	87	15
June 26, 1981, Warfield Theatre, San Francisco, CA	April 1, 2013; digital download	Garcia Live Volume 1.5; Recorded June 26, 1981, at the Warfield Theatre in San Francisco	—	—
Garcia Live Volume Two	June 25, 2013; ATO JGFRR 1002; 2-disc CD	Recorded August 5, 1990, at the Greek Theatre in Berkeley, California	82	24
Fall 1989: The Long Island Sound	December 17, 2013; ATO JGFRR 1004; 6-disc CD	Includes performances by the Jerry Garcia Band and by Bob Weir & Rob Wasserman; Recorded September 5, 1989, at the Hartford Civic Center in Hartford, Connecticut and September 6, 1989, at Nassau Coliseum in Uniondale, New York	—	37
Garcia Live Volume Four	July 8, 2014; ATO JGFRR 1005; 2-disc CD	Recorded March 22, 1978, at Veteran's Hall in Sebastopol, California	74	13
Garcia Live Volume Five	October 21, 2014; ATO JGFRR 1006; 2-disc CD	Recorded December 31, 1975, at the Keystone in Berkeley, California	81	10
On Broadway: Act One – October 28th, 1987	June 23, 2015; ATO JGFRR 1008; 3-disc CD	Includes performances by the Jerry Garcia Band and the Jerry Garcia Acoustic Band; Recorded October 28, 1987, at the Lunt-Fontanne Theatre in New York City	—	19
Garcia Live Volume Seven	August 19, 2016; ATO JGFRR 1010; 2-disc CD	Recorded November 8, 1976, at Sophie's in Palo Alto, California	193	13
Garcia Live Volume Eight	March 10, 2017; ATO JGFRR 1014; 2-disc CD	Recorded November 23, 1991, at the Bradley Center in Milwaukee	96	2
Garcia Live Volume 10	February 23, 2018; ATO JGFRR 1019; 2-disc CD	Recorded May 20, 1990, at the Hilo Civic Auditorium in Hilo, Hawaii	153	4
Electric on the Eel	March 15, 2019; ATO JGFRR 1021; 6-disc CD	Recorded August 29, 1987, June 10, 1989, and August 10, 1991, at French's Camp in Piercy, California	154	1
Garcia Live Volume 11	July 12, 2019; ATO JGFRR 1027; 2-disc CD	Recorded December 11, 1993, at the Providence Civic Center in Providence, Rhode Island	—	6
Garcia Live Volume 13	April 24, 2020; ATO JGFRR 1031; 2-disc CD	Recorded September 16, 1989, at the Poplar Creek Music Theatre in Hoffman Estates, Illinois	—	—
Garcia Live Volume 16	June 25, 2021; ATO JGFRR 1037; 3-disc CD	Recorded November 15, 1991, at Madison Square Garden in New York City	—	—
Garcia Live Volume 17	November 12, 2021; ATO JGFRR 1038; 3-disc CD	Recorded November 7–13, 1976 at various venues	—	—
Garcia Live Volume 19	October 28, 2022; ATO JGFRR 1043; 2-disc CD	Recorded October 31, 1992 at Oakland Coliseum Arena in Oakland, California	—	—
Garcia Live Volume 20	June 30, 2023; ATO JGFRR 1047; 2-disc CD	Recorded June 18, 1982 at the Cape Cod Coliseum in South Yarmouth, Massachusetts	—	—
Garcia Live Volume 21	June 14, 2024; ATO JGFRR 1054; 2-disc CD	Recorded February 13, 1976 at the Keystone in Berkeley, California	—	—
Live at the Warfield	August 15, 2025; ATO JGFRR 1061; 6-disc CD	Recorded February 28 – March 2, 1991 at the Warfield Theatre in San Francisco, California	—	—
Garcia Live Volume 23	October 30, 2026; ATO JGFRR 1071; 2-disc CD	Recorded August 14, 1993 at the Shoreline Amphitheatre in Mountain View, California	—	—

== Jerry Garcia Acoustic Band ==
The Jerry Garcia Acoustic Band played folk and old-time music. They were together for about a year, from 1987 to 1988. They performed several dozen concerts, usually as the opening act for the Jerry Garcia Band. The JGAB included two musicians who had played with Garcia in 1964 in a bluegrass band called the Black Mountain Boys – Sandy Rothman and David Nelson.

Title	Released	Notes	Peak chart position	
Title	Released	Notes	US	Folk
Almost Acoustic	December 6, 1988; Grateful Dead GDCD 4005; CD	Recorded November – December 1987 at Warfield Theatre in San Francisco and the Wiltern Theatre in Los Angeles	—	—
Ragged but Right	November 16, 2010; Jerry Made JGCD 1003; CD	Recorded October – December 1987 at the Lunt-Fontanne Theatre in New York City, the Warfield Theatre in San Francisco, and the Wiltern Theatre in Los Angeles	—	15

== Jerry Garcia and Howard Wales ==
Howard Wales was a jazz, rock, and rhythm and blues keyboard player. In 1970 he played a number of Monday night jam sessions with Garcia at the Matrix, a small venue in San Francisco. The two were often accompanied by John Kahn on bass and Bill Vitt on drums.

Later, Kahn recalled, "I didn't know what kind of music [Garcia] and Wales would be playing down at the Matrix when I went down. And I still don't know! It was kind of a weird jazz with these other influences – it was mainly Howard's music, all instrumental." Garcia said, "Howard was so incredible, and [Kahn and I] were just hanging on for dear life. For some reason Howard enjoyed playing with us, but we were just keeping up. Howard was so outside. For both of us that was a wonderful experience."

Title	Released	Notes	Peak chart position (US)
Hooteroll?	November 1971; Douglas KZ 30859; LP	Studio album	—
Side Trips, Volume One	October 1998; Grateful Dead GDCD 4061; CD	Recorded in 1970 at the Matrix in San Francisco	—

== Jerry Garcia and Merl Saunders ==
Merl Saunders, a keyboard player, was Garcia's main musical collaborator outside the Grateful Dead from 1971 to 1975. Saunders and Garcia bands with different additional musicians played many concerts during this period. One of the lineups, in 1974 and 1975, was Legion of Mary, featuring Martin Fierro on saxophone and flute, John Kahn on bass, and Ron Tutt on drums. Saunders and Garcia also recorded two studio albums with Tom Fogerty from Creedence Clearwater Revival.

Garcia later recalled, "[Saunders] really helped me improve myself on a level of harmonic understanding.... He filled me in on all those years of things I didn't do. I'd never played any standards; I'd never played in dance bands. I never had any approach to the world of regular, straight music. He knows all the standards, and he taught me how bebop works. He taught me music. Between the combination of Howard [Wales] and Merl, that's where I really learned music. Before it was sort of, 'Okay, where do I plug in?' I picked up the adult version of a musical attitude from those guys."

Title	Artist	Released	Notes	Peak chart position	
Title	Artist	Released	Notes	US	US Ind.
Heavy Turbulence	Merl Saunders	February 1972; Fantasy 8421; LP	Studio album	—	—
Fire Up	Merl Saunders featuring Jerry Garcia and Tom Fogerty	May 1973; Fantasy 9421; LP	Studio album	197	—
Live at Keystone	Merl Saunders, Jerry Garcia, John Kahn, Bill Vitt	December 1973; Fantasy F-79002; 2-disc LP; re-released in 1988 as two separate CDs	Recorded July 10–11, 1973 at the Keystone in Berkeley, California	—	—
Keystone Encores	Merl Saunders, Jerry Garcia, John Kahn, Bill Vitt	March 1988; Fantasy FCD-7703-2; CD; also released as two separate LPs	Recorded July 10–11, 1973 at the Keystone in Berkeley, California	—	—
Fire Up Plus	Merl Saunders and Friends	July 9, 1992; Fantasy FCD-7711-2; CD	Compilation album including all of Heavy Turbulence and most of Fire Up	—	—
Pure Jerry: Keystone Berkeley, September 1, 1974	Jerry Garcia & Merl Saunders Band	December 28, 2004; Jerry Made JGCD 0004; 3-disc CD	Pure Jerry #4; Recorded September 1, 1974, at the Keystone in Berkeley, California	—	—
Legion of Mary: The Jerry Garcia Collection, Vol. 1	Legion of Mary	August 13, 2005; Rhino R2 74692; 2-disc CD	Recorded December 1974 – July 1975 at various venues	190	—
Well-Matched: The Best of Merl Saunders & Jerry Garcia	Merl Saunders and Jerry Garcia	May 23, 2006; Fantasy FCD-30019-2; CD	Compilation of selections from Heavy Turbulence, Fire Up, Live at Keystone, Keystone Encores, and Keepers	—	—
Keystone Companions: The Complete 1973 Fantasy Recordings	Merl Saunders and Jerry Garcia	September 25, 2012; Fantasy FAN-33796; 4-disc CD	Recorded July 10–11, 1973 at the Keystone in Berkeley, California	—	—
Garcia Live Volume Three	Legion of Mary	October 15, 2013; ATO JGFRR 1003; 3-disc CD	Recorded December 14, 1974, at the Paramount Theatre in Portland, Oregon and December 15, 1974, at the EMU Ballroom in Eugene, Oregon	102	25
Garcia Live Volume Six	Jerry Garcia and Merl Saunders	June 24, 2016; ATO JGFRR 1009; 3-disc CD	Recorded July 5, 1973, at the Lion's Share in San Anselmo, California	—	12
Garcia Live Volume Nine	Jerry Garcia and Merl Saunders	July 28, 2017; ATO JGFRR 1015; 2-disc CD	Recorded August 11, 1974, at the Keystone in Berkeley, California	—	8
Garcia Live Volume 12	Jerry Garcia and Merl Saunders	December 20, 2019; ATO JGFRR 1029; 3-disc CD	Recorded January 23, 1973 at the Boarding House in San Francisco, California	—	7
Garcia Live Volume 15	Jerry Garcia and Merl Saunders	December 4, 2020; ATO JGFRR 1036; 2-disc CD	Recorded May 21, 1971 at the Keystone Korner in San Francisco, California	—	—
Garcia Live Volume 18	Jerry Garcia and Merl Saunders	June 10, 2022; ATO JGFRR 1041; 2-disc CD	Recorded November 2, 1974 at the Keystone in Berkeley, California	—	—
Garcia Live Volume 22	Jerry Garcia and Merl Saunders	May 1, 2026; ATO; 2-disc CD	Recorded September 25, 1971 at the Lion's Share in San Anselmo, California	—	—

== Jerry Garcia and David Grisman ==
David Grisman is a mandolin player. He can be heard on two songs on the 1970 Grateful Dead album American Beauty. In 1973 he and Garcia played in the bluegrass band Old & In the Way. From 1990 to 1995, Garcia and Grisman recorded dozens of studio sessions playing acoustic music – mostly folk, old time, and bluegrass songs – sometimes as a duo and sometimes with other musicians. They also played some live shows during this period.

Title	Released	Notes	Peak chart position	
Title	Released	Notes	US	US Ind.
Jerry Garcia / David Grisman	August 23, 1991; Acoustic Disc ACD-2; CD	Studio album	—	—
Not for Kids Only	October 20, 1993; Acoustic Disc ACD-9; CD	Studio album	—	—
Shady Grove	1996; Acoustic Disc ACD-21; CD	Studio album; Recorded 1990 – 1993	135	—
So What	August 1998; Acoustic Disc ACD-33; CD	Studio album; Recorded 1990 – 1992	—	—
The Pizza Tapes	April 25, 2000; Acoustic Disc ACD-41; CD	Jerry Garcia, David Grisman, Tony Rice; Studio album; Recorded February 4 and 5, 1993	—	12
Grateful Dawg	September 11, 2001; Acoustic Disc ACD-46; CD	Soundtrack album for the Grateful Dawg documentary film	—	—
Been All Around This World	March 6, 2004; Acoustic Disc ACD-57; CD	Studio album; Recorded in the early 1990s	—	16
The Pizza Tapes: Extra Large Edition	January 4, 2011; Acoustic Disc ACD-73; 3-disc CD	Jerry Garcia, David Grisman, Tony Rice; Studio album; Recorded February 4 and 5, 1993	—	—
Garcia/Grisman: Alternate	July 2012; Acoustic Oasis; digital download	Studio album; Recorded in the early 1990s	—	—
Bare Bones	December 13, 2024; Acoustic Disc JGFRR 1055; CD, LP	Studio album; Recorded in the early 1990s	—	—

== Jerry Garcia and John Kahn ==
John Kahn played bass – either bass guitar or stand-up bass – in most of Jerry Garcia's bands outside the Grateful Dead. These included the Jerry Garcia Band, the various lineups of Merl Saunders and Jerry Garcia, Old & In the Way, and the Jerry Garcia Acoustic Band. In 1979, Garcia played in Kahn's band Reconstruction. In the 1980s Garcia and Kahn also played some acoustic concerts as a duo.

Title	Released	Notes	Peak chart position (US)
Pure Jerry: Marin Veterans Memorial Auditorium, San Rafael, California, February 28, 1986	March 25, 2009; Jerry Made JGCD 0008; CD	Pure Jerry #8; Recorded February 28, 1986, at Marin Veterans Memorial Auditorium in San Rafael, California	—
Garcia Live Volume 14	July 24, 2020; ATO JGFRR 1032; CD, LP	Recorded January 27, 1986, at the Ritz in New York City	—

== New Riders of the Purple Sage ==
The New Riders of the Purple Sage, a country rock band, was founded in 1969 by Jerry Garcia, John Dawson, and David Nelson. Garcia played pedal steel guitar, and left the singing to the other members of the group. Originally Phil Lesh played bass and Mickey Hart played drums; they were subsequently replaced by Dave Torbert and Spencer Dryden, respectively. For a period of about two years, the New Riders would sometimes perform as the opening act for the Grateful Dead. In 1971, Garcia left the band, replaced on pedal steel by Buddy Cage. This allowed NRPS to tour independently of the Dead. They stayed together for many years, and released a number of albums. In 2005, Nelson and Cage re-formed the band with several new members.

Title	Released	Notes	Peak chart position (US)
New Riders of the Purple Sage	August 1971; Columbia C 30888; LP	Studio album	39
Vintage NRPS	October 1986; Relix RRLP 2025; LP and CD	Recorded February 21 and 23, 1971 at the Capitol Theatre in Port Chester, New York	—
Bear's Sonic Journals: Dawn of the New Riders of the Purple Sage	January 10, 2020; Owsley Stanley Foundation; 5-disc CD	Recorded August 1, 1969 – June 4, 1970, at various venues	—

== Old & In the Way ==
Old & In the Way was a bluegrass band that performed about 25 concerts in 1973. Its best-known lineup was Jerry Garcia on banjo, Peter Rowan on guitar, David Grisman on mandolin, John Kahn on bass, and Vassar Clements on fiddle.

Author Jeff Tamarkin wrote, "Although OAITW was able to handle a traditional bluegrass number – vocal or instrumental – as well as anyone, the musicians brought a jam band sensibility and rock attitude to the proceedings, extending the instrumental segments with improvisations, something alien to bluegrass up to that point. By doing so, the quintet pretty much invented the concept of progressive bluegrass..."

Title	Released	Notes	Peak chart position	
Title	Released	Notes	US	Blue.
Old & In the Way	February 1975; Round RX 103; LP	Recorded October 8, 1973, at the Boarding House in San Francisco	—	—
That High Lonesome Sound	February 20, 1996; Acoustic Disc ACD-19; CD	Recorded October 1973 at the Boarding House in San Francisco	—	—
Breakdown	November 18, 1997; Acoustic Disc ACD-28; CD	Recorded October 1973 at the Boarding House in San Francisco	—	—
Live at the Boarding House	November 4, 2008; Acoustic Oasis; digital download	Recorded October 8, 1973, at the Boarding House in San Francisco	—	—
Live at the Boarding House: The Complete Shows	October 1, 2013; Acoustic Disc ACD-81; 4-disc CD	Recorded October 1 and 8, 1973, at the Boarding House in San Francisco	—	3
Live at Sonoma State – 11/4/73	November 4, 2023; Round JGFRR 1065; 2-disc LP	Recorded November 4, 1973, at Sonoma State College in Rohnert Park, California	—	—

== Pre-Grateful Dead bands ==
In the early 1960s, after getting out of the Army, Jerry Garcia started playing folk and old-time music. Garcia would sing and play acoustic guitar as a member of various ensembles. Over the next few years, he also become interested in bluegrass music, and learned to play the banjo. During this time he was a member of a number of different bands, including the Sleepy Hollow Hog Stompers, the Hart Valley Drifters, the Wildwood Boys, and the Black Mountain Boys. Subsequently, he co-founded a jug band called Mother McCree's Uptown Jug Champions. The jug band was a precursor of the Grateful Dead, as its members also included Bob Weir and Ron "Pigpen" McKernan.

Title	Artist	Released	Notes	Peak chart position	
Title	Artist	Released	Notes	US	Folk
Mother McCree's Uptown Jug Champions	Mother McCree's Uptown Jug Champions	1999; Grateful Dead GDCD 4064; CD	Recorded July 1964 at the Top of the Tangent in Palo Alto, California	—	—
Folk Time	Hart Valley Drifters	November 11, 2016; ATO JGFRR 1011; CD	Recorded in 1962 at the studios of KZSU in Stanford, California	—	5
Before the Dead	Various artists	May 11, 2018; ATO JGFRR 1016; 4-disc CD	Recorded 1961 – 1964 at various venues in the San Francisco Bay Area	—	13

== Heads & Tails LPs ==
Heads & Tails is a series of vinyl LPs. On each album, each side of the record contains selected music from a different live performance by Jerry Garcia and various other musicians.

Title	Released	Notes	Peak chart position (US)
Heads & Tails: Volume 1	November 3, 2023; Round JGFRR1050; LP	Jerry Garcia and Merl Saunders recorded January 19, 1972 at the Lion's Share in San Anselmo, California; Jerry Garcia Band recorded February 5, 1988 at Veterans Memorial Auditorium in Santa Rosa, California	—
Heads & Tails: Volume 2	December 4, 2026; Round Records; LP	Jerry Garcia Band recorded January 26, 1976 at the Keystone in Berkeley, California; Jerry Garcia Band recorded August 8, 1993 at Portland Meadows in Portland, Oregon	—

== Compilations and box sets ==
Title	Released	Notes	Peak chart position (US)
All Good Things: Jerry Garcia Studio Sessions	April 20, 2004; Rhino R2 78063; 6-disc CD	Box set containing the albums Garcia (1972), Garcia (1974), Reflections, Run for the Roses, and Cats Under the Stars, with bonus tracks and a bonus disc	175
Garcia Plays Dylan	October 25, 2005; Rhino R2 73263; 2-disc CD	Compilation of Garcia performing Bob Dylan songs with the Grateful Dead, the Jerry Garcia Band, Jerry Garcia and Merl Saunders, and Legion of Mary	—
The Very Best of Jerry Garcia	September 26, 2006; Rhino R2 73391; 2-disc CD	Disc 1 compiles tracks from the five studio albums by Jerry Garcia or the Jerry Garcia Band. Disc 2 compiles live performances by the Jerry Garcia Band, the Jerry Garcia Acoustic Band, Old & In the Way, and Reconstruction.	166
Might As Well: A Round Records Retrospective	August 4, 2023; ATO JGFRR 1048; 2-disc LP	Selections from Garcia, Reflections, Cats Under the Stars, and Run for the Roses	—

== With other artists ==
Title	Artist	Released	Notes	Peak chart position (US)
Surrealistic Pillow	Jefferson Airplane	February 1, 1967; RCA Victor LSP-3766; LP	Garcia is credited as "musical and spiritual advisor" and he plays guitar on several tracks, but the exact nature of his contributions is uncertain	3
Volunteers	Jefferson Airplane	November 1969; RCA Victor LSP-4238; LP	Garcia plays pedal steel guitar on one track	13
Tarkio	Brewer & Shipley	1970; Kama Sutra KSBS 2024; LP	Garcia plays pedal steel guitar on one track; John Kahn and Bill Vitt also appear	34
Déjà Vu	Crosby, Stills, Nash & Young	March 11, 1970; Atlantic SD 7200; LP	Garcia plays pedal steel guitar on "Teach Your Children"	1
Marrying Maiden	It's a Beautiful Day	June 1970; Columbia CS 1058; LP	Garcia plays pedal steel guitar on one track and banjo on one track	28
Blows Against the Empire	Paul Kantner	November 1970; RCA Victor LSP-4448; LP	Garcia plays on multiple tracks, as do other musicians from the Planet Earth Rock and Roll Orchestra (members of Jefferson Airplane, the Grateful Dead, Quicksilver Messenger Service, and Crosby, Stills, & Nash)	20
If I Could Only Remember My Name	David Crosby	February 22, 1971; Atlantic SD 7203; LP	Garcia plays on multiple tracks, as do other musicians from the Planet Earth Rock and Roll Orchestra	12
Songs for Beginners	Graham Nash	May 28, 1971; Atlantic SD 7204; LP	Garcia plays on two tracks, and Phil Lesh plays on one track	15
Stephen Stills 2	Stephen Stills	June 30, 1971; Atlantic SD 7206; LP	Garcia plays pedal steel guitar on one track	8
Sunfighter	Paul Kantner and Grace Slick	November 1971; Grunt FTR-1002; LP	Garcia plays on three tracks; the album features musicians from the Planet Earth Rock and Roll Orchestra	89
Papa John Creach	Papa John Creach	December 1971; Grunt FTR-1003; LP	Garcia plays guitar on one track	94
Powerglide	New Riders of the Purple Sage	March 1972; Columbia KC 31284; LP	Garcia plays banjo on two tracks and piano on one track; Bill Kreutzmann plays percussion on two tracks	33
Graham Nash David Crosby	Graham Nash and David Crosby	April 5, 1972; Atlantic SD 7220; LP	Garcia plays pedal steel guitar on one track; on another track he plays guitar, with Phil Lesh on bass and Bill Kreutzmann on drums	4
Ace	Bob Weir	May 1972; Warner Bros. BS 2627; LP	Garcia and the other members of the Grateful Dead at that time – Bob Weir, Keith Godchaux, Donna Jean Godchaux, Phil Lesh, and Bill Kreutzmann – play on all the tracks	68
Rolling Thunder	Mickey Hart	September 1972; Warner Bros. BS 2635; LP	Garcia, Bob Weir, and Phil Lesh play on some tracks, along with other musicians from the Planet Earth Rock and Roll Orchestra	190
Excalibur	Tom Fogerty	October 1972; Fantasy 9413; LP	Garcia, Merl Saunders, John Kahn, and Bill Vitt play on all the tracks	—
Demon in Disguise	David Bromberg	1972; Columbia C 31753; LP	Garcia plays on two tracks, along with Keith Godchaux, Donna Jean Godchaux, Phil Lesh, and Bill Kreutzmann	—
Rowan Brothers	The Rowan Brothers	1972; Columbia KC 31297; LP	Garcia and Bill Kreutzmann appear on this album, as does David Grisman, though it's uncertain which tracks they play on	—
Baron von Tollbooth & the Chrome Nun	Paul Kantner, Grace Slick, David Freiberg	May 1973; Grunt BFL1-0148; LP	Garcia plays on eight of the ten tracks; Mickey Hart plays on two tracks; also featured are other musicians from the Planet Earth Rock and Roll Orchestra	120
Angel Clare	Art Garfunkel	September 11, 1973; Columbia KC 31474; LP	Garcia plays banjo on one track	5
Wanted Dead or Alive	David Bromberg	January 1974; Columbia C 32717; LP	Garcia plays on about half the tracks, along with Keith Godchaux, Phil Lesh, and Bill Kreutzmann	167
Tales of the Great Rum Runners	Robert Hunter	June 1974; Round RX 101; LP	Garcia plays on two tracks; Mickey Hart, Keith Godchaux, and Donna Dean Godchaux also play on this album	—
Keith & Donna	Keith Godchaux and Donna Jean Godchaux	March 1975; Round RX 104; LP	Garcia plays guitar on all the tracks, and sings some background vocals	—
Tiger Rose	Robert Hunter	March 1975; Round RX 105; LP	Garcia plays on all the tracks; Mickey Hart and Donna Dean Godchaux also play on this album	—
Seastones	Ned Lagin	April 1975; Round RX 106; LP	Garcia plays guitar and does some voice work; Phil Lesh plays bass and Mickey Hart plays percussion	—
Oh, What a Mighty Time	New Riders of the Purple Sage	1975; Columbia PC 33688; LP	Garcia plays guitar on three tracks	144
Diga	Diga Rhythm Band	March 1976; Round RX 110; LP	Garcia plays guitar on two tracks	—
Texican Badman	Peter Rowan	1980; Appaloosa AP 010; LP	Garcia and Bill Kreutzmann play on four tracks	—
Before Time Began	New Riders of the Purple Sage	1986; Relix RRLP 2024; LP, CD	Several of the tracks are from the earliest NRPS recording sessions in 1969, with Garcia playing pedal steel guitar, Phil Lesh on bass, and Mickey Hart on drums	—
Liberty	Robert Hunter	March 1988; Relix RRLP 2029; LP, CD	Garcia plays guitar on all the tracks	—
Virgin Beauty	Ornette Coleman	June 1988; Portrait OR 44301; LP, CD	Garcia plays guitar on three tracks	—
Watchfire	Pete Sears	1988; Redwood RR-8806; LP, CD	Garcia plays on three tracks and Mickey Hart plays on one track	—
Transverse City	Warren Zevon	October 1989; Virgin 91068-1; LP, CD	Garcia plays guitar on two tracks	—
Blues from the Rainforest: A Musical Suite	Merl Saunders	April 1990; Summertone S2CD-01; CD	Garcia plays electric guitar, acoustic guitar, or MIDI guitar on four of the six tracks	—
A Night on the Town	Bruce Hornsby and the Range	May 25, 1990; RCA PL 82041; LP, CD	Garcia plays guitar on two tracks.	20
At the Edge	Mickey Hart	September 1990; Rykodisc RCD 10124; CD	Garcia plays on three tracks	—
Superstitious Blues	Country Joe McDonald	January 1991; Rykodisc RCD 10201; CD	Garcia plays on four tracks	—
Bluegrass Reunion	Red Allen, David Grisman, Herb Pederson, Jim Buchanan, James Kerwin	May 1991; Acoustic Disc ACD-4; CD	Garcia plays on three tracks	—
Devout Catalyst	Ken Nordine	January 1992; Grateful Dead GDCD 40152; CD	Garcia plays acoustic guitar and David Grisman plays mandolin on this spoken word album	—
Astronauts & Heretics	Thomas Dolby	November 3, 1992; Giant 9 24478-2; CD	Garcia and Bob Weir play on one track	—
Harbor Lights	Bruce Hornsby	April 6, 1993; RCA 66114-2; CD	Garcia plays guitar on two tracks	46
Trios	Rob Wasserman	February 1994; MCA MGD-4021; CD	Garcia plays guitar on two tracks; Bob Weir and Bruce Hornsby each play on one track	—
Hot House	Bruce Hornsby	July 18, 1995; RCA 66584-2; CD	Garcia plays guitar on one track.	68
Blue Incantation	Sanjay Mishra	August 1995; Rykodisc RCD 10409; CD	Garcia plays guitar on three tracks	—
The Songs of Jimmie Rodgers: A Tribute	Various artists	August 19, 1997; Egyptian 485189 2; CD	Garcia plays guitar and sings on one track, along with David Grisman and John Kahn	—
Keepers	Merl Saunders and Friends	October 21, 1997; Fantasy FCD-7712-2; CD	Compilation of various Merl Saunders tracks from the early 1970s, many of them with Garcia	—
New Train	Paul Pena	September 26, 2000; Hybrid HY 20019; CD	Studio album recorded in 1973; Garcia plays pedal steel guitar and Merl Saunders plays keyboards on two tracks	—
Good Old Boys Live: Drink Up & Go Home	The Good Old Boys	December 18, 2018; Rockbeat ROC-3412; 2-disc CD	Recorded February 20 and 21, 1975 at Margarita's Cantina in Santa Cruz, California; Garcia plays banjo on all the tracks	—
Trouble No More: 50th Anniversary Collection	The Allman Brothers Band	February 28, 2020; Mercury B0030769-01; 5-disc CD or 10-disc LP	Garcia, Bob Weir, and Robbie Robertson play guitar on "Mountain Jam"	—
Bear's Sonic Journals: Sing Out!	Various artists	February 23, 2024; Owsley Stanley Foundation; 3-disc CD	Recorded April 25, 1981. Garcia, Weir, Kahn, Kreutzmann, and Hart play nine songs.	—

== Singles ==
Title (A-side / B-side)	Released	Album	Peak chart position (US)
"The Wheel" / "Deal"	1972; Warner Bros. WB 7551	Garcia (1972)	—
"Sugaree" / "Eep Hour"	1972; Warner Bros. WB 7569	Garcia (1972)	94
"Let It Rock" / "Midnight Town"	1974; Round RX 4504	Garcia (1974)	—

== Live albums by recording date ==
Album	Recording date(s)	Notes
Before the Dead	1961–1964	
Folk Time	1962	
Mother McCree's Uptown Jug Champions	July 1964	
Side Trips, Volume One	1970	
Vintage NRPS	February 21–23, 1971	
Garcia Live Volume 15	May 21, 1971	
Garcia Live Volume 22	September 25, 1971	
Garcia Live Volume 12	January 23, 1973	complete show
Garcia Live Volume Six	July 5, 1973	
Live at Keystone	July 10–11, 1973	
Keystone Encores	July 10–11, 1973	
Keystone Companions: The Complete 1973 Fantasy Recordings	July 10–11, 1973	
Old & In the Way	October 1973	
That High Lonesome Sound	October 1973	
Breakdown	October 1973	
Live at the Boarding House: The Complete Shows	October 1–8, 1973	two complete shows
Live at the Boarding House	October 8, 1973	complete show
Live at Sonoma State – 11/4/73	November 4, 1973	complete show
Garcia Live Volume Nine	August 11, 1974	complete show
Pure Jerry 4: Keystone Berkeley	September 1, 1974	complete show
Garcia Live Volume 18	November 2, 1974	complete show
Legion of Mary: The Jerry Garcia Collection, Vol. 1	December 1974 – July 1975	
Garcia Live Volume Three	December 14–15, 1974	
Let It Rock: The Jerry Garcia Collection, Vol. 2	November 17–18, 1975	
Garcia Live Volume Five	December 31, 1975	complete show
Garcia Live Volume 21	February 13, 1976	
Don't Let Go	May 21, 1976	complete show
Garcia Live Volume 17	November 7–13, 1976	
Garcia Live Volume Seven	November 8, 1976	complete show
Pure Jerry 1: Theatre 1839, San Francisco	July 29–30, 1977	
Pure Jerry 9: Bay Area 1978	February – June 1978	
Pure Jerry 6: Warner Theatre	March 18, 1978	complete early and late shows
Garcia Live Volume Four	March 22, 1978	complete show
After Midnight: Kean College, 2/28/80	February 28, 1980	complete early and late shows
Garcia Live Volume One	March 1, 1980	complete early and late shows
June 26, 1981, Warfield Theatre, San Francisco, CA	June 26, 1981	second set
Garcia Live Volume 20	June 18, 1982	complete show
Garcia Live Volume 14	January 27, 1986	complete show
Pure Jerry 8: Marin Veterans Memorial Auditorium, San Rafael, California	February 28, 1986	complete show
Electric on the Eel	August 29, 1987 – August 10, 1991	three complete shows
Ragged but Right	October – December 1987	
Pure Jerry 3: Lunt-Fontanne, New York City, The Best of the Rest	October 15–30, 1987	
On Broadway: Act One – October 28th, 1987	October 28, 1987	acoustic set of early show, complete late show
Pure Jerry 2: Lunt-Fontanne, New York City	October 31, 1987	complete early and late shows
Almost Acoustic	November – December 1987	
Shining Star	1989–1993	
Pure Jerry 5: Merriweather Post Pavilion	September 1–2, 1989	complete show
Fall 1989: The Long Island Sound	September 5−6, 1989	two complete shows; includes Weir/Wasserman sets
Garcia Live Volume 13	September 16, 1989	complete show
Jerry Garcia Band	spring and summer 1990	
How Sweet It Is	spring and summer 1990	
Garcia Live Volume 10	May 20, 1990	complete show
Garcia Live Volume Two	August 5, 1990	complete show
Live at the Warfield	February 28 – March 2, 1991	three complete shows
Pure Jerry 7: Coliseum, Hampton, VA	November 9, 1991	complete show
Garcia Live Volume 16	November 15, 1991	complete show
Garcia Live Volume Eight	November 23, 1991	complete show
Garcia Live Volume 19	October 31, 1992	complete show
Garcia Live Volume 23	August 13, 1993	complete show
Garcia Live Volume 11	November 11, 1993	complete show
