= Acoustic Planet =

Studio album by Craig Chaquico
- Released: November 12, 1994
- Studio: Lunatunes, Mill Valley, CA
- Genre: New age, smooth jazz, classic rock
- Length: 42:00
- Producer: Craig Chaquico, Ozzie Ahlers

Craig Chaquico chronology
Acoustic Highway (1993)	Acoustic Planet (1994)	A Thousand Pictures (1996)

Professional ratings
Review scores
Source	Rating
AllMusic	4.5/5 stars

Acoustic Planet is the second solo album by American guitarist, producer, and composer Craig Chaquico. It was released a year after his first solo album, Acoustic Highway.

The album received a Grammy nomination in 1994 for Best New Age Album.

== Background and recording ==
When Chaquico left Starship in 1990, he began looking for a new musical direction, opting for a solo career as a jazz and New Age instrumentalist to showcase his acoustic music. Acoustic Planet is his second album of this solo direction. The album was recorded at Chaquico's Lunatunes Studio in Mill Valley, California, mixed at Auravision Studios in Ojai, California, and mastered at Quad Tech Studios in Los Angeles.

== Accolades ==
Acoustic Planet debuted at the top of the Billboard New Age chart on November 12, 1994 and received a Grammy nomination for Best New Age Album the same year.

== Track listing ==
All tracks were written by Craig Chaquico and Ozzie Ahlers except for "Find Your Way Back" written by Craig Chaquico and Thomas Borsdorf.

No.	Title	Length
1.	"Native Tongue"	6:53
2.	"Winterflame"	5:13
3.	"Find Your Way Back"	5:18
4.	"Gathering of the Tribes"	6:57
5.	"The Greywolf Hunts Again"	4:36
6.	"Anejo de Cabo"	3:23
7.	"Just One World"	6:55
8.	"Center of Courage (E-Lizabeth's Song)"	3:30
9.	"Acoustic Planet"	7:39
Total length:		44:56
