= Garcia Live Volume Two =

Live album by Jerry Garcia Band
- Released: June 25, 2013
- Recorded: August 5, 1990
- Genre: Rock, rhythm and blues
- Length: 118:51
- Label: ATO

Jerry Garcia Band chronology
June 26, 1981, Warfield Theatre, San Francisco, CA (2013)	Garcia Live Volume Two (2013)	Fall 1989: The Long Island Sound (2013)

Jerry Garcia chronology
June 26, 1981, Warfield Theatre, San Francisco, CA (2013)	Garcia Live Volume Two (2013)	Live at the Boarding House: The Complete Shows (2013)

Garcia Live Volume Two is an album by the Jerry Garcia Band. It contains the complete concert recorded on August 5, 1990 at the Greek Theatre in Berkeley, California. It was released by ATO Records on June 25, 2013, in two formats – as a two-disc CD, and as a digital download.

The lineup of the Jerry Garcia Band for this concert – and for most of the band's shows from 1985 to 1995 – was Jerry Garcia on guitar and vocals, Melvin Seals on keyboards, John Kahn on bass, David Kemper on drums, and Jaclyn LaBranch and Gloria Jones on background vocals. Béla Fleck sat in on banjo for the first two songs of the second set.

Rosebud, one of Garcia's guitars, is depicted on the album cover.

Garcia Live Volume Two was released as a four-disc LP, in a limited edition of 4,000 copies, on November 27, 2020, in conjunction with Record Store Day Black Friday.

== Critical reception ==
Professional ratings
Review scores
Source	Rating
Allmusic	3.5/5 stars

On Allmusic, Fred Thomas said, "Though it was recorded a full decade after the first installment of this Dick's Picks-like concert archive series, Vol. 2 shares a lot of the same songs from the set list of Vol. 1.... though the feel of the set is far more jammy, summery, and laid-back than Vol. 1, which was bluesy and amped by relative Garcia standards. The protracted and stumbly vibe of the set presented here evokes the archetypal languid outdoor concert energy that the Grateful Dead all but defined in their endless touring, and Garcia's takes on roots rock classics by The Band, Van Morrison, and later-period Dylan help capture the stoned summertime musical snapshot all the more. What truly sets this volume apart from its predecessor is the guest spot by banjo virtuoso Béla Fleck on two songs..."

== Track listing ==
Disc 1

First set:

1. "How Sweet It Is (To Be Loved by You)" (Brian Holland, Lamont Dozier, Eddie Holland) – 7:33
2. "Stop That Train" (Peter Tosh) – 6:47
3. "Forever Young" (Bob Dylan) – 7:20
4. "Run for the Roses" (Jerry Garcia, Robert Hunter) – 5:50
5. "That's What Love Will Make You Do" (James Banks, Eddie Marion, Henderson Thigpen) – 8:06
6. "My Sisters and Brothers" (Charles Johnson) – 4:15
7. "Tears of Rage" (Richard Manuel, Dylan) – 8:16
8. "Deal" (Garcia, Hunter) – 8:34

Disc 2

Second set:

1. "Midnight Moonlight" (Peter Rowan) – 7:26
2. "The Harder They Come" (Jimmy Cliff) – 10:46
3. "And It Stoned Me" (Van Morrison) – 6:21
4. "Waiting for a Miracle" (Bruce Cockburn) – 6:43
5. "Evangeline" (David Hidalgo, Louie Pérez) – 4:22
6. "Think" (Jimmy McCracklin, Deadric Malone) – 7:01
7. "That Lucky Old Sun" (Beasley Smith, Haven Gillespie) – 8:22
8. "Tangled Up in Blue" (Dylan) – 11:19

== Personnel ==
Jerry Garcia Band

- Jerry Garcia – guitar, vocals
- Melvin Seals – keyboards
- John Kahn – bass
- David Kemper – drums
- Jaclyn LaBranch – vocals
- Gloria Jones – vocals

Additional musicians

- Béla Fleck – banjo on "Midnight Moonlight", "The Harder They Come"

Production

- Produced for release by Marc Allan, Joe Gastwirt
- Original recordings produced by Jerry Garcia
- Executive producer: Coran Capshaw
- Recording, engineering: John Cutler
- Mastering: Joe Gastwirt
- Art direction, design, illustration: Ryan Corey
- Photography: Susana Millman
