= Acoustic Highway =

Studio album by Craig Chaquico
- Released: 1993
- Studio: Lunatunes, Mill Valley, CA
- Genre: New age, smooth jazz, classic rock
- Length: 42:00
- Producer: Craig Chaquico, Ozzie Ahlers

Craig Chaquico chronology
Acoustic Highway (1993)	Acoustic Planet (1994)

Acoustic Highway is American musician Craig Chaquico's first solo album as a contemporary jazz artist after 16 years playing lead guitar, composing songs, and co-producing for the San Francisco-based rock bands Jefferson Starship and Starship. Acoustic Highway, co-written and co-produced by keyboardist Ozzie Ahlers, was released on June 11, 1993, through the Higher Octave label. The album was Billboard magazine's #1 Indie New Age Album of the year.

== Background ==
When Chaquico left Starship in 1990, he began looking for a new musical direction, opting for a solo career as a jazz and new age instrumentalist.

== Recording ==
The album was recorded at Chaquico's Lunatunes Studio in Mill Valley, California, mixed at Auravision Studios in Ojai, California, and mastered at Quad Tech Studios in Los Angeles.

== Music and lyrics ==
The album features nature-conscious songs such as "Return of the Eagle", "Mountain in the Mist", and "Land of the Giants". According to Mike Boehm, Chaquico produced "rippling, glistening, fluid tones" by processing his customized Washburn acoustic guitar through electronic effects. Chaquico includes elements that draw from new age, contemporary and smooth jazz compositions while containing subtle undertones of Native American influences. Chaquico's original recording of his jazz track "Sacred Ground" was included on the original Harley Davidson Road Song Collection in 1994, alongside classic rock songs such as "Born to Be Wild", "Rockin' Down the Highway" and a song by his former band, Jefferson Starship, "Ride the Tiger".

== Critical reception and accolades ==
Besides becoming Billboard magazine's #1 Indie New Age Album of the year, it also won the Bammie (Bay Area Music) Award for Best Independent Album of 1993. It charted in the top 10 of the GAVIN Adult Alternative chart in the same year.

== Track listing ==
All tracks were written by Craig Chaquico and Ozzie Ahlers.

No.	Title	Length
1.	"Mountain In The Mist"	4:36
2.	"Return Of The Eagle"	6:32
3.	"Gypsy Nights"	4:15
4.	"Angel Tears"	2:44
5.	"Acoustic Highway"	4:56
6.	"Sacred Ground"	6:51
7.	"Summers End"	4:51
8.	"Land Of The Giants"	4:47
9.	"Sunset Altar"	5:24
Total length:		44:56
