= Pure Jerry: Coliseum, Hampton, VA, November 9, 1991 =

Live album by Jerry Garcia Band
- Released: August 1, 2006
- Recorded: November 9, 1991
- Venue: Hampton Coliseum
- Genre: Rock, rhythm and blues
- Label: Jerry Made

Jerry Garcia Band chronology
Pure Jerry: Warner Theatre, March 18, 1978 (2005)	Pure Jerry: Coliseum, Hampton, VA, November 9, 1991 (2006)	Pure Jerry: Bay Area 1978 (2009)

Jerry Garcia chronology
Well-Matched: The Best of Merl Saunders & Jerry Garcia (2006)	Pure Jerry: Coliseum, Hampton, VA, November 9, 1991 (2006)	The Very Best of Jerry Garcia (2006)

Alternative cover
- Cover of the vinyl LP

Pure Jerry: Coliseum, Hampton, VA, November 9, 1991 is a two-CD live album by the Jerry Garcia Band. It contains the complete show recorded on November 9, 1991, at the Hampton Coliseum in Hampton, Virginia. The seventh in the Pure Jerry series of archival concert albums, it was released on August 1, 2006.

For this concert, the regular lineup of the Jerry Garcia Band was augmented by Bruce Hornsby, who sat in on electric piano for the entire show.

Pure Jerry: Coliseum, Hampton, VA, November 9, 1991 was released as a five-disc vinyl LP, with new cover art, on November 25, 2022.

== Recording ==
A statement on the back cover of the album says, "This package contains CDs compiled from two-track, soundboard tapes that are not to be mistaken for or confused with fully produced studio masters. For as much as any other purpose, these recordings are offered to honor the electrifying spiritual, social and historical aspects of the Jerry Garcia Band's concert of November 9, 1991. Enjoy this marvelous music with our assurance that every step has been taken to present it in a way that faithfully celebrates its original performance."

== Critical reception ==
Professional ratings
Review scores
Source	Rating
Allmusic	3.5/5 stars

On Allmusic, William Ruhlmann wrote, "... the Jerry Garcia Band (JGB) achieved its highest level of exposure in 1991. That August, Arista Records released the double live album Jerry Garcia Band, Garcia's first major label "solo" album in nine years. The JGB was a solo act in the sense that Garcia dominated it, but its musicians, organist Melvin Seals, bass player John Kahn, and drummer David Kemper, had been with him regularly for years, as had backup singers Gloria Jones and Jackie LaBranch. Within days of the concert commemorating the recently deceased Bill Graham at which he had played with the Dead, Garcia and the JGB embarked on a month-long tour of the East Coast and the Midwest in November.... the Virginia locale drew in a special guest, Bruce Hornsby on electric piano, who sat in for the entire show. Hornsby, of course, had been augmenting the Grateful Dead in this era, and he fit in equally well with the JGB... Hornsby's presence may be the reason this show was given a release, and that's fair, although there are other strong shows from this tour, which marked a peak period for the JGB."

On All About Jazz, Doug Collette wrote, "The effect Hornsby has on the musicians in the Jerry Garcia Band is much the same [as with the Grateful Dead], his effervescent playing imbuing the musicianship with a sparkling, fresh sense of rediscovery.... As with any band given to improvisation, however, the list of titles hardly tells the story of the performance. While there are no mammoth jams or extended segues of material a la Grateful Dead marathons, Garcia and Hornsby are mutual inspirations and ignite everyone else on stage too.... Such a legacy wouldn't matter much if the bulk of Garcia's musical enterprise did not support it, and Coliseum, Hampton VA, November 9, 1991 is definitely a high caliber entry into that canon. This despite its less than standard audio quality: pay attention to the disclaimer on the back cover, for it truly signals sound lacking the usual depth and clarity."

Jambands.com named Pure Jerry: Coliseum, Hampton, VA, November 9, 1991 as one of the best albums of 2006.

== Track listing ==
Disc 1

First set:

1. "How Sweet It Is (To Be Loved by You)" (Brian Holland, Lamont Dozier, Eddie Holland) – 7:37
2. "He Ain't Give You None" (Van Morrison) – 9:56
3. "You Never Can Tell" (Chuck Berry) – 9:16
4. "Run for the Roses" (Jerry Garcia, Robert Hunter) – 5:45
5. "The Night They Drove Old Dixie Down" (Robbie Robertson) – 10:48
6. "I Second That Emotion" (Smokey Robinson) – 9:46
7. "My Sisters and Brothers" (Charles Johnson) – 4:39
8. "Ain't No Bread in the Breadbox" (Norton Buffalo) – 9:15

Disc 2

Second set:

1. "Bright Side of the Road" (Morrison) – 8:01
2. "Shining Star" (Leo Graham, Paul Richmond) – 13:36
3. "Waiting for a Miracle" (Bruce Cockburn) – 7:01
4. "Think" (Jimmy McCracklin, Deadric Malone) – 9:41
5. "I Shall Be Released" (Bob Dylan) – 10:24
6. "Don't Let Go" (Jesse Stone) – 15:59
7. "Midnight Moonlight" (Peter Rowan) – 6:59

Encore:

8. "What a Wonderful World" (Bob Thiele, George David Weiss) – 8:04

== Personnel ==
=== Musicians ===
Jerry Garcia Band

- Jerry Garcia – guitar, vocals
- Melvin Seals – organ, keyboards
- John Kahn – bass
- David Kemper – drums
- Jaclyn LaBranch – vocals
- Gloria Jones – vocals

Additional musicians

- Bruce Hornsby – electric piano

=== Production ===
- Executive producer: Christopher Sabec, Peter McQuaid
- Recording: John Cutler
- Engineering, mastering: Joe Gastwirt
