= Pure Jerry: Marin Veterans Memorial Auditorium, San Rafael, California, February 28, 1986 =

Live album by Jerry Garcia and John Kahn
- Released: March 25, 2009
- Recorded: February 28, 1986
- Genre: Folk, Americana
- Label: Jerry Made
- Producer: John Cutler

Jerry Garcia chronology
| Live at the Boarding House (2008) | Pure Jerry: Marin Veterans Memorial Auditorium, San Rafael, California, February 28, 1986 (2009) | Pure Jerry: Bay Area 1978 (2009) |

Alternative cover
- LP cover

Pure Jerry: Marin Veterans Memorial Auditorium, San Rafael, California, February 28, 1986 is a live album by Jerry Garcia and John Kahn. As the title suggests, it was recorded at the Marin Veterans Memorial Auditorium in San Rafael, California, on February 28, 1986. It contains the entire concert from that date, on one CD. The eighth and penultimate entry in the Pure Jerry series of archival concert albums, it was released on March 25, 2009.

On this album, Garcia sings and plays acoustic guitar, accompanied only by Kahn on double bass. The songs include traditional folk and blues tunes, one Bob Dylan cover, and several selections from the Grateful Dead canon.

The album was released as a two-disc LP on November 24, 2023, as part of Record Store Day.

== Critical reception ==
Professional ratings
Review scores
| Source | Rating |
|---|---|
| Allmusic | 3.5/5 stars |
| The Music Box | 3.5/5 stars |
| The Best Of Website | B+ |

In the Marin Independent Journal, Paul Liberatore wrote, "This homecoming show was recorded in the 2,000-seat Marin Vets Auditorium at the end of a winter tour, the last of a dozen acoustic concerts Garcia and his close friend, bassist John Kahn, played together that year. This is the first official full release of acoustic music from Garcia and Kahn, and it's unfortunate that the bass sounds muddy and disconnected from the music when it's audible at all on this 70-minute recording. But Garcia's unmistakable guitar work and distinctive nasal voice come through loud and clear, particularly on folk tunes like 'Spike Driver Blues', once more reminding listeners of what an extraordinary musician he was. It takes a master to stand on a stage with just an acoustic guitar and a bass backup and be able to carry a show, enthralling an audience as only the charismatic Garcia could without ever saying a word to the crowd."

On All About Jazz, Doug Collette said, "Capturing two instruments and a single voice (Kahn doesn't sing at all) presents no great technical challenges, sonically speaking, but the recording of this February 1986 show, overseen by engineer John Cutler, not only catches the timbre of the instruments but the intimacy of the performance in the two thousand seat venue. Joe Gastwirt's mastering preserves the natural camaraderie of the two musicians in all its quiet glory as well."

On Allmusic, William Ruhlmann said, "It would be nice to be able to report that on what is the closest thing to a real solo album in Jerry Garcia's catalog, he took the opportunity to rethink and rearrange his music, but that's not the case here. Still, Garcia fans will welcome the unusually stripped down nature of the performance. It really is as close to 'pure Jerry' as they are likely to get."

In The Music Box, John Metzger wrote, "... of all the appearances that Garcia made with either the Grateful Dead or his many side projects, it’s hard to imagine that any of them conjured a mood that was more intimate than his excursions with Kahn in early 1986. Not surprisingly, the eighth chapter in the Pure Jerry series often assumes the air of a lo-fi demo recording, albeit one that boasts fully developed song structures and sparkling interplay between the two musicians."

On Jambands.com, Brian Robbins said, "A single disc, 12-song offering, Vol. 8 is just Jerry and his 6-string Takamine with longtime bass buddy John Kahn holding down the low end. The brief liner notes mention the distinct physical inconsistencies and associated technical challenges of the original masters, but the finished product is a fine one containing just enough warts, sweat, crowd noise, flubbed notes, and voice cracks to be real."

On The Best Of Website, Barry Small said, "This two man band line-up gives the listener a different feel of Jerry's guitar playing than in any other setting or personnel line-up with only the acoustic bass performing with him. Therefore, you can hear his rhythmic patterns and guitar riffs differently. It certain makes for a very, very good listen.... The flow of mixing the traditional material next to the Garcia/Hunter originals show how their writing style is perfectly in tune with the traditional American music. Hearing them side by side gives the listener true appreciation of this."

== Track listing ==
First set:

1. "Deep Elem Blues" (traditional) – 6:16
2. "Little Sadie" (traditional) – 4:50
3. "Friend of the Devil" (Jerry Garcia, John Dawson, Robert Hunter) – 6:19
4. "When I Paint My Masterpiece" (Bob Dylan) – 6:01
5. "Spike Driver Blues" (Mississippi John Hurt) – 4:57
6. "Run for the Roses" (Garcia, Hunter) – 4:51

Second set:

7. "Dire Wolf" (Garcia, Hunter) – 3:32
8. "Jack-a-Roe" (traditional) – 4:21
9. "Oh Babe, It Ain't No Lie" (Elizabeth Cotten) – 5:21
10. "Bird Song" (Garcia, Hunter) – 11:12
11. "Ripple" (Garcia, Hunter) – 3:58
12. "Goodnight Irene" (Huddie Ledbetter) – 7:41

== Personnel ==
=== Musicians ===
- Jerry Garcia – acoustic guitar, vocals
- John Kahn – acoustic bass

=== Production ===
- Produced by John Cutler
- Engineering, mastering: Joe Gastwirt
- Photography: Jay Blakesberg
