= Garcia Live Volume Four =

Live album by Jerry Garcia Band
- Released: July 8, 2014
- Recorded: March 22, 1978
- Genres: Rock, rhythm and blues
- Length: 124:36
- Label: ATO
- Producers: Marc Allan, Joe Gastwirt

Jerry Garcia Band chronology
Fall 1989: The Long Island Sound (2013)	Garcia Live Volume Four (2014)	Garcia Live Volume Five (2014)

Jerry Garcia chronology
Fall 1989: The Long Island Sound (2013)	Garcia Live Volume Four (2014)	Garcia Live Volume Five (2014)

Garcia Live Volume Four is a two-CD live album by the Jerry Garcia Band. It contains the complete concert recorded at Veteran's Hall in Sebastopol, California on March 22, 1978. It was released by ATO Records on July 8, 2014.

At the time of this recording, the members of the Jerry Garcia Band were Jerry Garcia on guitar and vocals, Keith Godchaux on keyboards, Donna Jean Godchaux and Maria Muldaur on vocals, John Kahn on bass, and Buzz Buchanan on drums. Keyboardist Ozzie Ahlers, who would later join the band full-time, makes a guest appearance at the Veteran's Hall show. Two other live albums recorded by this same lineup are Pure Jerry: Warner Theatre, March 18, 1978 and Pure Jerry: Bay Area 1978.

== Critical reception ==
Professional ratings
Review scores
Source	Rating
AllMusic	3.5/5 stars

On AllMusic, Fred Thomas said, "Vol. 4: March 22nd, 1978 finds Garcia and crew performing two remarkably laid-back sets at Veteran's Hall in Sebastopol, California, fresh off a short tour and just prior to the release of Cats Under the Stars, the only studio album that would fall under the Jerry Garcia Band banner. Garcia Live, Vol. 4 features a lineup of key contributors to the album in full-on live mode... Apart from running through original numbers from Cats Under the Stars such as the Robert Hunter-penned "Gomorrah" and a rare live rendition of "Love in the Afternoon", the band runs through a string of highly revamped covers, including some jammed-out takes on Motown and reggae and a particularly inspired version of gospel tune "I'll Be with Thee"."

== Track listing ==
Disc 1

First set:

1. "How Sweet It Is (To Be Loved by You)" (Brian Holland, Lamont Dozier, Eddie Holland) – 9:52
2. "Catfish John" (Bob McDill, Allen Reynolds) – 9:16
3. "Simple Twist of Fate" (Bob Dylan) – 10:54
4. "I Second That Emotion" (Al Cleveland, Smokey Robinson) – 10:29
5. "The Night They Drove Old Dixie Down" (Robbie Robertson) – 10:26

Disc 2

Second set:

1. "The Harder They Come" (Jimmy Cliff) – 12:12
2. "Mission in the Rain" (Jerry Garcia, Robert Hunter) – 11:21
3. "Cats Under the Stars" (Garcia, Hunter) – 8:04
4. "Gomorrah" (Garcia, Hunter) – 6:39
5. "Mystery Train" (Junior Parker, Sam Phillips) – 8:57
6. "Love in the Afternoon" (Hunter, John Kahn) – 10:11
7. "I'll Be with Thee" (traditional) – 5:16
8. "Midnight Moonlight" (Peter Rowan) – 10:59

== Personnel ==
Jerry Garcia Band

- Jerry Garcia – guitar, vocals
- Keith Godchaux – keyboards
- Donna Jean Godchaux – backing vocals
- Maria Muldaur – backing vocals
- John Kahn – bass
- Buzz Buchanan – drums

Additional musicians

- Ozzie Ahlers – keyboards on "Mystery Train", "Love in the Afternoon", "I'll Be with Thee", "Midnight Moonlight"

Production

- Produced for release by Marc Allan, Joe Gastwirt
- Original recordings produced by Jerry Garcia
- Executive producer: Coran Capshaw
- Associate producer: Kevin Monty
- Recording: Betty Cantor-Jackson
- Mastering: Joe Gastwirt
- Research associates: Evan Cooper, Hank Bateman
- Curators: Joe Gastwirt, Marc Allen
- Art direction, design, illustration: Ryan Corey
- Photography: James R. Anderson, Bill Fridl, Bob Minkin
