= Hampton Coliseum =

Multi-purpose arena in southeast Virginia

Coordinates: 37°2′5.01″N 76°22′52.82″W

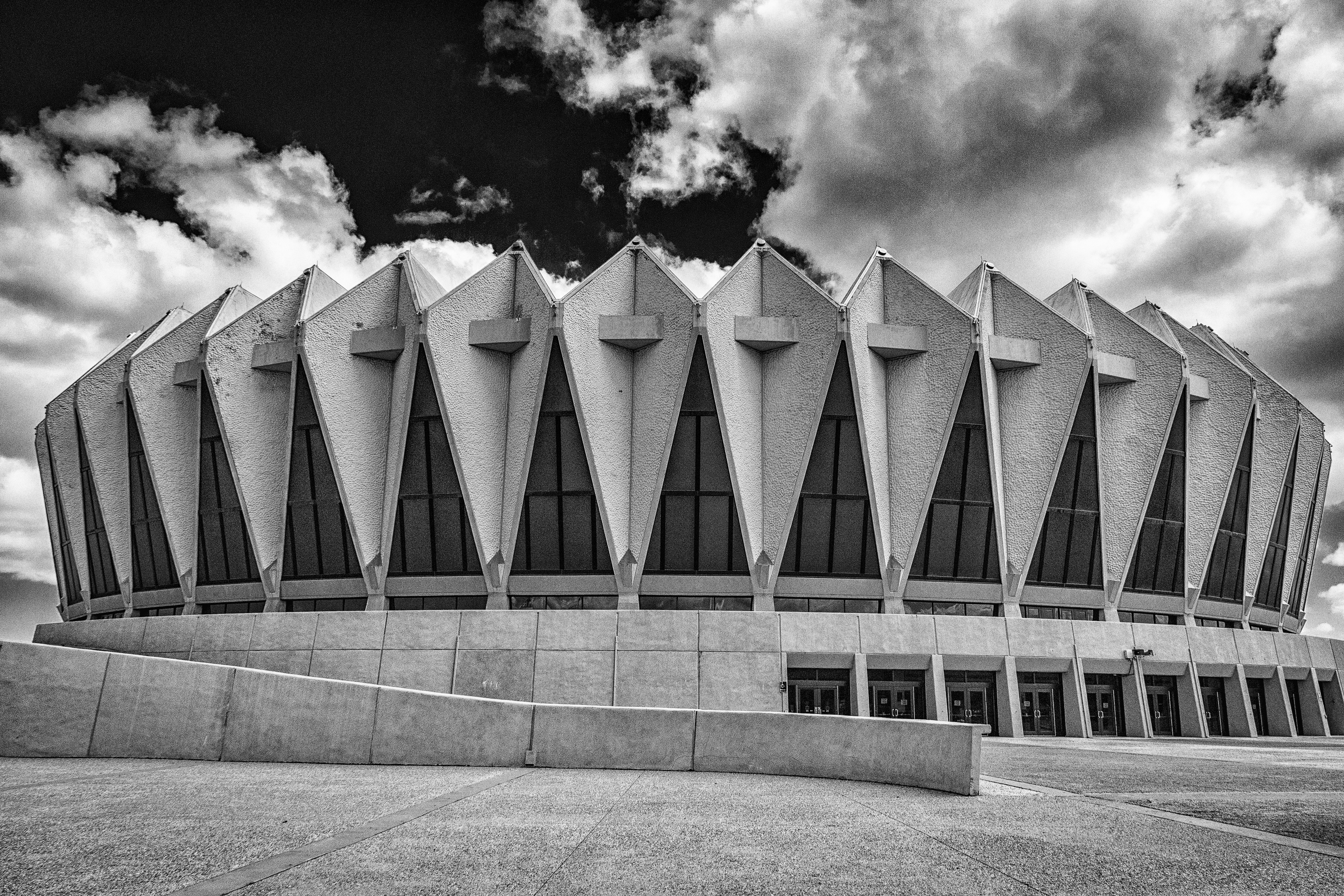
- The arena in 2014
- Interactive map of Hampton Coliseum
- Former names: Hampton Roads Coliseum (1969 - 1975)
- Address: 1000 Coliseum Drive; Hampton, Virginia; United States
- Owner: City of Hampton
- Operator: City of Hampton
- Capacity: 13,800 (concerts); 10,147 (basketball)

Construction
- Groundbreaking: May 24, 1968
- Built: 1968–1969
- Opened: December 1, 1969
- Cost: $8.5 to $9.0 million USD
- Architect: Odell Associates
- General contractors: McDevitt and Street Co.

Tenants
- Virginia Squires (ABA) (1970–76); Tidewater/Virginia Wings (AHL) (1971–75); Hampton Gulls (SHL/AHL) (1974–78); Hampton Aces (NEHL/EHL) (1978–81); Old Dominion Monarchs (NCAA) (part-time, 1970–95)

Hampton Coliseum is a multi-purpose arena in Hampton, Virginia. Construction began on May 24, 1968. The venue held its first event on December 1, 1969, with the nearby College of William & Mary playing North Carolina State University in a college men's basketball game. On January 31, 1970, the Coliseum formally opened as the first large multi-purpose arena in the Hampton Roads region and the state of Virginia (opening a year before the Norfolk Scope in Norfolk.)

With a final estimated cost between $8.5 million to $9 million, the arena was designed by Odell Associates and constructed by McDevitt and Street, of Charlotte, North Carolina. The venue capacity is configurable from 9,800 to 13,800 seats. Fans of the Grateful Dead and Phish have nicknamed the building The Mothership, a term coined by The Virginian-Pilot reporter John Colt in a 1981 Grateful Dead concert review.

== Sport ==
The arena at night in 2007

Hampton Coliseum was one of several former homes of the American Basketball Association Virginia Squires professional basketball franchise. The coliseum was also home to the Virginia Wings in the American Hockey League and Hampton Gulls in the Southern Hockey League and the Hampton Aces of the North Eastern Hockey League and Eastern Hockey League.

The coliseum hosted the Division I men's college basketball ECAC South Region tournament, organized by the Eastern College Athletic Conference (ECAC), in 1980 and 1981. The 1985 Sun Belt Conference Men's Basketball Tournament and the 1987, 1988, and 1989 Colonial Athletic Association Men's Basketball Tournaments were held in the coliseum. The Old Dominion Monarchs basketball team played occasional games in the coliseum from 1970 to 1995, usually one game a year, although twice the team played several games in the coliseum, in the 1979–80 and 1984–85 seasons. The Hampton Coliseum is the home of the Virginia Duals annual wrestling tournament, hosting invitational college and high school matches.

The National Wrestling Alliance, WCW, WWE and other wrestling promotions have run shows at the Coliseum since the 1980s.

The coliseum is most notable for the return of (in storyline kayfabe) WWE superstar CM Punk in July, 2011.

== Music ==
The Grateful Dead performed 21 concerts at Hampton Coliseum between 1979 and 1992, including two shows in 1989 under the billing of The Warlocks - the band's name before they changed it to the Grateful Dead. Unofficial tapes of these two shows proved extremely popular amongst Deadheads and the shows were later commercially released as Formerly the Warlocks. Garcia returned to the Coliseum with the Jerry Garcia Band for single shows in 1991 and 1993.

Elvis Presley performed 2 shows at the Coliseum in April 1972, another show in March 1974, and another 2 shows in August 1976. All shows were sold out. Performances from Presley's show on April 9, 1972, featured heavily in the 1972 Golden Globe winning documentary, Elvis on Tour, with Presley donning a powder blue jumpsuit.

Prince (musician) played the Coliseum on his Controversy Tour on March 11, 1982.

Madonna brought The Virgin Tour to the Coliseum on May 30, 1985.

Metallica performed at the Hampton Coliseum in 1986.

Beyoncé performed there on 2005 during the Verizon Ladies First Tour and 2007 during The Beyoncé Experience.

The venue remains popular with the rock band Phish, whose multi-night stand in 1998 was released as Hampton Comes Alive as well as choosing Hampton Coliseum as the site of their 2009 reunion shows. The band has performed at the venue 24 times between 1995 and 2025.

The world's first pay-per-view live broadcast of a rock show was held at the venue on December 18, 1981, when The Rolling Stones American Tour 1981 ended with a two-night stint. Guitarist Keith Richards memorably hit a man who ran onstage with his guitar.

Other performers include: The Who, Bon Jovi, Led Zeppelin, Van Halen, Iron Maiden, Pretty Lights, Pink Floyd, U2, Marvin Gaye, The Jacksons, Parliament-Funkadelic, Tina Turner, Bruce Springsteen, R.E.M., Dave Matthews Band, String Cheese Incident, Widespread Panic, Jerry Garcia Band, Pearl Jam, Griz, Kiss, Goose and Grateful Dead offshoots Furthur and The Other Ones.

== Notable recordings ==
The popularity of Hampton Coliseum among performers has led to the release of many notable live albums and tracks that were recorded at the venue.

- Rolling Stones – Hampton Coliseum 1981
- James Taylor – Live
- Phish – Hampton Comes Alive
- Phish – Hampton / Winston-Salem '97
- Grateful Dead – Live at Hampton Coliseum
- Grateful Dead – Formerly the Warlocks
- Jerry Garcia Band – Pure Jerry: Coliseum, Hampton, VA, November 9, 1991
- Metallica – Master of Puppets Remastered Deluxe Box Set / Disc 7 1986
- Led Zeppelin – Hampton Roads Coliseum 1971
- Elvis Presley – The Hampton Roads Concert
- Neil Diamond – Stages - Marry Me Live '96 (Disc 4/Track 16)
- Dave Matthews Band - Live Trax, Vol 7: Hampton Coliseum 12.31.96
