= Pure Jerry: Warner Theatre, March 18, 1978 =

Live album by Jerry Garcia Band
- Released: August 9, 2005
- Recorded: March 18, 1978
- Genres: Rock, rhythm and blues
- Length: 146:34
- Label: Jerry Made

Jerry Garcia Band chronology
Pure Jerry: Merriweather Post Pavilion, September 1 & 2, 1989 (2005)	Pure Jerry: Warner Theatre, March 18, 1978 (2005)	Pure Jerry: Coliseum, Hampton, VA, November 9, 1991 (2006)

Jerry Garcia chronology
Legion of Mary: The Jerry Garcia Collection, Vol. 1 (2005)	Pure Jerry: Warner Theatre, March 18, 1978 (2005)	Garcia Plays Dylan (2005)

Pure Jerry: Warner Theatre, March 18, 1978 is a two-CD live album by the Jerry Garcia Band. It contains two complete concerts – the early and late shows performed on March 18, 1978, at the Warner Theatre in Washington, D.C. The sixth in the Pure Jerry series of archival concert albums, it was released on August 9, 2005.

From November 1977 to November 1978, the lineup of the Jerry Garcia Band was the one featured on this recording — Jerry Garcia on guitar and vocals, Keith Godchaux on keyboards and vocals, Donna Jean Godchaux and Maria Muldaur on vocals, John Kahn on bass, and Buzz Buchanan on drums. Two other albums recorded by this same lineup are Pure Jerry: Bay Area 1978 and Garcia Live Volume Four.

== Critical reception ==
Professional ratings
Review scores
Source	Rating
Allmusic	4.5/5 stars
The Music Box	4/5 stars
The Best Of Website	B+

On Allmusic, Lindsay Planer said, "The JGB are hitting on all cylinders, as if this were Garcia's primary focus, rather than a side project. Perhaps one of the reasons they're so solid is that they were fresh from creating Cats Under the Stars... The sound quality is pristine, especially for tapes that were the better part of three decades old before being digitally restored. If not for the meticulous efforts of original on-location audio engineer Betty Cantor-Jackson — whose so-called 'Betty boards' are among the best live recordings of the era — archival anthologies like this one might not exist at all."

In The Music Box, John Metzger wrote, "Although there were moments during the concerts at the Warner Theatre when the ensemble struggled to find direction... the Jerry Garcia Band largely delivered a sturdy pair of sets. Despite the replacement of drummer Ron Tutt with relatively unknown percussionist Buzz Buchanan, the rhythm section was remarkably tight... Perhaps the most intriguing aspect of Pure Jerry: Warner Theatre, March 18, 1978, however, is the manner in which it thoroughly highlights Garcia's relationship with pianist Keith Godchaux. Indeed, within the open terrain of the Jerry Garcia Band's sonic structure, the duo had an abundance of opportunity to interact, and in employing the intuition of musicians who were extraordinarily fluent in jazz, they frequently spurred one another into carrying the music to new heights."

On The Best Of Website, Barry Small said, "Much of [Cats Under the Stars] is vocal oriented and some songs are light on the guitar. This material is perfectly suited for this two-backup-singer lineup. As a result, some of this material never sounded better live.... There is quite a bit of excellent music packed onto these two discs. Superb sound quality."

== Track listing ==
Disc one

Early show:

1. "I Second That Emotion" (Smokey Robinson, Al Cleveland) – 9:53
2. "They Love Each Other" (Jerry Garcia, Robert Hunter) – 7:24
3. "Knockin' on Heaven's Door" (Bob Dylan) – 11:02
4. "That's What Love Will Make You Do" (James Banks, Eddie Marion, Henderson Thigpen) – 10:31
5. "Love in the Afternoon" (John Kahn, Hunter) – 9:34
6. "Mystery Train" (Junior Parker, Sam Phillips) – 8:56

Late show:

7. "The Harder They Come" (Jimmy Cliff) – 12:35

Disc two

Late show, continued:

1. "Mission in the Rain" (Garcia, Hunter) – 11:25
2. "Simple Twist of Fate" (Dylan) – 9:17
3. "Midnight Moonlight" (Peter Rowan) – 11:17
4. "Gomorrah" (Garcia, Hunter) – 6:37
5. "Cats Under the Stars" (Garcia, Hunter) – 8:01
6. "I'll Be with Thee" (traditional) – 5:53
7. "Lonesome and a Long Way from Home" (Delaney Bramlett, Leon Russell) – 19:48
8. "Palm Sunday" (Garcia, Hunter) – 4:21

== Personnel ==
=== Jerry Garcia Band ===
- Jerry Garcia – guitar, vocals
- Keith Godchaux – electric piano, vocals
- Donna Jean Godchaux – vocals
- Maria Muldaur – vocals
- John Kahn – bass
- Buzz Buchanan – drums

=== Production ===
- Executive producers – Christopher Sabec, Peter McQuaid
- Recording – Betty Cantor-Jackson
- Engineering, mastering – Joe Gastwirt
- Tape research – David Lemieux
- Photography – Bob Minkin
