= June 26, 1981, Warfield Theatre, San Francisco, CA =

Live album by Jerry Garcia Band
- Released: April 1, 2013
- Recorded: June 26, 1981
- Genre: Rock, rhythm and blues
- Label: ATO

Jerry Garcia Band chronology
Garcia Live Volume One (2013)	June 26, 1981, Warfield Theatre, San Francisco, CA (2013)	Garcia Live Volume Two (2013)

Jerry Garcia chronology
Garcia Live Volume One (2013)	June 26, 1981, Warfield Theatre, San Francisco, CA (2013)	Garcia Live Volume Two (2013)

June 26, 1981, Warfield Theatre, San Francisco, CA is a live album by the Jerry Garcia Band. As the name suggests, it was recorded on June 26, 1981, at the Warfield in San Francisco. It was released as a digital download on April 1, 2013. Released after the first and before the second volume of the Garcia Live series of albums, it is sometimes referred to as Garcia Live Volume 1.5.

The album includes the complete second set from the concert. At this show, Phil Lesh substituted for the Garcia Band's usual bass player John Kahn.

== Track listing ==
1. "Mission in the Rain" (Jerry Garcia, Robert Hunter)
2. "The Harder They Come" (Jimmy Cliff)
3. "Knockin' on Heaven's Door" (Bob Dylan)
4. "Dear Prudence" (John Lennon, Paul McCartney)
5. "Midnight Moonlight" (Peter Rowan)

== Personnel ==
- Jerry Garcia – guitar, vocals
- Melvin Seals – keyboards
- Jimmy Warren – keyboards
- Phil Lesh – bass
- Daoud Shaw – drums
- Essra Mohawk – vocals
- Liz Stires – vocals
