= Fall 1989: The Long Island Sound =

2013 live album by the Jerry Garcia Band, Bob Weir and Rob Wasserman

Live album by Jerry Garcia Band and Bob Weir and Rob Wasserman
- Released: December 17, 2013
- Recorded: September 5–6, 1989
- Genre: Rock, rhythm and blues, folk rock
- Length: 340:32
- Label: ATO
- Producer: Marc Allan, Joe Gastwirt

Jerry Garcia Band chronology
| Garcia Live Volume Two (2013) | Fall 1989: The Long Island Sound (2013) | Garcia Live Volume Four (2014) |

Jerry Garcia chronology
| Glendale Train (2013) | Fall 1989: The Long Island Sound (2013) | Garcia Live Volume Four (2014) |

Bob Weir chronology
| Weir Here – The Best of Bob Weir (2004) | Fall 1989: The Long Island Sound (2013) | Blue Mountain (2016) |

Fall 1989: The Long Island Sound is a six-CD live album of performances by two musical acts – the Jerry Garcia Band, and Bob Weir and Rob Wasserman. It contains two complete concerts, recorded on September 5 and 6, 1989, at the Hartford Civic Center in Hartford, Connecticut and the Nassau Coliseum in Uniondale, New York. It was released by ATO Records on December 17, 2013.

Fall 1989: The Long Island Sound contains two complete concerts. At each of these shows, Bob Weir and Rob Wasserman played a set of acoustic music, followed by two electric sets by the Jerry Garcia Band, a rock group led by Jerry Garcia. At the time, Weir and Garcia were the guitarists for the Grateful Dead. Each of the discs of the album corresponds to one of the sets from the concerts.

== Critical reception ==
Professional ratings
Review scores
| Source | Rating |
|---|---|
| AllMusic | 4/5 stars |

On AllMusic, Tom Jurek said, "Taken together [the two concerts] provide irrefutable evidence of what fans already knew: that the JGB's flowering musical evolution peaked about this time, with the guitarist playing better than he had in years inside and outside the Grateful Dead.... The Garcia Band sets... are positively electric, crackling with energy and an obvious awareness among all players that what is transpiring is special.... The sound throughout is thoroughly remastered from soundboard tapes and is crystalline."

== Track listing ==
September 5, 1989 – Hartford Civic Center:

Disc one – Bob Weir and Rob Wasserman

1. "Festival" (Bob Weir) – 5:58
2. "Fever" (Eddie Cooley, John Davenport) – 4:11
3. "K.C. Moan" (Traditional, arranged by Weir and Rob Wasserman) – 3:45
4. "Desolation Row" (Bob Dylan) – 9:29
5. "Looks Like Rain" (Weir, John Barlow) – 8:08
6. "The Winners" (Weir, Rudyard Kipling) – 3:44
7. "Victim or the Crime" (Weir, Gerrit Graham) – 5:13
8. "Wasserman Bass Improvisation No. 1" (Wasserman) – 4:15
9. "Throwing Stones" (Weir, Barlow) – 8:17

Disc two – Jerry Garcia Band – first set

1. "Cats Under the Stars" (Jerry Garcia, Robert Hunter) – 9:09
2. "They Love Each Other (Garcia, Hunter) – 6:46
3. "Waiting for a Miracle" (Bruce Cockburn) – 6:49
4. "Run for the Roses" (Hunter, Garcia) – 5:34
5. "Like a Road" (Don Nix, Dan Penn) – 9:22
6. "My Sisters and Brothers" (Charles Johnson) – 4:34
7. "Deal" (Garcia, Hunter) – 10:22

Disc three – Jerry Garcia Band – second set

1. Tuning – 0:49
2. "The Harder They Come" (Jimmy Cliff) – 12:31
3. "Mission in the Rain" (Garcia, Hunter) – 10:02
4. "Forever Young" (Dylan) – 9:51
5. "Evangeline" (David Hidalgo, Louie Pérez) – 3:19
6. "Gomorrah" (Garcia, Hunter) – 6:39
7. "Don't Let Go" (Jesse Stone) – 13:55
8. "Lonesome and a Long Way from Home" (Delaney Bramlett, Leon Russell) – 6:04

September 6, 1989 – Nassau Coliseum:

Disc four – Bob Weir and Rob Wasserman

1. "Walking Blues" (Robert Johnson) – 4:48
2. "City Girls" (Weir, Graham) – 4:03
3. "Fever" (Cooley, Davenport) – 4:41
4. "Blackbird (John Lennon, Paul McCartney) – 2:47
5. "When I Paint My Masterpiece" (Dylan) – 4:46
6. "Shade of Grey" (Weir, Barlow) – 4:56
7. "The Winners" (Weir, Kipling) – 4:05
8. "Easy to Slip" (Lowell George, Martin Kibbee) – 6:44
9. "Wasserman Bass Improvisation No. 2" (Wasserman) – 3:33
10. "Heaven Help the Fool" (Weir, Barlow) – 6:44

Disc five – Jerry Garcia Band – first set

1. "How Sweet It Is (To Be Loved by You)" (Brian Holland, Lamont Dozier, Eddie Holland) – 7:02
2. "Stop That Train" (Peter Tosh) – 7:59
3. "That's What Love Will Make You Do" (James Banks, Eddie Marion, Henderson Thigpen) – 8:58
4. "Mississippi Moon" (Peter Rowan) – 8:39
5. "I Second That Emotion" (Smokey Robinson, Al Cleveland) – 8:46
6. "And It Stoned Me" (Van Morrison) – 6:43
7. "Deal" (Garcia, Hunter) – 8:53

Disc six – Jerry Garcia Band – second set

1. "The Harder They Come" (Cliff) – 11:26
2. "Dear Prudence" (Lennon, McCartney) – 10:37
3. "I Shall Be Released" (Dylan) – 7:42
4. "Let It Rock" (Chuck Berry) – 9:11
5. "Evangeline" (Hidalgo, Pérez) – 3:41
6. "That Lucky Old Sun" (Beasley Smith, Haven Gillespie) – 12:17
7. "Tangled Up in Blue" (Dylan) – 12:17

== Personnel ==
Bob Weir and Rob Wasserman

- Bob Weir – acoustic guitar, vocals
- Rob Wasserman – electric upright bass

Jerry Garcia Band

- Jerry Garcia – guitar, vocals
- Gloria Jones – vocals
- John Kahn – bass
- David Kemper – drums
- Jaclyn LaBranch – vocals
- Melvin Seals – organ

Production

- Produced for release by Marc Allan, Joe Gastwirt
- Original recordings produced by Jerry Garcia, Bob Weir
- Recording, engineering: John Cutler
- Additional production: Rob Wasserman
- Executive producer: Coran Capshaw
- Associate producer: Kevin Monty
- Album cover: Stanley Mouse
- Art direction, design, illustration: Ryan Corey
- Liner notes: Blair Jackson
