= Pure Jerry: Bay Area 1978 =

Live album by Jerry Garcia Band
- Released: August 31, 2009
- Recorded: February – June 1978
- Genres: Rock, rhythm and blues
- Label: Jerry Made

Jerry Garcia Band chronology
Pure Jerry: Coliseum, Hampton, VA, November 9, 1991 (2006)	Pure Jerry: Bay Area 1978 (2009)	Let It Rock: The Jerry Garcia Collection, Vol. 2 (2009)

Jerry Garcia chronology
Pure Jerry: Marin Veterans Memorial Auditorium, San Rafael, California, February 28, 1986 (2009)	Pure Jerry: Bay Area 1978 (2009)	Let It Rock: The Jerry Garcia Collection, Vol. 2 (2009)

Pure Jerry: Bay Area 1978 is a two-CD live album by the Jerry Garcia Band. It contains selections from four concerts performed in the San Francisco Bay Area in February and June 1978. The ninth and last entry in the Pure Jerry series of archival concert albums, it was released on August 31, 2009.

From November 1977 to November 1978, the lineup of the Jerry Garcia Band was the one featured on this recording — Jerry Garcia on guitar and vocals, Keith Godchaux on piano and vocals, Donna Jean Godchaux and Maria Muldaur on vocals, John Kahn on bass, and Buzz Buchanan on drums. Two other albums recorded by this same lineup are Pure Jerry: Warner Theatre, March 18, 1978 and Garcia Live Volume Four.

== Production ==
The concerts excerpted on Pure Jerry: Bay Area 1978 were recorded by Betty Cantor-Jackson.

In a 2009 interview, David Lemieux talked about the soon-to-be-released album. "... I had done some tape research a couple years ago on material that I amassed over the years, put it together as stuff, whether or not it's in the Vault or had been floating around as tape trader stuff, but wasn't complete shows. And that's what a lot of this material is. The complete shows are either unknown as far as tapes go and just taking bits and pieces that we all accumulated over the years and putting them together into... I don't know if you heard the Listening Party on the website, there's a couple tunes up there, "Mystery Train" and "The Way You Do the Things You Do", the music is phenomenal. It really is great stuff.... I'm just very happy this music is getting out. I remember hearing this "Lonesome and a Long Way from Home" years ago and being blown away by it. Just amazing. "Let Me Roll It" is just stunning. These are really choice pieces of music. It can truly be considered a great live album."

== Critical reception ==
Professional ratings
Review scores
Source	Rating
Allmusic	4/5 stars
The Music Box	4/5 stars

On Allmusic, Lindsay Planer said, "Even though Garcia continued a fruitful composing collaboration with Robert Hunter, the Jerry Garcia Band more often than not filled their live sets with covers blending rock, R&B, and even the occasional gospel number. For a solid two-and-a-half hours, listeners are treated to ample evidence of all these styles — often times combining with extraordinarily inventive results.... Potential consumers should be aware of the superior fidelity throughout Pure Jerry: Bay Area 1978 as the performances were documented by the audiophile-friendly Betty Cantor-Jackson."

In The Music Box, John Metzger wrote, "... the latest installment of the Pure Jerry series highlights the Jerry Garcia Band's loose, freewheeling approach, which allowed it to step on stage and expand five songs to fill a 70-minute time frame. To casual observers, this might appear to be excessively long-winded, but the music never seemed to stagnate because the group kept pushing it forward.... the most intriguing facet of Pure Jerry: Bay Area 1978 is, perhaps, the way in which material from four different shows was strung together to form a cohesive statement. Tremendous care was taken to present the music without the jarring transitions that often accompany these sorts of endeavors. The moods shift from track to track. Yet, they follow a path that is both natural and logical."

On All About Jazz, Doug Collette said, "... this double-disc composite of four 1978 shows makes a statement solely through the music. Everyone involved in the Jerry Garcia Band lineup, including its prestigious leader, sounds deeply immersed in the group camaraderie which, in turn, enhances the live experience for the audience and the performer.... The sources of the Pure Jerry archival series aren't always so pristine in audio quality as this one (the stellar likes of which Joe Gastwirt mastered), or the level of competence and enthusiasm in the musicianship so high, but this set accurately reflects the time in which it was recorded and the level of care it was afforded in preparation for release."

== Track listing ==
Disc 1

1. "Mystery Train" (Junior Parker, Sam Phillips) – 8:27 ^{[a]}
2. "Catfish John" (Bob McDill, Allen Reynolds) – 9:36 ^{[a]}
3. "I Second That Emotion" (Smokey Robinson, Al Cleveland) – 14:02 ^{[b]}
4. "Mission in the Rain" (Jerry Garcia, Robert Hunter) – 8:44 ^{[b]}
5. "Don't Let Go" (Jesse Stone) – 29:46 ^{[b]}

Disc 2

1. "Tore Up Over You" (Hank Ballard) – 9:04 ^{[c]}
2. "Simple Twist of Fate" (Bob Dylan) – 10:58 ^{[b]}
3. "The Way You Do the Things You Do" (Robinson, Bobby Rogers) – 10:17 ^{[b]}
4. "Let Me Roll It" (Paul McCartney) – 11:04 ^{[d]}
5. "Gomorrah" (Garcia, Hunter) – 6:26 ^{[d]}
6. "I'll Be with Thee" (traditional) – 5:37 ^{[d]}
7. "Lonesome and a Long Way from Home" (Delaney Bramlett, Leon Russell) – 23:56 ^{[a]}

Recording dates and locations:

[a] February 18, 1978 – Marin Veterans Memorial Auditorium, San Rafael, California
[b] February 19, 1978 – Santa Cruz Civic Auditorium, Santa Cruz, California
[c] June 10, 1978 – Keystone, Berkeley, California
[d] June 18, 1978 – Keystone, Palo Alto, California

== Personnel ==
=== Jerry Garcia Band ===
- Jerry Garcia – guitar, vocals
- Keith Godchaux – piano, vocals
- Donna Jean Godchaux – vocals
- Maria Muldaur – vocals
- John Kahn – bass
- Buzz Buchanan – drums

=== Production ===
- Compilation producer: David Lemieux
- Recording: Betty Cantor-Jackson
- Mastering: Joe Gastwirt
- Poster art: Randy Tuten
