= Let It Rock: The Jerry Garcia Collection, Vol. 2 =

Live album by Jerry Garcia Band
- Released: November 10, 2009
- Recorded: November 17 – 18, 1975; The Keystone; Berkeley, California
- Genre: Rock
- Label: Rhino

Jerry Garcia Band chronology
Pure Jerry: Bay Area 1978 (2009)	Let It Rock: The Jerry Garcia Collection, Vol. 2 (2009)	Garcia Live Volume One (2013)

Jerry Garcia chronology
Pure Jerry: Bay Area 1978 (2009)	Let It Rock: The Jerry Garcia Collection, Vol. 2 (2009)	Ragged but Right (2010)

Let It Rock: The Jerry Garcia Collection, Vol. 2 is an album by the Jerry Garcia Band. It was recorded live at the Keystone in Berkeley, California, on November 17 and 18, 1975. It was released by Rhino Records as a two-disc CD on November 10, 2009.

From 1975 to 1995, the Jerry Garcia Band was the main musical side project of Jerry Garcia of the Grateful Dead. The band underwent many personnel changes over the years. Let It Rock features the original lineup of the Jerry Garcia Band, which lasted from August through December 1975 — Garcia on guitar and vocals, Nicky Hopkins on piano, John Kahn on bass, and Ron Tutt on drums. Kahn and Tutt had also been members of Garcia's previous band, Legion of Mary. Hopkins was a highly regarded session musician who had played with the Beatles, the Rolling Stones, the Who, the Kinks, Jefferson Airplane, and Quicksilver Messenger Service.

== Critical reception ==
Professional ratings
Review scores
Source	Rating
Allmusic	4.5/5 stars
The Music Box	4/5 stars

In The Music Box, John Metzger wrote, "Throughout Let It Rock, each song is pushed, pulled, and stretched in all sorts of ways.... The trio of Hopkins-penned tunes... merely extends the sense that Garcia’s visits to Keystone Berkeley primarily provided an excuse for the musicians to get together and improvise on a theme. Yet, like many of his concerts, none of the tunes that Garcia tackled during these shows was ever burdened with mindlessly rambling sojourns. Instead, every note served a purpose, and each musician — Garcia and Hopkins in particular — fed ideas into the fray in order to see what his collaborators could do with them.... Let It Rock is densely packed with superb examples of the utmost musicianship, and it raises the possibilities of the places that this rendition of the Jerry Garcia Band could have gone, if only Hopkins hadn't been facing so many outside pressures."

In Relix, Rob Turner said, "The most recent chestnut from the Garcia archive is a spectacular recording from the very first configuration of the Jerry Garcia Band.... Hopkins' continuously restrained-yet-compelling piano embellishments seem to inspire Garcia to take a jazzier approach than he would with later incarnations of his band. He and Hopkins intermingle elegantly, letting the music waft to a gorgeous whisper during "Sitting in Limbo", and spurring each other to masterful improvisation at the back end of a soulful reading of "Let's Spend the Night Together".

JamBase wrote, "While it is not strictly speaking a complete show, The Jerry Garcia Collection, Vol 2 is sequenced to approximate a two-set club gig, highlighting performances recorded November 17 and 18, 1975, during a pair of intimate gigs at Keystone Berkeley in front of a hometown crowd. The shows demonstrate that this lineup was capable of collective improvisation on the same level as the Grateful Dead, says David Gans, host of The Grateful Dead Hour. 'Everybody could play melody or rhythm, or both, at any time, flying in and out of formation and always in intimate relation to what the others were playing,' he writes in the collection's liner notes."

== Track listing ==
=== Disc 1 ===
1. "Let It Rock" (Chuck Berry) – 13:25 ^{[b]}
2. "Tore Up over You" (Hank Ballard) – 6:54 ^{[b]}
3. "Friend of the Devil" (Jerry Garcia, John Dawson, Robert Hunter) – 6:30 ^{[a]}
4. "They Love Each Other" (Garcia, Hunter) – 7:18 ^{[b]}
5. "It's Too Late" (Chuck Willis) – 10:07 ^{[b]}
6. "Pig's Boogie" (Nicky Hopkins) – 10:36 ^{[b]}
7. Band introductions – :55 ^{[b]}
8. "Sitting in Limbo" (Jimmy Cliff, Guillermo Bright) – 12:00 ^{[b]}
9. "(I'm a) Road Runner" (Brian Holland, Lamont Dozier, Edward Holland Jr.) – 11:41 ^{[b]}

=== Disc 2 ===
1. "Sugaree" (Garcia, Hunter) – 11:46 ^{[b]}
2. "I'll Take a Melody" (Allen Toussaint) – 12:52 ^{[b]}
3. "That's What Love Will Make You Do" (Milton Campbell, Henderson Thigpen, James Banks, Eddy Marion) – 9:47 ^{[a]}
4. "Lady Sleeps" (Hopkins) – 5:15 ^{[a]}
5. "Ain't No Use" (traditional) – 11:56 ^{[b]}
6. "Let's Spend the Night Together" (Mick Jagger, Keith Richards) – 18:43 ^{[a]}
7. "Edward, the Mad Shirt Grinder" (Hopkins) – 9:05 ^{[b]}

Recording dates:

[a] November 17, 1975
[b] November 18, 1975

== Personnel ==
=== Jerry Garcia Band ===
- Jerry Garcia – guitar, vocals
- Nicky Hopkins – piano
- John Kahn – bass
- Ron Tutt – drums

=== Production ===
- Betty Cantor-Jackson – recording
- Jeffrey Norman – mixing and mastering
- David Gans – liner notes
- Steve Vance – design
- Craig Trexler – photography
