= Folk Time =

Studio album by the Hart Valley Drifters
- Released: November 11, 2016
- Recorded: Fall 1962
- Genre: Folk, bluegrass
- Length: 42:35
- Label: ATO
- Producer: Ted Claire, Marc Allan

Jerry Garcia chronology
| Garcia Live Volume Seven (2016) | Folk Time (2016) | Garcia Live Volume Eight (2017) |

Folk Time is an album by the Hart Valley Drifters, an American folk music band. It was recorded in 1962 at the studios of KZSU, a radio station at Stanford University. It was released by ATO Records on November 11, 2016.

The Hart Valley Drifters were part of the American folk music revival of the 1960s. The band included Jerry Garcia (who three years later would co-found the rock band the Grateful Dead), Robert Hunter (who would write the lyrics to many Grateful Dead songs), and David Nelson (who, with John Dawson and Garcia, would co-found the country rock band the New Riders of the Purple Sage).

== Critical reception ==
In American Songwriter, Hal Horowitz wrote, "The songs are mostly bluegrass standards from the catalogs of Ralph Stanley, Earl Scruggs and others played with youthful enthusiasm from the quintet. Garcia’s talent on banjo is displayed on "Roving Gambler", "Think of What You've Done", a caffeinated "Cripple Creek" and "Run Mountain", among others. He also takes lead vocals on most selections and while his signature approach was a ways off, he acquits himself admirably. There’s plenty of energy on display and the audio has held up remarkably well, especially considering the primitive college studio conditions it was recorded under."

In Relix, Jeff Tamarkin wrote, "Historical value aside, it's an exciting collection — Garcia was already a remarkably facile player and nuanced vocalist. His lead vocal on "Pig in a Pen", a trad number that would become a staple of his short-lived bluegrass side-project Old and In the Way a decade-plus later, contained all of the warmth and command he would fine-tune with more experience. And the picking, too, is superb: "Cripple Creek", an instrumental breakdown, barely lasts a minute and a half, but both Garcia's banjo and the guitar-playing are equal to that of any major folk festival habitués of the time."

On NPR, Felix Contreras said, "What you hear on Folk Time, besides pretty decent banjo playing, is the beginning of Garcia's quest to explore every aspect of what makes American music so rich.... [W]hat Garcia was really after – as a musical explorer in the Dead and other projects – was a seamless integration of this music, along with blues and jazz and folk, with just the right amount of psychedelic inspiration. With the rest of his Grateful Dead bandmates, he did exactly that – and that makes these songs the roots of a cultural phenomenon that recently celebrated 50 enlightening years of redefining improvised music."

On Pitchfork, Jesse Jarnow wrote, "Picking up the banjo after being discharged from the Army in 1960, Garcia immersed himself in folk music for a half-decade, practicing obsessively, working as a music teacher, and playing in a series of bands around the Palo Alto area, including the Thunder Mountain Tub Thumpers, the Black Mountain Boys, and others. Like many other central '60s musicians who would eventually plug in and freak out, Garcia came of musical age during the great folk scare, finding post-War solace in ancient (and ancient-seeming) songs. Only a few years from dashing headlong into the neon-pulsing present tense of LSD, Garcia and others first dove deep into a mythic past that seemed to come alive in the grooves of old records and zoetrope-like flicker between banjo rolls."

On jambands.com, Kristopher Weiss said, "Keeping in mind that this set was never intended as anything other than a one-off college radio broadcast and certainly never envisioned as a commercial release — particularly 54 years after the fact — Folk Time is remarkably solid. And given that it provides Deadheads a chance to hear Garcia as he's never been heard before and regular music lovers a glimpse of the Grateful Dead's roots, it stands as a critically important missing link to the vaunted San Francisco sound, folk, bluegrass and the catchall known as Americana."

On Grateful Web, Dylan Muhlberg said, "In 1962, Garcia wasn't the prodigious artist he would blossom into just yet. He was a folkie, obsessed with getting out and picking guitar and banjo while refining his amicable tenor vocals.... The 54-year-old recording has been vividly restored, entirely blemish free.... Before Bob Dylan had blown up, before John Hartford and Sam Bush created newgrass music, before the Nitty Gritty Dirt Band bridged rock and bluegrass, there was the Hart Valley Drifters. They aspired to play like their favorite pickers of the 1940s and 1950s."

== Track listing ==
1. Band introductions – 1:13
2. "Roving Gambler" (traditional) – 3:46
3. "Ground Speed" (Earl Scruggs) – 1:29
4. "Pig in a Pen" (Fiddlin' Arthur Smith, arranged by Jerry Garcia) – 2:16
5. "Standing in the Need of Prayer" (traditional) – 2:10
6. "Flint Hill Special" (Earl Scruggs) – 2:00
7. "Nine Pound Hammer" (traditional) – 2:42
8. "Handsome Molly" (G. B. Grayson, Henry Whitter) – 2:19
9. "Clinch Mountain Backstep" (Ralph Stanley, Ruby Rakes) – 1:18
10. "Think of What You've Done" (Carter Stanley) – 2:42
11. "Cripple Creek" (traditional) – 1:25
12. "All the Good Times Have Past and Gone" (traditional) – 3:09
13. "Billy Grimes, the Rover" (traditional) – 2:44
14. "Paddy on the Turnpike (Boys, My Money's All Gone)" (traditional) – 1:39
15. "Run Mountain" (J. E. Mainer) – 4:12
16. "Sugar Baby" (Dock Boggs) – 3:54
17. "Sitting on Top of the World" (Walter Vinson, Lonnie Carter) – 3:37

== Personnel ==
Hart Valley Drifters

- Jerry Garcia – banjo, guitar, lead vocals
- Ken Frankel – banjo, fiddle, guitar
- Robert Hunter – bass, backing vocals
- Norm Van Maastricht – Dobro
- David Nelson – guitar, backing vocals

Production

- Original recordings produced and engineered by Ted Claire
- Produced for release by Marc Allan
- Associate producers: Kevin Monty, Brian Miksis
- Mastering: Fred Kevorkian
- Art direction, illustration: Miles Tsang
- Photos: Jerald Melrose
- Liner notes essay "Everything That's Old Is New Again" written by Brian Miksis, edited by Dennis McNally
