= Garcia Live Volume Eight =

2017 live album by the Jerry Garcia Band

GarciaLive Volume Eight

Live album by Jerry Garcia Band
- Released: March 10, 2017
- Recorded: November 23, 1991
- Venue: Bradley Center, Milwaukee
- Genre: Rock, rhythm and blues
- Length: 132:02
- Label: Round / ATO
- Producer: Marc Allan, Kevin Monty

Jerry Garcia Band chronology
Garcia Live Volume Seven (2016)	GarciaLive Volume Eight (2017)	Garcia Live Volume 10 (2018)

Jerry Garcia chronology
Folk Time (2016)	GarciaLive Volume Eight (2017)	Garcia Live Volume Nine (2017)

GarciaLive Volume Eight is a two-disc live album by the Jerry Garcia Band. It contains the complete concert recorded on November 23, 1991, at the Bradley Center in Milwaukee, Wisconsin. It was released on March 10, 2017.

From February 1986 to November 1993, the lineup of the Jerry Garcia Band was Jerry Garcia (guitar, lead vocals), Melvin Seals (keyboards), John Kahn (bass), David Kemper (drums), Jaclyn LaBranch (backing vocals), and Gloria Jones (backing vocals).

== Critical reception ==
On AllMusic, Timothy Monger said, "The archival series GarciaLive offers up its eighth volume, this time highlighting a November 28, 1991 Jerry Garcia Band show at Milwaukee's Bradley Center, recorded during what is considered by many to be one of the band's finest tours. Wisconsinites at this show endured a massive snowstorm in order to hear [the band] blow through a breezy and spirited set of songs like "Cats Under the Stars", "My Sisters and Brothers", and a rousing take on the Manhattans' R&B classic "Shining Star"."

On Grateful Web, Dylan Muhlberg wrote: "1991 was a massive touring year for Garcia, who played one hundred and twelve shows total, including Grateful Dead, Garcia Band, and with David Grisman. Thirty-seven of those shows were with the Jerry Garcia Band, whose tight formation was intact since 1984.... By the time November 23rd rolled around, the Garcia Band had been on a hot tour... While much of Garcia Band's repertoire was covers, they were always heartfelt soulful arrangements. That night in Milwaukee, which was certainly Deadhead country, the band performed four originals penned by Robert Hunter."

== Track listing ==
Disc 1

First set:

1. "Cats Under the Stars" (Jerry Garcia, Robert Hunter) – 9:44
2. "They Love Each Other" (Garcia, Hunter) – 8:39
3. "Lay Down Sally" (Eric Clapton, Marcy Levy, George Terry) – 8:47
4. "The Night They Drove Old Dixie Down" (Robbie Robertson) – 10:46
5. "Reuben and Cherise" (Garcia, Hunter) – 8:41
6. "Money Honey" (Jesse Stone) – 6:44
7. "My Sisters and Brothers" (Charles Johnson) – 4:02
8. "Deal" (Garcia, Hunter) – 8:06

Disc 2

Second set:

1. "Bright Side of the Road" (Van Morrison) – 5:57
2. "Waiting for a Miracle" (Bruce Cockburn) – 6:23
3. "Think" (Jimmy McCracklin, Deadric Malone) – 7:48
4. "Shining Star" (Paul Richmond, Leo Graham) – 13:22
5. "Ain't No Bread in the Breadbox" (Norton Buffalo) – 9:34
6. "That Lucky Old Sun" (Haven Gillespie, Beasley Smith) – 12:03
7. "Tangled Up in Blue" (Bob Dylan) – 11:16

== Personnel ==
Jerry Garcia Band

- Jerry Garcia – guitar, vocals
- Gloria Jones – vocals
- John Kahn – bass
- David Kemper – drums
- Jaclyn LaBranch – vocals
- Melvin Seals – keyboards

Production

- Produced by Marc Allan, Kevin Monty
- Original recordings produced by Jerry Garcia
- Recording: John Cutler
- Mastering: Fred Kevorkian
- Curator: Kevin Monty
- Project coordinator: Lauren Goetzinger
- Art direction, design, illustration: Ryan Corey
- Liner notes essay: Dean Budnick
- Photos: Bob Minkin

== Charts ==
Chart (2017)	Peak position
US Billboard 200	96
