= Garcia Live Volume One =

Live album by Jerry Garcia Band
- Released: February 19, 2013
- Recorded: March 1, 1980
- Genre: Rock
- Length: 157:44
- Label: ATO
- Producer: Marc Allan, Joe Gastwirt

Jerry Garcia Band chronology
Let It Rock: The Jerry Garcia Collection, Vol. 2 (2009)	Garcia Live Volume One (2013)	June 26, 1981, Warfield Theatre, San Francisco, CA (2013)

Jerry Garcia chronology
Keystone Companions: The Complete 1973 Fantasy Recordings (2012)	Garcia Live Volume One (2013)	June 26, 1981, Warfield Theatre, San Francisco, CA (2013)

Garcia Live Volume One is an album by the Jerry Garcia Band. It contains the complete early show and late show performed on March 1, 1980, at the Capitol Theatre in Passaic, New Jersey. It was released on February 19, 2013, by ATO Records, in two formats – as a three-disc CD, and as a digital download. The album is the first of a series of archival concert releases called Garcia Live.

At the time of the Capitol Theatre concerts, the members of the Jerry Garcia Band were Jerry Garcia on guitar and vocals, Ozzie Ahlers on keyboards and vocals, John Kahn on bass, and Johnny de Foncesca on drums. At the late show, Robert Hunter sat in with the band on two songs that he wrote. The concerts were recorded using a 24-track mobile recording truck, and the early show was broadcast on WNEW-FM radio.

The cover of the album features a drawing of Tiger, one of Garcia's guitars.

Garcia Live Volume One was released as a five-disc vinyl LP in a limited edition of 5,000 copies on November 28, 2019, as part of Record Store Day Black Friday.

== Critical reception ==
Professional ratings
Review scores
Source	Rating
Allmusic	3.5/5 stars

On Allmusic, Fred Thomas wrote, "Recorded in 1980 at the Capitol Theatre in Passaic, New Jersey, the extensive set list includes only a few Garcia/Dead staples ('Deal', 'Sugaree'), but branches out into more eclectic territory with massively jammed-out versions of covers ranging from the Beatles to Jimmy Cliff. Grateful Dead lyricist Robert Hunter joins the band for an encore including 'Tiger Rose' and 'Promontory Rider'."

== Track listing ==
Disc 1

Early show:

1. "Sugaree" (Jerry Garcia, Robert Hunter) – 14:33
2. "Catfish John" (Bob McDill, Allen Reynolds) – 9:56
3. "How Sweet It Is (To Be Loved by You)" (Brian Holland, Lamont Dozier, Eddie Holland) – 9:05
4. "Simple Twist of Fate" (Bob Dylan) – 16:16

Disc 2

Early show continued:

1. "Sitting in Limbo" (Jimmy Cliff, Guillermo Bright-Plummer) – 12:40
2. "That's All Right" (Arthur Crudup) – 8:09
3. "Deal" (Garcia, Hunter) – 8:22

Late show:

4. "Mission in the Rain" (Garcia, Hunter) – 12:50
5. "That's What Love Will Make You Do" (Henderson Thigpen, James Banks, Eddy Marion) – 8:56

Disc 3

Late show continued:

1. "Russian Lullaby" (Irving Berlin) – 15:39
2. "The Harder They Come" (Cliff) – 11:47
3. "Tiger Rose" (Hunter) – 4:10
4. "Promontory Rider" (Hunter) – 6:10
5. "Midnight Moonlight" (Peter Rowan) – 8:39
6. "Dear Prudence" (John Lennon, Paul McCartney) – 10:22

== Personnel ==
=== Jerry Garcia Band ===
- Jerry Garcia – guitar, vocals
- Ozzie Ahlers – keyboards, vocals
- John Kahn – bass
- Johnny de Foncesca – drums

=== Additional musicians ===
- Robert Hunter – acoustic guitar, harmonica, vocals on "Tiger Rose", "Promontory Rider"

=== Production ===
- Produced for release by Marc Allan, Joe Gastwirt
- Original recordings produced by Jerry Garcia
- Executive producer: Coran Capshaw
- Mixing: Jeff Peters
- Mix assistant: Spencer Guerra
- Mastering: Joe Gastwirt
- Art direction, design, illustration: Ryan Corey
- Photography: Bob Minkin, Tom Dunning
- Liner notes: David Gans
