= Garcia Live Volume Five =

2014 live album by Jerry Garcia Band

Live album by Jerry Garcia Band
- Released: October 21, 2014
- Recorded: December 31, 1975
- Genres: Rock, rhythm and blues
- Length: 123:28
- Label: ATO
- Producers: Marc Allan; Joe Gastwirt

Jerry Garcia Band chronology
| Garcia Live Volume Four (2014) | Garcia Live Volume Five (2014) | On Broadway: Act One – October 28th, 1987 (2015) |

Jerry Garcia chronology
| Garcia Live Volume Four (2014) | Garcia Live Volume Five (2014) | On Broadway: Act One – October 28th, 1987 (2015) |

Garcia Live Volume Five is a two-CD live album by the Jerry Garcia Band. It contains the complete concert recorded at the Keystone in Berkeley, California on December 31, 1975. It was released by ATO Records on October 21, 2014.

The lineup of the Jerry Garcia Band for this concert was Jerry Garcia on guitar and vocals, Nicky Hopkins on keyboards, John Kahn on bass, and Greg Errico on drums. The show also featured performances by guest musicians Bob Weir, Mickey Hart, and Matthew Kelly.

== Recording and production ==
The back cover of Garcia Live Volume Five includes a notice which reads in part, "Originally captured to analog reels and later transferred to digital audio tape, the enclosed recordings have been meticulously mastered for release. While certain minor sonic imperfections impervious to even the latest in digital wizardry remain, rest assured this vibrant performance transcends any inherent limitation in fidelity."

== Critical reception ==
Professional ratings
Review scores
| Source | Rating |
|---|---|
| All About Jazz | 4/5 stars |
| AllMusic | 3/5 stars |

On AllMusic, Fred Thomas said, "A particularly loose, appropriately celebratory feeling flows through much of the sets as the band wanders through seemingly completely unrehearsed instrumental interludes... When they do get cooking, it's on extended 12-bar blues vamps in the first set like "It Ain't No Use" and "Pig's Boogie", while the second set tends toward laid-back jams like "Catfish John" or shuffling electric blues workouts like "Tore Up Over You". The band takes some time to truly get in a groove on this date, finally settling into some of the best material near the end of the recording."

In All About Jazz, Doug Collette wrote, "The fact of the matter is everyone in the group gets their own chance to shine, but these abbreviated solo intervals don't interrupt the seamless flow of the collective interaction.... Kudos to Betty Cantor-Jackson for capturing the goings-on with such clarity, but also to Joe Gastwirt who in both mastering and curating this archive title deserves his co-production credit.... It's no small accomplishment to do perfect justice to the towering figure that is Jerry Garcia, even if the content is as deceptively down-to-earth as December 31st, Keystone Berkeley."

== Track listing ==
Disc 1
First set:

1. "Let It Rock" (Chuck Berry) – 13:00
2. "Mother Nature's Son" (John Lennon, Paul McCartney) – 2:00
3. "It Ain't No Use" (Jerry Williams, Gary Bonds, Don Hollinger) – 11:36
4. "God Save the Queen" (traditional) – 0:48
5. "They Love Each Other" (Jerry Garcia, Robert Hunter) – 7:49
6. "Pig's Boogie" (Nicky Hopkins) – 10:41

Disc 2
Second set:

1. New Year's countdown – 1:51
2. "How Sweet It Is (To Be Loved by You)" (Brian Holland, Lamont Dozier, Eddie Holland) – 8:25
3. "Catfish John" (Bob McDill, Allen Reynolds) – 15:29
4. "Mystery Train" (Junior Parker, Sam Phillips) – 7:08
5. "Drums" -> "New Year's Jam" (Garcia, John Kahn, Hopkins, Greg Errico, Bob Weir, Matthew Kelly, Mickey Hart) – 13:14
6. "Mystery Train" (Parker, Phillips) – 1:48

Third set:

7. "Tore Up over You" (Hank Ballard) – 10:46
8. Tuning – 0:48
9. "C.C. Rider" (traditional) – 8:20
10. "(I'm a) Road Runner" (Holland, Dozier, Holland) – 9:43

== Personnel ==
Jerry Garcia Band

- Jerry Garcia – guitar, vocals
- Nicky Hopkins – keyboards, vocals
- John Kahn – bass
- Greg Errico – drums

Additional musicians

- Matthew Kelly – harmonica, guitar ("It Ain't No Use", "They Love Each Other", "Pig's Boogie", second and third sets)
- Mickey Hart – drums (second and third sets)
- Bob Weir – guitar, vocals (second and third sets)

Production

- Produced for release by Marc Allan, Joe Gastwirt
- Original recordings produced by Jerry Garcia
- Associate producer: Kevin Monty
- Recording: Betty Cantor-Jackson
- Mastering: Joe Gastwirt
- Liner notes essay: David Gans
- Art direction, design, illustration: Ryan Corey
- Photography: Ed Perlstein, Bob Minkin
