= Garcia Live Volume Seven =

Live album by Jerry Garcia Band
- Released: August 19, 2016
- Recorded: November 8, 1976
- Venue: Sophie's, Palo Alto, California
- Genre: Rock, rhythm and blues
- Length: 149:39
- Label: Round / ATO

Jerry Garcia Band chronology
On Broadway: Act One – October 28th, 1987 (2015)	Garcia Live Volume Seven (2016)	Garcia Live Volume Eight (2017)

Jerry Garcia chronology
Garcia Live Volume Six (2016)	GarciaLive Volume Seven (2016)	Folk Time (2016)

Garcia Live Volume Seven is a two-disc live album by the Jerry Garcia Band. It contains the complete concert recorded on November 8, 1976 at Sophie's in Palo Alto, California. It was released on August 19, 2016.

From January 1976 to August 1977 the members of the Jerry Garcia Band were Jerry Garcia on guitar and vocals, Keith Godchaux on keyboards, Donna Jean Godchaux on vocals, John Kahn on bass, and Ron Tutt on drums.

== Provenance ==
The master recording of the November 8, 1976 concert was recovered by Donna Jean Godchaux. While moving in 2015, she found the reel-to-reel tapes in a box in her possession.

In a 2016 interview, Donna Jean talked about being in the Jerry Garcia Band. "It was very different from the Grateful Dead in that everything was so scaled back to where we could play theaters instead of hockey rinks. It was very enjoyable on that level because these places were built for music to be played in. It was just a really unique situation to be as popular as Jerry Garcia was and still be able to be in a band that could do what we did in a smaller setting than the Grateful Dead. It was kind of like a home away from home for Jerry, in that he got this different expression of what he was feeling musically than the Grateful Dead."

== Critical reception ==
On AllMusic, Timothy Monger wrote, "Mixing their mid-'70s cocktail of rock, soul, gospel, and reggae, the JGB runs through spirited versions of "The Way You Do the Things You Do", "Mission in the Rain", "Knockin' on Heaven's Door", and a 22-minute rendition of "Don't Let Go"."

On All About Jazz, Doug Collette wrote, "The openness and vulnerability within Jerry Garcia's singing voice is an often-overlooked virtue among all the others for which he's distinguished, including his ever-so-precise (acoustic and electric) guitar playing as well as his songwriting collaborations with lyricist Robert Hunter. Nevertheless, those vocal qualities also resonate in the best of his solo work and Garcia Live Volume Seven is a prime example."

On Grateful Web, Dylan Muhlberg said, "The band had transitioned away from the horn-accompanied rave-ups of the Merl Saunders accompanied years to a refined multifarious ode of Garcia's many musical muses. Motown, soul, rhythm and blues, gospel, jazz, disco; basically anything that Garcia felt more confident developing away from the instrumentation of his other band. With his own band, Jerry felt free taking his favorite tunes to elaborately explore, lengthen, and jam."

== Track listing ==
Disc 1
First set:

1. "The Way You Do the Things You Do" (Smokey Robinson, Bobby Rogers) – 9:00
2. "Knockin' on Heaven's Door" (Bob Dylan) – 14:14
3. "After Midnight" (J. J. Cale) – 13:50
4. "Who Was John?" (traditional) – 14:28
5. "Mission in the Rain" (Jerry Garcia, Robert Hunter) – 8:20
6. "Stir It Up" (Bob Marley) – 12:21

Disc 2

1. "Midnight Moonlight" (Peter Rowan) – 9:25

Second set:

2. "Tore Up over You" (Hank Ballard) – 10:43
3. "Friend of the Devil" (John Dawson, Garcia, Hunter) – 7:54
4. "Don't Let Go" (Jesse Stone) – 22:23
5. "Strange Man" (Dorothy Love Coates) – 6:10
6. "Stop That Train" (Peter Tosh) – 11:44
7. "Ride Mighty High" (Dave Crawford, Richard Downing) – 9:02

== Personnel ==
Jerry Garcia Band

- Jerry Garcia – guitar, vocals
- Donna Jean Godchaux – vocals
- Keith Godchaux – keyboards
- John Kahn – bass
- Ron Tutt – drums

Production

- Original recordings produced by Jerry Garcia
- Recording: Betty Cantor-Jackson
- Mastering: Fred Kevorkian
- Art direction, design, illustration: Ryan Corey
- Photos: Ed Perlstein, James Anderson
- Associate producer: Kevin Monty
- Curator: Marc Allan, Kevin Monty
- Project coordinator: Lauren Goetzinger, Robby Saady
- Liner notes essay "Little Keys to Big Doors" written by Nicholas Meriwether

== Charts ==
Chart (2016)	Peak position
US Billboard 200	193
