= Jerry Garcia Band =

American musical group (1975–1995)

- A 1984 live performance by the Jerry Garcia Band

Background information
- Origin: Marin County, California, USA
- Genres: Rock; jam rock
- Years active: 1975–1995
- Labels: Arista; Grateful Dead
- Spinoffs: Legion of Mary; Jerry Garcia Acoustic Band; JGB
- Spinoff of: Grateful Dead
- Past members: Jerry Garcia; John Kahn; Ron Tutt; Nicky Hopkins; James Booker; Keith Godchaux; Donna Godchaux; Maria Muldaur; Buzz Buchanan; Ozzie Ahlers; Johnny D’Fonseca; Greg Errico; Melvin Seals; Jimmy Warren; Daoud Shaw; Essra Mohawk; Liz Stires; Bill Kreutzmann; Jaclyn LaBranch; DeeDee Dickerson; David Kemper; Gloria Jones; Gaylord Birch; Donny Baldwin
- Website: jerrygarcia.com

The Jerry Garcia Band was a San Francisco Bay Area rock band led by Jerry Garcia of the Grateful Dead. Garcia founded the band in 1975; it remained the most important of his various side projects until his death in 1995. The band regularly toured and recorded sporadically throughout its twenty-year existence, generally, but not always, during breaks in the Grateful Dead's schedule.

== History ==
Although the name Jerry Garcia Band only properly applies from late January 1976, this Garcia side-band's actual history and repertoire really began with local club gigs in 1970 featuring Garcia, Merl Saunders, John Kahn and various others, including Tom Fogerty on rhythm guitar (1971–72), Martin Fierro on tenor sax and flute (1974–75), and briefly (October–December 1975) Nicky Hopkins on piano, as well as drummers Bill Kreutzmann, Bill Vitt, Gaylord Birch, and Paul Humphrey. Garcia and Kahn met in 1970 playing together at Monday jam sessions hosted by Howard Wales at the small San Francisco club, the Matrix.

Over the years, the lineup of the Jerry Garcia Band changed many times. The one constant member besides Garcia himself was bassist John Kahn, who served as Garcia's principal musical collaborator outside of the Grateful Dead after 1970. Melvin Seals had the next longest tenure, serving as keyboardist from 1981 onward.

Jerry Garcia's musical interests were famously varied, and this was reflected in the diverse music played by his band. Like the Grateful Dead, the Jerry Garcia Band played rock music that was influenced by blues, folk, country, and jazz in an improvisatory milieu that largely served as a framework for Garcia's solos. However, the group eschewed the former band's avant-garde and world music influences in favor of a slower, groove-based "bar band" approach strongly oriented toward rhythm and blues (the band often featured female backing vocalists characteristic of the genre), gospel music and reggae. Rock versions of contemporary Americana were also prominent. The relatively languorous tempos were dictated by Garcia and Kahn, much to the chagrin of longtime drummer David Kemper: "[I]t bothered me from the very beginning. I’d say, ‘You know we need some uptempo material, it’s just putting me to sleep; the band is putting me to sleep.’ At first I'd say these things, and then I just decided to go with it. It is what it is, and who was I to say anything? This band preceded me; the whole concept of the band preceded me."

Staples of the band's repertoire included Holland–Dozier–Holland's "How Sweet It Is (To Be Loved by You)" (widely perceived as the group's signature song and their most-performed song), Peter Rowan's "Midnight Moonlight", Jimmy Cliff's "The Harder They Come" and "Sitting in Limbo", the Sensational Nightingales' "My Sisters and Brothers", Hank Ballard's "Tore Up Over You", Bob McDill and Allen Reynolds' "Catfish John", John Lennon's "Dear Prudence", Jesse Stone's "Don't Let Go", Allen Toussaint's "I'll Take a Melody" and "Get Out of My Life, Woman", Little Milton's "That's What Love Will Make You Do", Chuck Berry's "Let It Rock" and "You Never Can Tell", Bruce Cockburn's "Waiting for a Miracle", Irving Berlin's "Russian Lullaby", Smokey Robinson's "The Way You Do the Things You Do" and "I Second That Emotion", Peter Tosh's "Stop That Train", Bob Marley's "Stir It Up", Robbie Robertson's "The Night They Drove Old Dixie Down", the Manhattans' "Shining Star", Van Morrison's "And It Stoned Me" and "Bright Side of the Road" and Norton Buffalo's "Ain't No Bread in the Breadbox". The band also performed Jerome Kern and Oscar Hammerstein II's "Ol' Man River" and Miles Davis' "So What" on one occasion apiece. As with the Grateful Dead, Jerry Garcia regularly covered many songs by Bob Dylan with the group, including "Tangled Up in Blue", "Simple Twist of Fate", "Knockin' on Heaven's Door", "Forever Young", "Señor (Tales of Yankee Power)", "Tears of Rage", "I Shall Be Released", "Tough Mama", and "When I Paint My Masterpiece".

The group did not perform between November 1978 and October 1979; during that year, Garcia, Kahn and keyboardist Merl Saunders (who performed with Garcia and Kahn from 1971 to 1975 in the Saunders/Garcia Band and Legion of Mary) briefly performed in Reconstruction, a more egalitarian jazz-funk ensemble.

According to Linda Kahn in a 2017 Reddit Ask Me Anything prompt, much of the band's repertoire was curated by her husband: "[H]e did bring most of the cover material to the table. He has a big record collection and they're all in really good shape, he was pretty anal about his records. I think as far as picking songs, he listened to records all the time, so it depends on whoever was in the band and whatever group was playing at the time and that influenced John a lot."

Although the repertoire was strongly tilted toward covers, several Garcia-Robert Hunter originals (including "Run for the Roses", "Mission in the Rain", "Gomorrah", "Cats Under the Stars", and "Reuben and Cherise") were performed exclusively or near-exclusively by the Jerry Garcia Band. Some of the band's original repertoire (most notably "Deal", "They Love Each Other", "Sugaree", and "Friend of the Devil") was shared with the Grateful Dead.

During Garcia's lifetime, the Jerry Garcia Band released one studio album, Cats Under the Stars, and one live album, Jerry Garcia Band. A number of additional live albums were released posthumously.

The group was an indirect beneficiary of the commercial success of the Grateful Dead's In the Dark (1987); as the latter group transitioned to summer stadium tours and multi-night arena engagements during their autumn and spring tours, the tour itineraries of the Garcia Band (hitherto confined to clubs and small theaters) came to encompass arenas (primarily in Garcia's key northeastern United States market) and outdoor amphitheaters favored by the Grateful Dead in the early 1980s. During this period, the group continued to play as many as fifteen concerts a year in an informal residency at The Warfield, a 2,300-capacity theater in San Francisco. Clarence Clemons also guested with them on tour for a brief time in 1989 and 1990.

Kahn briefly led the group (rechristened JGB) following Garcia's death in 1995. Seals became the bandleader after Kahn's death in 1996; as of 2017, he is the only remaining member from the final iteration of the Jerry Garcia Band in JGB.

== Personnel ==
Following are the lineups for the Jerry Garcia Band's live performances.

August 5 – December 31, 1975	Jerry Garcia – guitar, vocals; John Kahn – bass; Nicky Hopkins – piano, vocals; Ron Tutt – drums
January 9–10, 1976	Jerry Garcia – guitar, vocals; John Kahn – bass; James Booker – piano, vocals; Ron Tutt – drums
January 26, 1976 – August 12, 1977	Jerry Garcia – guitar, vocals; John Kahn – bass; Keith Godchaux – piano, vocals; Donna Godchaux – vocals; Ron Tutt – drums
November 15, 1977 – November 3, 1978	Jerry Garcia – guitar, vocals; John Kahn – bass; Keith Godchaux – piano, vocals; Donna Godchaux – vocals; Maria Muldaur – vocals; Buzz Buchanan – drums
October 7, 1979 – March 27, 1980	Jerry Garcia – guitar, vocals; John Kahn – bass; Ozzie Ahlers – keyboards, vocals; Johnny d'Fonseca – drums
July 18– November 16, 1980	Jerry Garcia – guitar, vocals; John Kahn – bass; Ozzie Ahlers – keyboards, vocals; Greg Errico – drums
December 20, 1980 – June 1, 1981	Jerry Garcia – guitar, vocals; John Kahn – bass; Melvin Seals – organ; Jimmy Warren – electric piano, clavinet; Daoud Shaw – drums
June 25 – August 23, 1981	Jerry Garcia – guitar, vocals; John Kahn – bass; Melvin Seals – organ; Jimmy Warren – electric piano, clavinet; Bill Kreutzmann – drums; Essra Mohawk – vocals; Liz Stires – vocals
September 7, 1981	Jerry Garcia – guitar, vocals; John Kahn – bass; Melvin Seals – organ; Jimmy Warren – electric piano, clavinet; Bill Kreutzmann – drums; Julie Stafford – vocals; Liz Stires – vocals
September 18 – November 20, 1981	Jerry Garcia – guitar, vocals; John Kahn – bass; Melvin Seals – organ; Jimmy Warren – electric piano, clavinet; Ron Tutt – drums; Julie Stafford – vocals; Liz Stires – vocals
December 17, 1981 – June 24, 1982	Jerry Garcia – guitar, vocals; John Kahn – bass; Melvin Seals – organ; Jimmy Warren – electric piano, clavinet; Bill Kreutzmann – drums; Julie Stafford – vocals; Liz Stires – vocals
October 13 – 23, 1982	Jerry Garcia – guitar, vocals; John Kahn – bass; Melvin Seals – organ; Greg Errico – drums
October 24, 1982 – June 5, 1983	Jerry Garcia – guitar, vocals; John Kahn – bass; Melvin Seals – organ; Greg Errico – drums; Jaclyn LaBranch – vocals; DeeDee Dickerson – vocals
July 20, 1983 – August 28, 1984	Jerry Garcia – guitar, vocals; John Kahn – bass; Melvin Seals – organ; David Kemper – drums; Jaclyn LaBranch – vocals; DeeDee Dickerson – vocals
September 15, 1984 – September 28, 1985	Jerry Garcia – guitar, vocals; John Kahn – bass; Melvin Seals – organ; David Kemper – drums; Jaclyn LaBranch – vocals; Gloria Jones – vocals
October 7, 1985 – February 2, 1986	Jerry Garcia – guitar, vocals; John Kahn – bass; Melvin Seals – organ; Gaylord Birch – drums; Jaclyn LaBranch – vocals; Gloria Jones – vocals
February 21, 1986 – November 19, 1993	Jerry Garcia – guitar, vocals; John Kahn – bass; Melvin Seals – organ; David Kemper – drums; Jaclyn LaBranch – vocals; Gloria Jones – vocals
February 4, 1994 – April 23, 1995	Jerry Garcia – guitar, vocals; John Kahn – bass; Melvin Seals – organ; Donny Baldwin – drums; Jaclyn LaBranch – vocals; Gloria Jones – vocals

=== Timeline ===
This timeline shows musicians who played in the Jerry Garcia Band, as well as those who played in prior groups led or co-led by Jerry Garcia.

== Discography ==
Title	Year	Recording date(s)	Notes
Cats Under the Stars	1978		Studio album
Jerry Garcia Band	1991	April–August 1990	
How Sweet It Is	1997	April–August 1990	
Don't Let Go	2001	May 21, 1976	
Shining Star	2001	1989–1993	
Pure Jerry: Theatre 1839, San Francisco, July 29 & 30, 1977	2004	July 29 – 30, 1977	
After Midnight: Kean College, 2/28/80	2004	February 28, 1980	
Pure Jerry: Lunt-Fontanne, New York City, October 31, 1987	2004	October 31, 1987	
Pure Jerry: Lunt-Fontanne, New York City, The Best of the Rest, October 15–30, 1987	2004	October 15–30, 1987	
Pure Jerry: Merriweather Post Pavilion, September 1 & 2, 1989	2005	September 1–2, 1989	
Pure Jerry: Warner Theatre, March 18, 1978	2005	March 18, 1978	
Garcia Plays Dylan	2005		(Compilation album with some tracks by the Jerry Garcia Band)
Pure Jerry: Coliseum, Hampton, VA, November 9, 1991	2006	November 9, 1991	
Pure Jerry: Bay Area 1978	2009	February – June 1978	
Let It Rock: The Jerry Garcia Collection, Vol. 2	2009	November 17 – 18, 1975	
Garcia Live Volume One	2013	March 1, 1980	
June 26, 1981, Warfield Theatre, San Francisco, CA	2013	June 26, 1981	
Garcia Live Volume Two	2013	August 5, 1990	
Fall 1989: The Long Island Sound	2013	September 5–6, 1989	(Jerry Garcia Band and Bob Weir & Rob Wasserman)
Garcia Live Volume Four	2014	March 22, 1978	
Garcia Live Volume Five	2014	December 31, 1975	
On Broadway: Act One – October 28th, 1987	2015	October 28, 1987	(Jerry Garcia Band and Jerry Garcia Acoustic Band)
Garcia Live Volume Seven	2016	November 8, 1976	
Garcia Live Volume Eight	2017	November 23, 1991	
Garcia Live Volume 10	2018	May 20, 1990	
Electric on the Eel	2019	1987, 1989, 1991	
Garcia Live Volume 11	2019	November 11, 1993	
Garcia Live Volume 13	2020	September 16, 1989	
Garcia Live Volume 16	2021	November 15, 1991	
Garcia Live Volume 17	2021	November 7 – 13, 1976	
Garcia Live Volume 19	2022	October 31, 1992	
Garcia Live Volume 20	2023	June 18, 1982	
Garcia Live Volume 21	2024	February 13, 1976	
Live at the Warfield	2025	February 28 – March 2, 1991	
Garcia Live Volume 23	2026	August 14, 1993	

== See also ==
- JGB Band
