= Ozzie Ahlers =

American songwriter and music producer

Background information
- Born: David Ozzie Ahlers; June 3, 1946 (age 79); Summit, New Jersey, United States
- Genres: Rock, reggae, new-age, smooth jazz, film soundtracks
- Occupation(s): Instrumentalist, songwriter, music producer, film composer
- Instrument(s): Keyboards, guitar, bass
- Years active: 1968–present
- Labels: Higher Octave Music, Virgin Records, Narada Records
- Formerly of: Jerry Garcia Band

Ozzie Ahlers (born June 3, 1946, in Summit, New Jersey) is an American songwriter and music producer who plays the keyboard, guitar, and bass. In addition to a solo career, he has played keyboards with Van Morrison, Jerry Garcia. and Craig Chaquico.

== Early life ==
Ozzie Ahlers was born June 3, 1946, in Summit, New Jersey. During high school he participated in numerous bands, including The Wizards and Oz, winning local talent contests and playing in east coast colleges. Before he graduated from Summit High School, he spent a summer on the road touring as a backup musician with The Shirelles singing group. After graduation, he attended Cornell University in Ithaca, New York, where he formed a popular band in the 1960s, The Oz and Ends, touring colleges for 6 years.

== Career ==
In 1970, Ahlers formed the group Glory River and was signed by Jimi Hendrix's Electric Lady Productions to a recording contract in New York City. The band toured and played numerous venues regularly, including The Electric Circus and Fillmore East. In 1972, Ahlers moved to California, where he toured with Van Morrison and recorded three albums with Jesse Colin Young on Warner Bros. Records. He played the keyboard in Peter Rowan's band Free Mexican Airforce 1977–1978. During these years, he also recorded with Gene Clark of The Byrds and rocker Greg Kihn. In 1978, he was involved with Rob Nilsson's Cine Manifest and composed the film score for Northern Lights, which won the Camera d’Or at The Cannes Film Festival.

In 1979, Ahlers joined the Jerry Garcia Band, both touring and recording with Garcia for the next two years. He played keyboards on the albums Live at the Capitol Theater, After Midnight: Kean College, Garcia Live Volume One, Garcia Live Volume Four and Garcia Plays Dylan. In 1981, he became a founding member, songwriter and keyboard player in the rock-reggae band The Edge with bandmates Lorin Rowan and Jimmy Dillon. In 1990, Ahlers was hired by Gumby creator Art Clokey to create the music for the cult classic Gumby: The Movie, and hired Craig Chaquico from Jefferson Starship to play lead guitar. Owing to the time that it takes to complete a feature-length stop-motion film, the movie wouldn't be released until 1995.

In 1992, Ahlers and Chaquico collaborated and signed with Higher Octave Records. They recorded their first album in 1993, Acoustic Highway, which rose on the Billboard Magazine charts and Radio & Records Magazine. For their next album, Acoustic Planet, they were nominated for a Grammy Award in 1995 as well as charting a No. 1 position in Billboard. For two years in a row, Ahlers and Chaquico won a Bay Area Music Award for Best Independent Album. Ahlers continued playing keyboards, songwriting, and producing ten Chaquico albums for another 16 years, as well as being the musical director for his own worldwide touring band. He became a solo artist on the Higher Octave Music label with his album Fingerpainting.

During the 1990s, Ahlers co-wrote, produced, and played keyboards for four albums by blues artist Jimmy Dillon: Bad and Blue, The Next Frame, Rituals and Everything. He is the musical director for the Blue Star Music Camps for Kids in the Bay Area, founded by guitarist Jimmy Dillon.

In 2011, Ahlers created the DVD piano lesson series Killer Keyboards Made Simple. They have been sold worldwide and continue to be a popular online instructional keyboard series. He also hosts a Webinar Series "The Keyboard Klub" as a streaming instructional group for musicians.

== Discography ==
With The Oz and Ends

- Reconstruction of a Broken Heart (1969)

With Glory River

- Glory River (1970)

With Jesse Colin Young

- Lightshine (1973)
- The Perfect Stranger (1982)
- Makin’ It Real (1993)

With Jerry Garcia Band

- Jerry Garcia Band Live Volume One (1980)
- After Midnight- Live at Kean College (1980)
- Jerry Garcia Band Live Volume Four (1978)
- Garcia Plays Dylan (1981)

With The Edge

- The Edge (1981)
- Jealousy (1982)

Ozzie Ahlers Solo

- Fingerpainting (1997)
- Keys to the Heart (1999)
- Keyboards Made Simple Vol. 1 (2010)
- Keyboards Made Simple Vol. 2 (2012)
- Keyboards Made Simple Vol. 3 (2014)

With Craig Chaquico

- Acoustic Highway (1993)
- Acoustic Planet (Grammy Nominated Album) (1994)
- A Thousand Pictures (1996)
- Once in a Blue Universe (1997)
- Four Corners (1999)
- Panorama (Greatest Hits) (2000)
- From the Redwoods to the Rockies (2001) and Russ Freeman
- Shadow and Light (2002)
- Midnight Noon (2004)
- Holiday (2005)

With Jimmy Dillon

- Fool for Love (1988)
- Bad and Blue (1994)
- The Next Frame (1996)
- Rituals (1997)
- Raw (1998)

Guest Appearances

- MedicineTrail (1980) Peter Rowan
- Firebyrd (1984) Gene Clark
- Kihn of Hearts (1989) Greg Kihn
- Harley Davidson Road Songs (1994) Collection
- Third Force (1995) Third Force
- Higher Octave Collection I (1995) Collection
- Smooth Grooves Vol 1 (1995) Collection
- The Best of New Age (1995) Collection
- Higher Octave Collection II (1995) Collection
- Force Field (1996) Third Force
- Smooth Grooves Vol 2 (1996) Collection
- Instrumental Moods I (1996) Collection
- Panorama (1996) Collection
- Vital Force (1997) Third Force
- Highway 1 (1997) Collection
- In the Mix (1997) Collection
- Instrumental Moods II (1998) Collection
- Sleight of Hand (1998) James Michael Joseph
- Night & Day (1998) Collection
- Guitarra Romantica (2000) Collection
- Grooveology (2001) Collection
- Rendezvous (2002) Collection
- Guitarisma (2003) Collection
