= Melvin Seals =

American musician (born 1953)

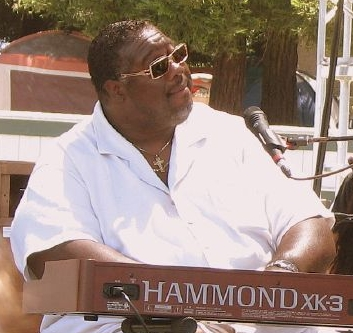
- Seals at the 2008 Harmony Festival

Background information
- Born: September 27, 1953 (age 72)
- Origin: San Francisco, California, U.S.
- Genres: Rock, jam, jazz
- Occupation: Musician
- Instruments: Vocals, piano, organ
- Years active: 1970s–present
- Website: melvinseals.com/

Melvin Seals (born 1953 in San Francisco, California) is an American musician, best known as a longtime member of the Jerry Garcia Band.

== Early life and career ==
Melvin Seals began playing piano at the age of eight and began his musical adventure playing gospel music for his local church. Over the next years, he joined a few different bands in San Francisco and became good at playing other keyboards, particularly the electric organ, which he would play for the majority of his musical career. He went on to record and perform with artists such as Charlie Daniels, Elvin Bishop and Chuck Berry.

== Projects ==
In 1981, Seals joined the Jerry Garcia Band, remaining a member until Jerry Garcia's death in 1995. He had the third-longest tenure in the band next to Garcia and bassist John Kahn, who had been members for the band's entire history. After Garcia and Kahn's deaths in 1995 and 1996 respectively, Seals formed JGB, with which he performs to this day. JGB aims to continue the Jerry Garcia Band’s legacy beyond the loss of some of its key members.

Other projects in which Seals has been involved include The Mix with guitarist John Kadlecik and bassist Kevin Rosen and Steve Kimock's Crazy Engine with Steve Kimock. The original idea for the project was to perform original material.

On July 30, 2004, Seals was the first Jerry Garcia Band member to headline an outdoor music and camping festival named in honor of Jerry Garcia, called Grateful Garcia Gathering. Melvin Seals and JGB members that year included Stu Allen and John Kadlecik. Jerry Garcia Band drummer David Kemper joined Melvin Seals & JGB in 2007. To date, other musicians/friends of Jerry's have included Donna Jean, Mookie Siegel, Pete Sears, G. E. Smith, Barry Sless, Mark Karan, Mike Lawson, Dave Hebert Brian Lesh to name a few musicians.

In 2005, Seals released his first solo CD entitled Melting Pot.

Seals played two concerts with Phil Lesh & Friends at the Capitol Theatre in Port Chester, New York, on May 28 and 29, 2016. This marked Seals' first collaboration with Phil Lesh & Friends. Seals had previously only played with Lesh at two Jerry Garcia Band concerts in the 1980s when Lesh sat in for their regular bassist John Kahn.

In 2017, Seals toured with Oteil Burbridge on his Oteil & Friends tour, which extended into early 2018.

== Discography ==
- Raisin' Hell – Elvin Bishop – 1977
- Run for the Roses – Jerry Garcia – 1982
- Jerry Garcia Band – Jerry Garcia Band – 1991
- How Sweet It Is – Jerry Garcia Band – 1997
- Welcome to Our World – JGB – 1998
- Shining Star – Jerry Garcia Band – 2001
- Pure Jerry: Lunt-Fontanne, New York City, October 31, 1987 – Jerry Garcia Band – 2004
- Pure Jerry: Lunt-Fontanne, New York City, The Best of the Rest, October 15–30, 1987 – Jerry Garcia Band – 2004
- Pure Jerry: Merriweather Post Pavilion, September 1 & 2, 1989 – Jerry Garcia Band – 2005
- Live at Shoreline 9/1/90, DVD – Jerry Garcia Band – 2005
- Melting Pot – Melvin Seals – 2005
- Pure Jerry: Coliseum, Hampton, VA, November 9, 1991 – Jerry Garcia Band – 2006
- Keepers of the Flame – JGB – 2006
- Garcia Live Volume Two – Jerry Garcia Band – 2013
- Fall 1989: The Long Island Sound – Jerry Garcia Band – 2013
- On Broadway: Act One – October 28th, 1987 – Jerry Garcia Band – 2015
- Garcia Live Volume Eight – Jerry Garcia Band – 2017
- Garcia Live Volume 10 – Jerry Garcia Band – 2018
- Electric on the Eel – Jerry Garcia Band – 2019
- Garcia Live Volume 11 – Jerry Garcia Band – 2019
- Garcia Live Volume 13 – Jerry Garcia Band – 2020
- Garcia Live Volume 16 – Jerry Garcia Band – 2021
- Garcia Live Volume 19 – Jerry Garcia Band – 2022
