= Joe Gastwirt =

American audio engineer

Joe Gastwirt is an American audio engineer, known for digitally remastering hundreds of CDs and LPs for famous artists, including the Grateful Dead, Tom Petty, Helen Reddy, Electric Light Orchestra, Jimi Hendrix, Crosby, Stills, and Nash, The Blues Brothers, and Yes. His remasters have been critically acclaimed.
