= On Broadway: Act One – October 28th, 1987 =

2015 live album by Jerry Garcia Band and Jerry Garcia Acoustic Band

Live album by Jerry Garcia Band and Jerry Garcia Acoustic Band
- Released: June 23, 2015
- Recorded: October 28, 1987
- Genre: Rock, rhythm and blues, folk, bluegrass
- Length: 177:32
- Label: ATO
- Producer: Joe Gastwirt

Jerry Garcia Band chronology
Garcia Live Volume Five (2014)	On Broadway: Act One – October 28th, 1987 (2015)	Garcia Live Volume Seven (2016)

Jerry Garcia Acoustic Band chronology
Ragged but Right (2010)	On Broadway: Act One – October 28th, 1987 (2015)

Jerry Garcia chronology
Garcia Live Volume Five (2014)	On Broadway: Act One – October 28th, 1987 (2015)	Garcia Live Volume Six (2016)

On Broadway: Act One – October 28th, 1987 is a three-CD live album by the Jerry Garcia Band and the Jerry Garcia Acoustic Band, two music groups led by Grateful Dead guitarist and singer Jerry Garcia. It contains three complete sets of music, recorded at the Lunt-Fontanne Theatre in New York City on October 28, 1987. It was released by ATO Records on June 23, 2015.

In October 1987 the two Garcia bands played a series of 18 concerts at the Lunt-Fontanne in New York's Broadway theatre district. Each of these shows featured one set of the Jerry Garcia Acoustic Band playing folk and bluegrass songs and one set of the Jerry Garcia Band playing rock and R&B. Music from this concert run was previously documented on the albums Pure Jerry: Lunt-Fontanne, New York City, October 31, 1987 and Pure Jerry: Lunt-Fontanne, New York City, The Best of the Rest, October 15–30, 1987, both of which were released in 2004.

== Recording ==
The Lunt-Fontanne performances were recorded surreptitiously to avoid the ire of the venue's union boss, who imposed a strict no-taping policy. The secret nature of the hidden recording rig, made up of an early DAT recorder, led to the matinee electric set not being recorded on October 28. This set consisted of the following songs: "Get Out of My Life, Woman", "They Love Each Other", "Mission in the Rain", "Like a Road Leading Home", "Love in the Afternoon", "My Sisters and Brothers", "That Lucky Old Sun", "Deal", and "Crazy Love".

== Critical reception ==
Professional ratings
Review scores
Source	Rating
All About Jazz	4.5/5 stars
AllMusic	3/5 stars

On All About Jazz, Doug Collette wrote, "The deliciously relaxed air of the music on these three discs belies the precision in the musicianship as much as it does the operations necessary for a two week run on a Broadway theater."

On AllMusic, Thom Jurek said, "There are some truly inspired moments of guitar interplay between the leader and Nelson on the first two discs, and Seals adds another layer of swing and R&B drive to the electric one. Even with the uncertainties of a first-night performance, these musicians are itching to play together; and, as the tape traders know too well, by the end of this two-week run this group would be rattling the rafter."

On Grateful Web, Dylan Muhlberg wrote, "The first two discs are packed with varied American traditional songs from folk, bluegrass, blues, and spiritual.... The electric set displays the music that Jerry’s band had accumulated in his vast electric incarnations. The chemistry and ease between these players was previously marveled at and these 1987 concerts display some of the finest Garcia Band."

== Track listing ==
Disc one

Matinee (acoustic):

1. Opening announcement – 0:30
2. "Deep Elem Blues" (traditional, arranged by Jerry Garcia Acoustic Band) – 6:56
3. "I'm Troubled" (traditional, arranged by Jerry Garcia Acoustic Band) – 4:16
4. "Spike Driver Blues" (traditional, arranged by Mississippi John Hurt) – 7:06
5. Band introductions – 0:34
6. "Blue Yodel #9" (Jimmie Rodgers) – 6:45
7. "Short Life of Trouble" (G. B. Grayson, Henry Whitter) – 4:05
8. "If I Lose" (Ralph Stanley) – 3:12
9. "I'm Here to Get My Baby Out of Jail" (Karl Davis) – 5:41
10. "Oh Babe It Ain't No Lie" (Elizabeth Cotten) – 6:01
11. "Drifting Too Far from the Shore" (Charles Moody) – 5:10
12. "Ragged but Right" (George Jones) – 5:43

Disc two

Evening (acoustic):

1. Opening announcement – 0:58
2. "I've Been All Around This World" (traditional, arranged by Jerry Garcia Acoustic Band) – 8:09
3. "Ballad of Casey Jones" (traditional, arranged by Hurt) – 5:40
4. "Blue Yodel #9" (Rodgers) – 7:31
5. "I'm Troubled" (traditional, arranged by Jerry Garcia Acoustic Band) – 5:46
6. "Rosa Lee McFall" (Charlie Monroe) – 3:32
7. Band introductions – 1:08
8. "Diamond Joe" (Tex Logan) – 4:29
9. "I Ain't Never" (Mel Tillis, Michael Webb Pierce) – 4:17
10. "It's a Long Long Way to the Top of the World" (Don Wayne) – 3:56
11. "Bright Morning Stars" (traditional, arranged by Stanley) – 2:19
12. "Ragged but Right" (Jones) – 5:18

Disc three

Evening (electric):

1. "How Sweet It Is (To Be Loved by You)" (Brian Holland, Lamont Dozier, Eddie Holland) – 7:14
2. "Forever Young" (Bob Dylan) – 9:53
3. "Stop That Train" (Peter Tosh) – 8:38
4. Band introductions – 0:29
5. "Run for the Roses" (Jerry Garcia, Robert Hunter) – 5:56
6. "Evangeline" (Louis Perez, David Hidalgo) – 3:38
7. "Knockin' on Heaven's Door" (Dylan) – 10:13
8. "Gomorrah" (Garcia, Hunter) – 6:40
9. "Tangled Up in Blue" (Dylan) – 10:57
10. "My Sisters and Brothers" (Charles Johnson) – 4:44

== Personnel ==
Jerry Garcia Acoustic Band

- Jerry Garcia – acoustic guitar, vocals
- John Kahn – double bass
- David Kemper – drums
- Kenny Kosek – fiddle
- David Nelson – acoustic guitar, vocals
- Sandy Rothman – mandolin, banjo, dobro, vocals

Jerry Garcia Band

- Jerry Garcia – electric guitar, vocals
- Gloria Jones – vocals
- John Kahn – bass guitar
- David Kemper – drums
- Jaclyn LaBranch – vocals
- Melvin Seals – organ

Production

- Produced and mastered for release by Joe Gastwirt
- Original music produced by Jerry Garcia
- Recording: John Cutler
- Curating: Marc Allan, Kevin Monty
- Art direction, design, illustration: Nick Steinhardt
- Liner notes essay: Dennis McNally
- Archival research: Nicholas Meriwether
- Photos: Herb Greene, Bob Minkin
