= Before the Dead =

Live album by Jerry Garcia
- Released: May 11, 2018
- Recorded: 1961 – 1964
- Genre: Folk, bluegrass
- Length: 221:59
- Label: Round
- Producer: Dennis McNally, Brian Miksis

Jerry Garcia chronology
Garcia Live Volume 10 (2018)	Before the Dead (2018)	Electric on the Eel (2019)

Before the Dead is an album by Jerry Garcia. It is a compilation of early recordings of Garcia playing folk and bluegrass music with various other musicians. The recordings were made from 1961 to 1964, before Garcia co-founded the rock band the Grateful Dead. Produced as a four-CD box set, and also as a five-LP limited edition box set, it was released on May 11, 2018.

== Recording ==
In the early 1960s, the American folk music revival was in full swing, and the San Francisco Bay Area had its own folk scene. In 1961, after getting out of the Army, Jerry Garcia started playing folk music and other old-time songs. Garcia would sing and play acoustic guitar as a member of various ensembles and bands. Over the next few years, Garcia also became interested in bluegrass music, and learned to play the banjo. As his music skills evolved, he continued to play in different bands with similarly inclined musicians. A number of these performances were captured on reel-to-reel tape. In 1965, after a dalliance with jug band music, Garcia co-founded the rock band the Grateful Dead.

Before the Dead includes performances by several musicians who also collaborated with Garcia in later years. Robert Hunter wrote the lyrics for many Grateful Dead songs; David Nelson was a member of the New Riders of the Purple Sage; and Nelson and Sandy Rothman were members of the Jerry Garcia Acoustic Band.

== Production ==
Before the Dead was produced by Dennis McNally, an author and former publicist for the Grateful Dead, and Brian Miksis, a documentarian and audio engineer. The two worked together to track down some of the original recordings from Jerry Garcia's formative years as a musician. They also assembled many new short essays about the songs and the early '60s folk scene in the Bay Area, along with photographs from that time.

The 1962 performance by the Hart Valley Drifters, at the studio of Stanford University radio station KZSU, was previously released as the album Folk Time.

== Critical reception ==
In Rolling Stone, David Browne wrote, "... Garcia spent several years immersed in bluegrass and folk, playing in a succession of Palo Alto-area bands with oddball names like the Sleepy Hollow Hog Stompers. To date, only a small portion of the recordings he made with those combos has been released, making the multi-disc Before the Dead the deepest – and most educational – dive yet into Garcia's pre-Dead musical life. Right up to his death, Garcia would periodically revisit his bluegrass roots, from the wonderful but short-lived Old & In the Way to albums he made with mandolinist David Grisman. But Before the Dead reveals, in more detail than ever before, when and how that appetite began and why numbers like "Deep Elem Blues" and "Rosa Lee McFall", both heard here, made their way into the Dead's repertoire."

In DownBeat, Jesse Jarnow said, "An illuminating new box set, Before the Dead... shines light on Garcia's earliest music – recordings between 1961 and 1964 – most often remembered as his "bluegrass period" for his virtuosic banjo playing. But the four-CD/five-LP collection reveals a far richer picture.... No casual player, the nearly four hours of music uncover a musician filled with ambition and energy. By a year after the earliest recording, Garcia had turned to banjo. That, too, became a progression, from the ghostly frailings of the Sleepy Hollow Hog Stompers, recorded in June 1962 ("Little Birdie"), to the shredding Bill Keith style he'd accentuated by his time with the Black Mountain Boys in 1964 ("Salt Creek"). The sequence resulted in Garcia's instantly recognizable electric guitar playing with the Dead, each crystalline, articulated note picked with a banjoist’s precision."

In Glide Magazine, Doug Collette wrote, "In roughly three and half hours of live and studio recordings, captured in various ways at a variety of locales between 1961 and 1964, Before the Dead documents the late Jerry Garcia's formative years as a musician. Overflowing with meticulous attention to detail in sound, text and graphics, this 4-CD/5-LP box set reveals how this iconic musician nurtured those attributes that eventually stood him in such good stead as titular leader of the Grateful Dead... If Before the Dead proves anything, it is that this man's passion for playing, as well as his insatiable curiosity about a diversity of styles, traditional and otherwise, was well-established long before the coalescence of the Grateful Dead."

== Track listing ==
Disc 1

Bob and Jerry – May 26, 1961:

1. "Santy Anno" (traditional) – 2:15
2. "I Got a Home in That Rock" (traditional) – 1:46
3. "Oh, Mary Don't You Weep" (traditional) – 3:31
4. "All My Trials" (traditional) – 4:01
5. "I Was Born Ten Thousand Years Ago" (H. C. Verner, Harry C. Clyde) – 2:12
6. "Blow the Candles Out" (traditional) – 2:02
7. "Rake and a Rambling Boy" (traditional, arranged by Joan Baez) – 1:31
8. "Trouble in Mind" (Richard M. Jones) – 3:10

Jerry Garcia, Marshall Leicester, and Robert Hunter – July 1961:

9. "Brown's Ferry Blues" (Alton Delmore, Rabon Delmore) – 2:51
10. "Jesse James" (traditional) – 4:13

Jerry Garcia and unknown musician – summer or fall 1961:

11. "Down in the Willow Garden" (traditional) – 1:48
12. "Long Lonesome Road" (traditional) – 2:39
13. "Railroad Bill" (traditional) – 3:17
14. "The Wagoner's Lad" (traditional) – 3:00
15. "Katie Cruel" (traditional) – 3:40

Disc 2

Sleepy Hollow Hog Stompers – June 11, 1962:

1. "Cannonball Blues" (A. P. Carter) – 3:02
2. "Little Birdie (traditional) – 3:17
3. "Sally Goodin" (traditional) – 2:06
4. "Hold That Woodpile Down" (Edward Harrigan, Tony Hart) – 3:32
5. "Legend of the Johnson Boys" (traditional) – 3:10
6. "Shady Grove" (traditional) – 2:49
7. "Sweet Sunny South" (traditional) – 3:13
8. "Man of Constant Sorrow" (traditional) – 2:26

Hart Valley Drifters – fall 1962:

9. Band introductions – 1:12
10. "Roving Gambler" (traditional) – 3:46
11. "Ground Speed" (Earl Scruggs) – 1:29
12. "Pig in a Pen" (Fiddlin' Arthur Smith, arranged by Jerry Garcia) – 2:15
13. "Standing in the Need of a Prayer" (traditional) – 2:09
14. "Flint Hill Special" (Earl Scruggs) – 2:00
15. "Nine Pound Hammer" (traditional) – 2:42
16. "Handsome Molly" (G. B. Grayson, Henry Whitter) – 2:19
17. "Clinch Mountain Backstep" (Ralph Stanley, Ruby Rakes) – 1:18
18. "Think of What You've Done" (Carter Stanley) – 2:41
19. "Cripple Creek" (traditional) – 1:24
20. "All the Good Times Have Past and Gone" (traditional) – 3:07
21. "Billy Grimes, the Rover" (traditional) – 2:42
22. "Paddy on the Turnpike" (traditional) – 1:38
23. "Run Mountain" (J. E. Mainer) – 4:11
24. "Sugar Baby" (Dock Boggs) – 3:52
25. "Sitting on Top of the World" (Walter Vinson, Lonnie Carter) – 3:37

Disc 3

The Wildwood Boys – February 23, 1963:

1. "Roll in My Sweet Baby's Arms" (Buster Carter, Preston Young) – 3:25
2. "Jerry's Breakdown" (Jerry Garcia) – 2:08
3. "Standing in the Need of Prayer" (traditional) – 2:39
4. "Mule Skinner Blues" (Jimmie Rodgers, George Vaughn) – 3:23
5. "Saturday Night Shuffle" (Merle Travis) – 2:05
6. "Pike County Breakdown" (Rupert Jones) – 1:44
7. "My Little Sparrow" (traditional) – 3:25
8. "We Shall Not Be Moved" (traditional) – 2:41

Jerry and Sara – May 4, 1963:

9. "Deep Elem Blues" (Joe Shelton, Robert Shelton) – 3:17
10. "Will the Weaver" (traditional) – 3:14
11. "I Truly Understand" (traditional) – 3:20
12. "Long Black Veil" (Danny Dill, Marijohn Wilkin) – 4:28
13. "The Man That Wrote That Home Sweet Home Never Was a Married Man" (traditional) – 3:38
14. "Foggy Mountain Top" (A. P. Carter) – 3:13

Disc 4

Black Mountain Boys – fall 1963:

1. "Barefoot Nellie" (Don Reno, Jim Davis) – 3:41
2. "She's More to Be Pitied" (Carter Stanley) – 3:26
3. "Noah's Breakdown" (Noah Crase) – 2:18
4. "Who Will Sing for Me?" (Thomas J. Farris) – 2:07

Black Mountain Boys – January 10, 1964:

5. "Salt Creek" (Bradford Keith, Bill Monroe) – 2:19
6. "Jody's Hornpipe" (Bill Monroe) – 1:51
7. "Rosa Lee McFall" (Charlie Monroe) – 2:31
8. "John Hardy" (traditional) – 1:26

Black Mountain Boys – March 6, 1964:

9. "Katie Kline" (traditional) – 3:17
10. "Walkin' the Dog" (E.M. Grimsley, W.C. Grimsley) – 2:10
11. "Paddy on the Turnpike" (traditional) – 3:12
12. "Love and Wealth" (Ira Louvin, Charlie Louvin) – 2:19
13. "Sourwood Mountain" (traditional) – 0:45
14. "If I Lose" (Ralph Stanley) – 2:16
15. "Homestead on the Farm" (A. P. Carter) – 2:20
16. "Stony Creek" (Jesse McReynolds, Jim McReynolds) – 2:24
17. "Salty Dog Blues" (Zeke Morris, Wiley Morris) – 2:28
18. "Love Please Come Home" (Leon Jackson) – 2:21
19. "Make Me a Pallet on the Floor" (traditional) – 2:27
20. "Darlin' Allalee" (traditional) – 2:08
21. "In the Pines" (Slim Bryant, Jimmie Davis, Clayton McMichen) – 3:25
22. "Raw Hide" (Bill Monroe) – 2:32
23. "Black Mountain Rag" (traditional) – 2:12
24. "True Life Blues" (Bill Monroe) – 2:21
25. Medley: "Devil's Dream" / "Sailor's Hornpipe" (traditional) – 1:45

Black Mountain Boys – spring 1964:

26. "Drink Up and Go Home" (Freddie Hart) – 3:05

Asphalt Jungle Mountain Boys – summer 1964:

27. "These Men of God" (R. Ellis, P. Williams, J. Williams) – 3:14
28. "Roll On Buddy" (traditional) – 2:11
29. "Goodbye Old Pal" (Bill Monroe) – 1:50
30. "Back Up and Push" (traditional) – 1:10

== Personnel ==
=== Musicians ===
Bob and Jerry

- Jerry Garcia – guitar, vocals
- Robert Hunter – vocals

Jerry Garcia, Marshall Leicester, and Robert Hunter

- Jerry Garcia – guitar, vocals
- Robert Hunter – bass, mandolin
- Marshall Leicester – banjo, guitar, vocals

Jerry Garcia and unknown musician

- Jerry Garcia – guitar, vocals
- Unknown musician – bass

Sleepy Hollow Hog Stompers

- Jerry Garcia – banjo, guitar, vocals
- Dick Arnold – fiddle, vocals
- Marshall Leicester – banjo, guitar, vocals

Hart Valley Drifters

- Jerry Garcia – banjo, guitar, vocals
- Ken Frankel – banjo, fiddle, guitar
- Robert Hunter – bass, vocals
- Norm Van Maastricht – dobro
- David Nelson – guitar, vocals

The Wildwood Boys

- Jerry Garcia – banjo, guitar, vocals
- Robert Hunter – mandolin, vocals
- David Nelson – guitar, vocals
- Norm Van Maastricht – bass, guitar, vocals

Jerry and Sara

- Jerry Garcia – banjo, guitar, mandolin, vocals
- Sara Ruppenthal Garcia – guitar, vocals

Black Mountain Boys

Fall 1963 and January 10, 1964

- Jerry Garcia – banjo, guitar, vocals
- Robert Hunter – bass, vocals
- David Nelson – mandolin, vocals
- Eric Thompson – guitar, vocals

Black Mountain Boys

March 6, 1964

- Jerry Garcia – banjo, guitar, vocals
- Geoff Levin – bass
- David Nelson – mandolin, vocals
- Sandy Rothman – guitar, vocals

Black Mountain Boys

Spring 1964

- Jerry Garcia – banjo, vocals
- David Nelson – mandolin, vocals
- Sandy Rothman – guitar, vocals

Asphalt Jungle Mountain Boys

- Jerry Garcia – banjo, vocals
- Jody Stecher – mandolin, vocals
- Eric Thompson – guitar
- Herb Pedersen – vocals on "These Men of God"
- Butch Waller – vocals on "These Men of God"

=== Production ===
- Produced by Dennis McNally, Brian Miksis
- Mastering: Fred Kevorkian
- Art direction, design: Frank Harkins
- Liner notes: Dennis McNally, Brian Miksis, Neil Rosenberg, Sara Ruppenthal Katz, Stu Goldman, Sandy Rothman
- Painting of Jerry Garcia by Brigid Meier
