= Electric on the Eel =

Live album by Jerry Garcia Band
- Released: March 15, 2019
- Recorded: 1987, 1989, 1991
- Venue: French's Camp, Piercy, California
- Genre: Rock, rhythm and blues
- Length: 347:41 (bonus disc 53:11)
- Label: Round
- Producer: Marc Allan, Kevin Monty

Jerry Garcia Band chronology
Garcia Live Volume 10 (2018)	Electric on the Eel (2019)	Garcia Live Volume 11 (2019)

Jerry Garcia chronology
Before the Dead (2018)	Electric on the Eel (2019)	Garcia Live Volume 11 (2019)

Electric on the Eel is a live album by the Jerry Garcia Band. It contains three complete concerts on six CDs. The shows were recorded on August 29, 1987, June 10, 1989, and August 10, 1991 at French's Camp in Piercy, California, near the Eel River. The album was released on March 15, 2019.

The three performances were promoted by Bill Graham and Wavy Gravy as benefit concerts for the nearby Hog Farm commune. They featured the mid-1980s to early-1990s lineup of the Jerry Garcia Band – Jerry Garcia on guitar and vocals, Melvin Seals on keyboards, John Kahn on bass, David Kemper on drums, and Gloria Jones and Jaclyn LaBranch on vocals.

Some copies of the album include a bonus disc called Acoustic on the Eel, recorded by the Jerry Garcia Acoustic Band at the August 29, 1987 concert.

Additionally, Electric on the Eel: August 10th, 1991, a four-disc vinyl LP recording of that concert, was released on April 13, 2019 as part of Record Store Day.

== Release and reception ==
Electric on the Eel debuted at number 1 on the Billboard Independent Albums chart, and at number 154 on the Billboard 200.

On Pitchfork, Jessie Jarnow wrote, "[The recordings] show Jerry Garcia at both the height of his fame and simultaneously escaping into his not-so-secret identity: himself.... [T]he scope of the set is also a fine way for the Jerry-curious to take a deeper dive into what many consider to be the Garcia Band's golden period.... Its six discs are both a comprehensive document of the group's penultimate lineup and a fine introduction to the Jerry Garcia Band at their best, music to make the hassles disappear."

On AllMusic, Timothy Monger wrote, "Captured during the height of Garcia's late-period fame, these sets have a joyful and relaxed air to them, as did many of the Jerry Garcia Band shows of that era which often provided to him a sense of escapism from the touring and cultural behemoth that the Grateful Dead had become."

Glide Magazine said, "The six compact discs document a period in which this iconic musician was, arguably, as fully and joyfully engaged in such musical endeavors as any other time prior to his untimely passing in 1995.... Though the box set proper focuses on the electric sets, an Acoustic on the Eel bonus disc is also available exclusively at independent record stores and through JerryGarcia.com and it complements the primary contents..."

== Track listing ==
Disc 1

August 29, 1987 – first set:

1. "How Sweet It Is (To Be Loved by You)" (Lamont Dozier, Brian Holland, Eddie Holland) – 7:10
2. "Forever Young" (Bob Dylan) – 7:22
3. "Get Out of My Life, Woman" (Allen Toussaint) – 6:46
4. "Run for the Roses" (Jerry Garcia, Robert Hunter) – 5:16
5. "And It Stoned Me" (Van Morrison) – 6:14
6. "My Sisters and Brothers" (Charles Johnson) – 4:01
7. "Deal" (Garcia, Hunter) – 6:58

Disc 2

August 29, 1987 – second set:

1. "The Harder They Come" (Jimmy Cliff) – 10:25
2. "I Shall Be Released" (Dylan) – 7:28
3. "Think" (Jimmy McCracklin, Deadric Malone) – 6:36
4. "Evangeline" (David Hidalgo, Louie Perez) – 2:57
5. "Gomorrah" (Garcia, Hunter) – 6:20
6. "Let It Rock" (Chuck Berry) – 6:37
7. "That Lucky Old Sun" (Haven Gillespie, Beasley Smith) – 8:30
8. "Tangled Up in Blue" (Dylan) – 9:43

Disc 3

June 10, 1989 – first set:

1. "I'll Take a Melody" (Toussaint) – 10:23
2. "They Love Each Other" (Garcia, Hunter) – 6:20
3. "Get Out of My Life Woman" (Toussaint) – 7:51
4. "Run for the Roses" (Garcia, Hunter) – 5:31
5. "Stop That Train" (Peter Tosh) – 8:09
6. "Mission in the Rain" (Garcia, Hunter) – 7:41
7. "My Sisters and Brothers" (Johnson) – 4:08
8. "Deal" (Garcia, Hunter) – 7:25

Disc 4

June 10, 1989 – second set:

1. "The Harder They Come" (Cliff) – 11:16
2. "Waiting for a Miracle" (Bruce Cockburn) – 6:16
3. "I Shall Be Released" (Dylan) – 10:22
4. "Think" (McCracklin, Malone) – 6:54
5. "I Hope It Won't Be This Way Always" (Barbara Allison) – 4:50
6. "Don't Let Go" (Jesse Stone) – 14:13
7. "Evangeline" (Hidalgo, Perez) – 3:35
8. "That Lucky Old Sun" (Gillespie, Smith) – 8:45
9. "Tangled Up in Blue" (Bob Dylan) – 10:30

Disc 5

August 10, 1991 – first set:

1. "The Way You Do the Things You Do" (Smokey Robinson, Bobby Rogers) – 10:41
2. "And It Stoned Me" (Morrison) – 8:25
3. "You Never Can Tell (C'est La Vie)" (Berry) – 7:08
4. "Waiting for a Miracle" (Cockburn) – 5:32
5. "Struggling Man" (Cliff) – 6:34
6. "My Sisters and Brothers" (Johnson) – 4:53
7. "Deal" (Garcia, Hunter) – 8:18

Disc 6

August 10, 1991 – second set:

1. "Shining Star" (Paul Richmond, Leo Graham) – 11:29
2. "Think" (McCracklin, Malone) – 7:13
3. "Lay Down Sally" (Eric Clapton, Marcy Levy, George Terry) – 8:00
4. "Twilight" (Robbie Robertson) – 9:24
5. "See What Love Can Do" (Jerry Lynn Williams) – 6:32
6. "Lazy Bones" (Hoagy Carmichael, Johnny Mercer) – 6:28
7. "Everybody Needs Somebody to Love" (Jerry Wexler, Bert Berns, Solomon Burke) – 10:25

Bonus disc: Acoustic on the Eel

Jerry Garcia Acoustic Band – August 29, 1987:

1. "Deep Elem Blues" (Joe Shelton, Robert Shelton) – 6:56
2. "I've Been All Around This World" (traditional, arranged by Jerry Garcia Acoustic Band) – 5:50
3. "Friend of the Devil" (John Dawson, Garcia, Hunter) – 7:23
4. "Trouble in Mind" (Richard M. Jones) – 5:06
5. "Little Sadie" (traditional, arranged by Jerry Garcia Acoustic Band) – 4:08
6. "Diamond Joe" (Tex Logan) – 4:08
7. "Spike Driver Blues" (Mississippi John Hurt) – 4:54
8. "Oh Babe, It Ain't No Lie" (Elizabeth Cotten) – 5:51
9. "I'm Troubled" (traditional, arranged by Jerry Garcia Acoustic Band) – 4:26
10. "Ripple" (Garcia, Hunter) – 4:27

== Personnel ==
Jerry Garcia Band

- Jerry Garcia – guitar, vocals
- Melvin Seals – keyboards
- John Kahn – bass
- David Kemper – drums
- Jaclyn LaBranch – backing vocals
- Gloria Jones – backing vocals

Jerry Garcia Acoustic Band

- Jerry Garcia – guitar, vocals
- Sandy Rothman – banjo, dobro, mandolin, vocals
- David Nelson – guitar, vocals
- John Kahn – bass

Production

- Produced by Marc Allan, Kevin Monty
- Project Coordination by Lauren Goetzinger
- Recording: John Cutler
- Mastering: Fred Kevorkian
- Design and illustration: Thos Chapman
- Package layout and design: Ryan Corey

== Charts ==
Chart (2019)	Peak position
US Billboard 200	154
US Independent Albums (Billboard)	1
