= Almost Acoustic =

Live album by Jerry Garcia Acoustic Band
- Released: December 6, 1988
- Recorded: November 27–December 6, 1987
- Genre: Folk, bluegrass
- Length: 70:11
- Label: Grateful Dead Records
- Producer: Sandy Rothman

Jerry Garcia Acoustic Band chronology
Almost Acoustic (1988)	Pure Jerry: Lunt-Fontanne, New York City, October 31, 1987 (2004)

Jerry Garcia chronology
Keystone Encores (1988)	Almost Acoustic (1988)	Jerry Garcia / David Grisman (1991)

Professional ratings
Review scores
Source	Rating
AllMusic	4.5/5 stars

Almost Acoustic is a live album by the Jerry Garcia Acoustic Band. It contains songs that were recorded from late November to early December 1987 at the Warfield Theatre in San Francisco and the Wiltern Theatre in Los Angeles. It was released on December 6, 1988.

The Jerry Garcia Acoustic Band was a short-lived musical ensemble that played folk and bluegrass music, using acoustic instruments. The members of the band were Jerry Garcia on guitar and vocals, David Nelson on guitar and vocals, Sandy Rothman on mandolin, Dobro, and vocals, John Kahn on double bass, Kenny Kosek on fiddle, and, on some songs, David Kemper on snare drum.

A second album by the Jerry Garcia Acoustic Band, also recorded live in 1987, is Ragged but Right, which was released in 2010. Additionally, three live albums from the 1987 Lunt-Fontanne shows that were released in some years later include music by the Jerry Garcia Acoustic Band as well as the Jerry Garcia Band — Pure Jerry: Lunt-Fontanne, New York City, October 31, 1987, Pure Jerry: Lunt-Fontanne, New York City, The Best of the Rest, October 15–30, 1987, and On Broadway: Act One – October 28th, 1987.

== Track listing ==
No.	Title	Writer(s)	Recording Date	Length
1.	"Swing Low, Sweet Chariot"	traditional	December 3, 1987, Wiltern Theatre	3:30
2.	"Deep Elem Blues"	traditional	December 5, 1987, Wiltern Theatre	6:09
3.	"Blue Yodel #9 (Standing on the Corner)"	Jimmie Rodgers	November 27, 1987, Warfield Theatre	6:12
4.	"Spike Driver's Blues"	Mississippi John Hurt	December 3, 1987, Wiltern Theatre	6:44
5.	"I've Been All Around This World"	traditional	December 3, 1987, Wiltern Theatre	6:18
6.	"Here to Get My Baby Out of Jail"	Karl Davis, Harty Taylor	November 28, 1987, Warfield Theatre	5:16
7.	"I'm Troubled"	traditional	November 27, 1987, Warfield Theatre	4:52
8.	"Oh, the Wind and Rain"	traditional	December 5, 1987, Wiltern Theatre	4:39
9.	"The Girl at the Crossroads Bar"	Bill Bryson	November 29, 1987, Warfield Theatre	2:37
10.	"Oh, Babe, It Ain't No Lie"	Elizabeth Cotten	December 6, 1987, Wiltern Theatre	6:19
11.	"Casey Jones"	Hurt	December 4, 1987, Wiltern Theatre	4:05
12.	"Diamond Joe"	Tex Logan	December 6, 1987, Wiltern Theatre	3:29
13.	"Gone Home"	Bill Carlisle	December 6, 1987, Wiltern Theatre	4:41
14.	"Ripple"	Jerry Garcia, Robert Hunter	December 4, 1987, Wiltern Theatre	4:21
Total length:				1:10:11

== Personnel ==
=== Jerry Garcia Acoustic Band ===
- Jerry Garcia – guitar, vocals
- David Nelson – guitar, vocals
- Sandy Rothman – mandolin, Dobro, vocals
- John Kahn – acoustic bass
- Kenny Kosek – fiddle
- David Kemper – snare drum

=== Production ===
- Producer – Sandy Rothman
- Live stereo recording – John Cutler
- Digital editing – Sonic Solutions
- Digital mastering – Joe Gastwirt
- Cover art – John Kahn
- Photography – Ken Friedman
