= Ragged but Right (album) =

Live album by Jerry Garcia Acoustic Band
- Released: November 16, 2010
- Recorded: October – December, 1987
- Genre: Folk, bluegrass
- Label: Jerry Made
- Producer: Sandy Rothman

Jerry Garcia Acoustic Band chronology
Pure Jerry: Lunt-Fontanne, New York City, The Best of the Rest, October 15–30, 1987 (2004)	Ragged but Right (2010)	On Broadway: Act One – October 28th, 1987 (2015)

Jerry Garcia chronology
Let It Rock: The Jerry Garcia Collection, Vol. 2 (2009)	Ragged but Right (2010)	Keystone Companions: The Complete 1973 Fantasy Recordings (2012)

Ragged but Right is the second live album by the Jerry Garcia Acoustic Band. It was recorded in October and December 1987 at the Lunt-Fontanne Theatre in New York City, the Wiltern Theatre in Los Angeles, and the Warfield Theatre in San Francisco. It was released on November 16, 2010, twenty-two years after the band's first album, Almost Acoustic.

The Jerry Garcia Acoustic Band existed from the summer of 1987 to the summer of 1988, and played fewer than 30 concerts. Led by Jerry Garcia of the Grateful Dead, the band included three members of the 1964 bluegrass band the Black Mountain Boys — Garcia on guitar and vocals, David Nelson of the New Riders of the Purple Sage on guitar and vocals, and Sandy Rothman on mandolin, dobro, banjo, and vocals — plus long-time Garcia collaborator John Kahn on acoustic bass, Kenny Kosek on fiddle, and David Kemper on snare drum.

Three other albums contain music by the Jerry Garcia Acoustic Band as well as by the electric Jerry Garcia Band. They are Pure Jerry: Lunt-Fontanne, New York City, October 31, 1987, with two out of four CDs by the Acoustic Band, Pure Jerry: Lunt-Fontanne, New York City, The Best of the Rest, October 15–30, 1987, with one out of three CDs by the Acoustic Band, and On Broadway: Act One – October 28th, 1987, with two out of three CDs by the unplugged ensemble.

== Critical reception ==
Professional ratings
Review scores
Source	Rating
AllMusic	3.5/5 stars

On AllMusic, William Rhulmann wrote, "Garcia, Nelson, and Rothman sing in three-part harmony, enthusiastically essaying songs associated with the likes of Riley Puckett, the Stoney Mountain Boys, Charlie Monroe, and Ralph Stanley, among others.... 'Ragged but right' is a good description of the contents. Grateful Dead fans may take special interest in the version of 'Goodnight Irene,' which is rearranged so differently from familiar renditions that it's practically a different song, at least in terms of the music; it sounds like it could have been on Garcia's first solo album from 1972."

On Jambands.com, John Patrick Gatta contrasted Ragged but Right with its predecessor, saying "The main difference between the two can be found in the warm quality of Almost Acoustic versus the soundboard/audience matrix-like sonics heard on Ragged. It's not a slam, but a necessary point because the newly released album has a much different sensibility.... Feeding off the rowdy atmosphere, it's a high-spirited performance. Offering an indication of the looseness of the performance, Garcia jokes to anyone that skipped work for the early show that he's going to call their bosses. Despite this, there's, obviously, a respect for the songs and disciplined interaction between the players."

Glide magazine listed Ragged but Right as one of the ten best archival releases of 2010, saying "This year's Jerry Garcia archival release featured the short-lived, but most-excellent Jerry Garcia Acoustic Band. Not only did Jer's family put out a remastered version of 1988's Almost Acoustic, but they also released a fine album of unreleased live material called Ragged but Right which contained the other 14 songs in the JGAB's repertoire lovingly assembled by band member Sandy Rothman."

== Track listing ==
1. "Ragged but Right" (traditional)
2. "Short Life of Trouble" (G. B. Grayson)
3. "I Ain't Never" (Webb Pierce, Mel Tillis)
4. "Trouble in Mind" (Richard M. Jones)
5. "Drifting with the Tide" (traditional)
6. Band introductions
7. "Deep Elem Blues" (traditional)
8. "Rosa Lee McFall" (traditional, Bill Monroe)
9. "Two Soldiers" (traditional)
10. "If I Lose" (traditional, Ralph Stanley)
11. "Bright Morning Stars" (traditional)
12. "Goodnight Irene" (traditional)
13. "It's a Long Long Way (To the Top of the World)" (Don Wayne)
14. "Drifting Too Far from the Shore" (Charles E. Moody)
15. "Turtle Dove" (traditional)

== Personnel ==
=== Jerry Garcia Acoustic Band ===
- Jerry Garcia – guitar, vocals
- David Nelson – guitar, vocals
- Sandy Rothman – mandolin, dobro, banjo, vocals
- John Kahn – acoustic bass
- Kenny Kosek – fiddle
- David Kemper – snare drum

=== Production ===
- Sandy Rothman – producer, liner notes
- John Cutler – recording
- Joe Gastwirt – mastering, editing
- Brendan Doyle – editing
- Steve Silberman – essay
