= Pure Jerry: Lunt-Fontanne, New York City, October 31, 1987 =

Live album by Jerry Garcia Band and Jerry Garcia Acoustic Band
- Released: November 2004
- Recorded: October 31, 1987
- Genre: Rock, rhythm and blues, folk
- Length: 242:01
- Label: Jerry Made

Jerry Garcia Band chronology
After Midnight: Kean College, 2/28/80 (2004)	Pure Jerry: Lunt-Fontanne, New York City, October 31, 1987 (2004)	Pure Jerry: Lunt-Fontanne, New York City, The Best of the Rest, October 15–30, 1987 (2004)

Jerry Garcia Acoustic Band chronology
Almost Acoustic (1988)	Pure Jerry: Lunt-Fontanne, New York City, October 31, 1987 (2004)	Pure Jerry: Lunt-Fontanne, New York City, The Best of the Rest, October 15–30, 1987 (2004)

Jerry Garcia chronology
After Midnight: Kean College, 2/28/80 (2004)	Pure Jerry: Lunt-Fontanne, New York City, October 31, 1987 (2004)	Pure Jerry: Lunt-Fontanne, New York City, The Best of the Rest, October 15–30, 1987 (2004)

Pure Jerry: Lunt-Fontanne, New York City, October 31, 1987 is a four-CD live album by Jerry Garcia. It features performances by both the Jerry Garcia Band and the Jerry Garcia Acoustic Band. It contains two complete concerts, both recorded at the Lunt-Fontanne Theatre in New York City on October 31, 1987. The second in the Pure Jerry series of archival concert albums, it was released in November 2004.

The Jerry Garcia Band was Jerry Garcia's main side project from 1975 to 1995 when he was not on tour with the Grateful Dead. The group had an evolving lineup that included Melvin Seals on keyboards starting in late 1980, and John Kahn on bass for the band's entire existence. By contrast, the Jerry Garcia Acoustic Band only existed from the summer of 1987 to the summer of 1988. In the second half of October 1987, the two bands played a series of concerts at the Lunt-Fontanne Theatre in Midtown Manhattan. At each show, the acoustic band would play a set of music, and the electric band would play a second set.

The second and third entries in the Pure Jerry series of live albums, released simultaneously in November 2004, document these concerts. Pure Jerry: Lunt-Fontanne, New York City, October 31, 1987 contains all of the final two concerts of the run — the early show and the late show performed on Halloween. This album has two CDs of music played by the electric Jerry Garcia Band and two CDs by the Jerry Garcia Acoustic Band. Pure Jerry: Lunt-Fontanne, New York City, The Best of the Rest, October 15–30, 1987, includes selections from the entire run of concerts. It has two CDs by the Jerry Garcia Band and one CD by the Jerry Garcia Acoustic Band.

== Critical reception ==
Professional ratings
Review scores
Source	Rating
Allmusic	4.5/5 stars
The Music Box	3/5 stars

On Allmusic, Lindsay Planer said, "As if the very nature and location of the concerts were not enough, the song selection is sublime and offers a faultless sampling of the artist's work. This is most pointedly the case during the acoustic programs, as Garcia and company present a primer in Americana 101 music appreciation.... The pair of 'plugged-in' entries are much in keeping with the style and format that the Jerry Garcia Band had been doing since its mid-'70s inception.... Although the audio is heavy on the audience, Pure Jerry: Lunt-Fontanne, NYC, 10/31/87 and the companion Pure Jerry: Lunt-Fontanne, The Best of the Rest are recommended for those inclined..."

In The Music Box, John Metzger wrote, "... the manner in which Garcia and his acoustic-based entourage merged rustic folk with earthy grooves effectively circled the wagons for a trip across the dusty back-roads of America.... Similarly, the electric ensemble... projected a potent synthesis of styles, albeit one with an entirely different perspective of music history. Instead of touching upon a variety of old-time sounds, the fully amplified unit traversed an even broader terrain by adding a heavy dose of driving rock and soul-infused R&B to its blend of folk, bluegrass, and blues.... the sound quality is noticeably less than perfect, and although the deficiency quietly settles into the background, it never manages to disappear completely.... those with a little patience surely will discover a wealth of treasures that are uniquely rewarding and full of the rich textures that typically fed Garcia’s insatiable muse."

Jambands.com said, "The four–disc set, consisting of two acoustic shows and two electric sets, dissects the definitive elements of Garcia's musical identity with fluid ease.... Though it's the acoustic element that carries the weight of this album's appeal, the juxtaposition provides a portrait of Garcia that is as intimate as it is complete, making it as must-have for Garcia fanatics, bluegrass fiends and Deadheads alike, but even more essential for poor shlubs who just love music."

== Track listing ==
Disc 1 – Matinee, acoustic set

1. "I've Been All Around This World" (traditional) – 6:43
2. "I'm Troubled" (traditional) – 5:54
3. "Short Life of Trouble" (G. B. Grayson) – 3:43
4. Band introduction – 1:22
5. "Blue Yodel #9 (Standing on the Corner)" (Jimmie Rodgers) – 6:19
6. "Spike Driver Blues" (Mississippi John Hurt) – 7:12
7. "Trouble in Mind" (Richard M. Jones) – 6:34
8. "The Girl at the Crossroads Bar" (Bill Bryson) – 3:27
9. "Bright Morning Stars" (traditional) – 2:19
10. "Ripple" (Jerry Garcia, Robert Hunter) – 4:49
11. "Goodnight Irene" (traditional) – 7:04

Disc 2 – Matinee, electric set

1. "How Sweet It Is (To Be Loved by You)" (Brian Holland, Lamont Dozier, Eddie Holland) – 7:11
2. "They Love Each Other (Garcia, Hunter) – 8:22
3. "When I Paint My Masterpiece" (Bob Dylan) – 6:28
4. "Dear Prudence" (John Lennon, Paul McCartney) – 12:03
5. "Run for the Roses" (Garcia, Hunter) – 5:56
6. "I Shall Be Released" (Dylan) – 7:33
7. "My Sisters and Brothers" (Charles Johnson) – 4:34
8. "Midnight Moonlight" (Peter Rowan) – 7:07
9. "Crazy Love" (Van Morrison) – 5:28

Disc 3 – Evening show, acoustic set

1. "Swing Low, Sweet Chariot" (traditional) – 4:01
2. "Deep Elem Blues" (traditional) – 6:39
3. "Blue Yodel #9 (Standing on the Corner)" (Jimmie Rodgers) – 6:15
4. "Ballad of Casey Jones" (Hurt) – 5:56
5. "Two Soldiers" (traditional) – 4:47
6. Band introduction – 0:49
7. "Diamond Joe" (Tex Logan) – 3:52
8. "Gone Home" (Bill Carlisle) – 4:44
9. "Oh, Babe, It Ain't No Lie" (Elizabeth Cotten) – 6:10
10. "If I Lose" (Ralph Stanley) – 3:20
11. "Ragged but Right" (traditional) – 5:08

Disc 4 – Evening show, electric set

1. "Werewolves of London" (LeRoy Marinell, Waddy Wachtel, Warren Zevon) – 6:19
2. "Cats Under the Stars" (Garcia, Hunter) – 7:58
3. "Stop That Train" (Peter Tosh) – 6:41
4. "Let It Rock" (Chuck Berry) – 5:33
5. "Gomorrah" (Garcia, Hunter) – 6:39
6. "The Harder They Come" (Jimmy Cliff) – 10:44
7. "Knockin' on Heaven's Door" (Dylan) – 11:00
8. "Deal" (Garcia, Hunter) – 7:46
9. "My Sisters and Brothers" (Johnson) – 7:32

== Personnel ==
Jerry Garcia Band

- Jerry Garcia – electric guitar, vocals
- Melvin Seals – keyboards
- John Kahn – bass guitar
- David Kemper – drums
- Jaclyn LaBranch – vocals
- Gloria Jones – vocals

Jerry Garcia Acoustic Band

- Jerry Garcia – acoustic guitar, vocals
- David Nelson – acoustic guitar, vocals
- Sandy Rothman – mandolin, dobro, banjo, vocals
- John Kahn – double bass
- Kenny Kosek – fiddle
- David Kemper – snare drum

Production

- Executive producers: Christopher Sabec, Peter McQuaid, Hale Milgrim
- Recording: John Cutler
- Production engineer: Tom Flye
- Second engineer: Robert Gatley
- Mastering: John Cuniberti
- Research and compilation: Blair Jackson, David Gans
- Album coordination: Jeff Adams
- Photography: Herb Greene
