= Setlist: The Very Best of New Riders of the Purple Sage Live =

Compilation album by New Riders of the Purple Sage
- Released: July 12, 2011
- Recorded: 1971, 1973
- Genre: Country rock
- Length: 55:45
- Label: Legacy

New Riders of the Purple Sage chronology
Where I Come From (2009)	Setlist: The Very Best of New Riders of the Purple Sage Live (2011)	Instant Armadillo Blues (2011)

Setlist: The Very Best of New Riders of the Purple Sage Live is an album by the country rock band the New Riders of the Purple Sage. It contains six songs selected from their live album Home, Home on the Road, recorded in 1973 and released in 1974, and six songs recorded live at various venues in 1971. It was released by Legacy Recordings on July 12, 2011.

== Critical reception ==
Professional ratings
Review scores
Source	Rating
Allmusic	3/5 stars

On Allmusic, Al Campbell said, "New Riders of the Purple Sage collectors will be pleased with the unreleased material, but the casual listener should first check out the band's self-titled debut album on Columbia."

== Track listing ==
From Home, Home on the Road:

1. "Henry" (John Dawson) – 4:37
2. "Hello Mary Lou" (Gene Pitney, Cayet Mangiaracina) – 2:55
3. "Dead Flowers" (Mick Jagger, Keith Richards) – 3:59
4. "Truck Drivin' Man" (Terry Fell) – 2:58
5. "Kick in the Head" (Robert Hunter) – 3:10
6. "School Days" (Chuck Berry) – 3:06

Additional tracks:

7. "Portland Woman" (Dawson) – 5:11 – February 27, 1971, Fillmore West, San Francisco, California
8. "Glendale Train" (Dawson) – 5:05 – February 27, 1971, Fillmore West, San Francisco, California
9. "I Don't Know You" (Dawson) – 3:56 – April 29, 1971, Fillmore East, New York City
10. "Louisiana Lady" (Dawson) – 3:35 – August 15, 1971, Berkeley Community Theatre, Berkeley, California
11. "All I Ever Wanted" (Dawson) – 7:10 – April 26, 1971, Fillmore East, New York City
12. "Dirty Business" (Dawson) – 10:03 – February 28, 1971, Fillmore West, San Francisco, California

== Personnel ==
=== New Riders of the Purple Sage ===
- John Dawson – electric guitar, acoustic guitar, vocals
- David Nelson – electric guitar, vocals
- Dave Torbert – bass guitar, vocals
- Buddy Cage – pedal steel guitar on "Henry", "Hello Mary Lou", "Dead Flowers", "Truck Drivin' Man", "Kick in the Head", "School Days"
- Jerry Garcia – pedal steel guitar on "Portland Woman", "Glendale Train", "I Don't Know You", "Louisiana Lady", "All I Ever Wanted", "Dirty Business"
- Spencer Dryden – drums

=== Additional musicians ===
- Andy Stein – saxophone on "School Days"
- David LaFlamme – violin on "Dirty Business"

=== Production ===
- Compilation produced by Jeff Magid
- Mastering: Dave Donnelly
- Art direction and design: Rob Carter
- Photography: Michael Ochs, Urve Kuusik
- Liner notes: Jeff Kaliss
