= Glendale Train =

Live album by New Riders of the Purple Sage
- Released: November 18, 2013
- Recorded: October 30, 1971
- Genre: Country rock
- Length: 75:16
- Label: Smokin' (CD); Let Them Eat Vinyl (LP)

New Riders of the Purple Sage chronology
17 Pine Avenue (2012)	Glendale Train (2013)	Thanksgiving in New York City (2019)

Jerry Garcia chronology
Garcia Live Volume Three (2013)	Glendale Train (2013)	Fall 1989: The Long Island Sound (2013)

Glendale Train is an album by the country rock band the New Riders of the Purple Sage. It was recorded as a live radio broadcast on October 30, 1971 at the Taft Auditorium in Cincinnati, Ohio. It was released on CD and vinyl on November 18, 2013.

The New Riders' complete performance from the concert is included in the album. As was often the case during this period, they were the opening act for the Grateful Dead. Jerry Garcia was a member of both bands. He would play pedal steel guitar for NRPS, and then play electric guitar and sing for the Dead. A Grateful Dead album recorded the following night is Dick's Picks Volume 2.

== Critical reception ==
Professional ratings
Review scores
Source	Rating
Allmusic	3.5/5 stars

On AllMusic, Steve Leggett said, "... at this point, just after the release of the band's self-titled debut album earlier in the year, Garcia was a regular on pedal steel guitar. It was arguably the classic lineup for a band that was initially a spinoff project from the Dead, making this well-recorded live set a historical and archival delight."

== Track listing ==
Side A

1. Introduction by Sam Cutler – 0:28
2. "Workin' Man Blues" (Merle Haggard) – 3:49
3. "Superman" (John Dawson) – 4:00
4. "Down in the Boondocks" (Joe South) – 3:12
5. "Cecilia" (Dawson) – 4:23

Side B

6. "Dim Lights, Thick Smoke (And Loud, Loud Music)" (Joe Maphis, Max Fidler, Rose Lee Maphis) – 4:18
7. "Dirty Business" (Dawson) – 10:41
8. "Truck Drivin' Man" (Terry Fell) – 3:07

Side C

9. "Lochinvar" (Dawson) – 4:51
10. "Hello Mary Lou" (Gene Pitney, Cayet Mangiaracina) – 2:58
11. "The Weight" (Robbie Robertson) – 7:27
12. "Glendale Train" (Dawson) – 4:53

Side D

13. "Lodi" (John Fogerty) – 4:05
14. "Last Lonely Eagle" (Dawson) – 6:33
15. "Louisiana Lady" (Dawson) – 3:57
16. "Willie and the Hand Jive" (Johnny Otis) – 6:28

== Personnel ==
- John Dawson – acoustic guitar, vocals
- David Nelson – electric guitar, vocals
- Dave Torbert – bass, vocals
- Jerry Garcia – pedal steel guitar
- Spencer Dryden – drums
