= Ragged but Right =

Ragged but Right may refer to:

- Ragged but Right (song), a traditional American song dating from the early 1900s recorded by George Jones among others
- Ragged but Right (album), a live album by the Jerry Garcia Acoustic Band recorded in 1987 and released in 2010
