= 17 Pine Avenue =

Studio album by New Riders of the Purple Sage
- Released: March 6, 2012
- Recorded: 2011
- Genre: Country rock
- Length: 59:58
- Label: Woodstock
- Producer: Michael Falzarano

New Riders of the Purple Sage chronology
Instant Armadillo Blues (2011)	17 Pine Avenue (2012)	Glendale Train (2013)

17 Pine Avenue is an album by the country rock band the New Riders of the Purple Sage. It was released on March 6, 2012.

17 Pine Avenue is the New Riders' second studio album, and third album overall, to feature their post-2005 lineup of David Nelson on guitar, Buddy Cage on pedal steel guitar, Michael Falzarano on guitar, Ronnie Penque on bass, and Johnny Markowski on drums. As on the band's previous effort, Where I Come From, the music for seven of the twelve songs was written by Nelson, with lyrics by Robert Hunter, who wrote the lyrics for many Grateful Dead songs.

== Critical reception ==
Professional ratings
Review scores
Source	Rating
Allmusic	3.5/5 stars

On Jambands.com, Brian Robbins wrote, "Listen: if somehow you've missed crossing paths with the New Riders of the Purple Sage since their 2005 renaissance, then you need to understand something. This is not a band of tired, tie-dyed troubadours seeing out their later years, going through the motions and rehashing their greatest hits — these crazy bastards are still full of life; full of fire; full of music. 17 Pine Avenue is the latest round of proof: a killer studio album featuring a dozen cuts that show off the depth of the band's talent and their passion for what they're doing. In short, this is no oldies band, boys and girls — this is a happening thang.... Getting older? Who says? I'll have whatever they're having, barkeep."

On AcousticMusic.com, Mark S. Tucker said, "With 27 albums and 9 compilations under their belt, you could say the New Riders of the Purple Sage have been pretty damn successful, and this latest release, 17 Pine Avenue, does nothing to tarnish that record—in fact pretty much epitomizes what the ensemble has always been about—being a very impressive disc that can still boast the presence of founding members David Nelson and Buddy Cage along with the same three cats who made 2009's Where I Come From a success.... Not a cut here is less than superb, and if there's any justice in the music world, releases like this will serve to reinvigorate the fading cowpunk movement 'cause this one's going to stun listeners in their tracks."

On Allmusic, J. Poet wrote, "Longtime Grateful Dead lyricist Robert Hunter contributes words to seven of the album's 12 tracks, bringing his customary psychedelic sheen to the material.... "Fivio" is a triumphant love song that's a reinvention of the traditional Irish tune popularized by the Clancy Brothers and features Michael Falzarano's chiming guitar and sighing pedal steel by Cage. "Suite at the Mission" is a cryptic meditation on life's vicissitudes full of dark humor; it's marked by more sparkling pedal steel from Cage and a world-weary vocal from Nelson. The title track is a bluesy shuffle crammed with mind-bending images that compares favorably to the Dead classic "Truckin'". It's one of the album's strongest songs and Nelson delivers it with a jaunty, insouciant air."

== Track listing ==
1. "Prisoner of Freedom" (David Nelson, Robert Hunter) – 5:27
2. "Message in a Bottle" (Nelson, Hunter) – 4:02
3. "Fivio" (Nelson, Hunter) – 5:56
4. "Just the Way It Goes" (Michael Falzarano) – 4:27
5. "17 Pine Avenue" (Nelson, Hunter) – 5:14
6. "Down for the Ride" (Johnny Markowski) – 3:56
7. "No Time" (Nelson, Hunter) – 5:32
8. "Shake That Thing" (Ronnie Penque) – 4:47
9. "Suite at the Mission" (Nelson, Hunter) – 7:50
10. "I Know There's Someone Else" (Markowski) – 3:41
11. "Six of One" (Nelson, Hunter) – 4:50
12. "Truth Is Dead" (traditional, arranged by NRPS, lyrics by Falzarano) – 3:31

== Personnel ==
New Riders of the Purple Sage

- David Nelson – guitar, vocals
- Buddy Cage – pedal steel guitar
- Michael Falzarano – guitar, vocals
- Ronnie Penque – bass, vocals
- Johnny Markowski – drums, vocals

Additional musicians

- Professor Louie – Hammond organ on tracks 4, 6, 8, 10, accordion on track 2
- Lizzy Friel – backing vocals on tracks 1, 2, 7, 9
- Christian Cassan – percussion

Production

- Michael Falzarano – producer, mixing
- Bobby Driscoll – executive producer
- Larry Levin – recording
- Brad Kotzmoyer – recording
- Christian Cassan – mixing
- Ed Littman – mastering
- Kevin Morgan – art
- Mike Tut – photo
- Captain Toast – road manager
- ScareKrow – live sound
- DeLacey – stage tech and merchandise
- Rob Bleetstein – band historian
- Blue Mountain Artists – booking agent
