= Only Road Home =

Studio album by Ronnie Penque
- Released: November 2, 2010
- Recorded: 2009, 2010
- Genre: Rock
- Length: 60 minutes
- Label: Bayland
- Producer: Ronnie Penque

Ronnie Penque chronology
| Only Road Home (2010) | Family Business (2019) |

Only Road Home is an album by the American musical artist Ronnie Penque. Penque is best known as the bassist and singer for the New Riders of the Purple Sage. Only Road Home is Penque's first solo album. It was released on November 2, 2010 on the Bayland Records label. The album features 11 songs written and produced by Penque.

In early 2011 Only Road Home made it to the top of the college radio charts in the Jam band category. It climbed to number one in February 2011.

Only Road Home contains a version of the song "Olivia Rose", which was originally recorded by the New Riders of the Purple Sage on their 2009 album Where I Come From.

== Critical reception ==
On jambands.com, Brian Robbins wrote, "Here we find Penque using his time between New Riders gigs to try on many hats – bassist, vocalist, bandleader, songwriter, and producer – and he wears them all well.... His songs on Only Road Home range from entertaining and cryptic tales to feeling like disarmingly open journal entries. Penque is definitely a believer in the songs-come-first-and-the-jams-will-follow school... All in all, Only Road Home is a great effort from a band that doesn't try to deny their influences, but instead treats them as lessons well learned. The Ronnie Penque Band has managed to create that rarest of beasts: both fresh and familiar; both well-crafted and adventurous."

On Sleeping Hedgehog, Deborah Grabien wrote, "With Only Road Home, Ronnie Penque — a killer bassist who happens to play for the New Riders of the Purple Sage — has managed to pull something out of the air, out of the studio, out of time. It's there in the heartfelt lyrics, the clean easy production values, the echoes of pedal steel and the 'hey put your boots up' twang of the lead guitar. It's there in Penque's lead vocals, which somehow evoke touches of Delaney Bramlett and Van Morrison and, yes, Jerry Garcia and John Dawson, while still magically remaining entirely distinct and his own: cheerful, occasionally plaintive, always accessible."

== Track listing ==
All songs written by Ronnie Penque.

1. "Thunder & Lightning" – 4:03
2. "Circles" – 4:40
3. "Olivia Rose" – 5:49
4. "Gonna Roll" – 4:20
5. "One More for Me" – 3:30
6. "Santa Ana Wind" – 4:04
7. "Mallory" – 5:27
8. "Cool November" – 5:39
9. "Little Soul" – 7:00
10. "Only Road Home" – 5:02
11. "American Junkie" – 10:46

== Personnel ==
Ronnie Penque Band=

- Ronnie Penque – bass, vocals
- Andy Trister – lead guitar, acoustic guitar
- Chris Penque – rhythm guitar, acoustic guitar
- Jeff Pearlman – piano, organ, vocals
- Katie Pearlman – drums, percussion, vocals

Additional musicians

- Jimmy Fleming – fiddle, mandolin
- Ivan Funk – pedal steel guitar

Production

- Produced by: Ronnie Penque
- Co-producer: Larry Levin
- Engineers: Larry Levin, Brad Kotzmoyer
- Mix by: Mark McNutt, Larry Levin
- Mastered by: Ed Littman
- Album design: Ronnie Penque, Gina Guarnieri
- Photography and graphics: Gina Guarnieri
