= Thanksgiving in New York City =

Live album by New Riders of the Purple Sage
- Released: November 29, 2019
- Recorded: November 23, 1972
- Venue: Academy of Music; New York City
- Genre: Country rock
- Length: 103:45
- Label: Ominvore
- Producer: Rob Bleetstein

New Riders of the Purple Sage chronology
Glendale Train (2013)	Thanksgiving in New York City (2019)	Bear's Sonic Journals: Dawn of the New Riders of the Purple Sage (2020)

Thanksgiving in New York City is a live album by the country rock band the New Riders of the Purple Sage. It contains the complete concert recorded at the Academy of Music in Manhattan at the late show on November 23, 1972. It was released as a 3-disc LP on November 29, 2019, in a limited edition of 1,800 copies, as part of Record Store Day Black Friday. It was released as a 2-disc CD on December 6, 2019.

== Critical reception ==
In All About Jazz, Doug Collette wrote, "By the time the New Riders appeared at the Academy of Music in November of 1972, commencing what would turn out to be a holiday tradition of sorts in the Big Apple, they had coalesced into a tightly-knit quintet... Two studio releases this same year, Gypsy Cowboy (Columbia, 1972) and Powerglide (Columbia, 1972) had helped crystallize a collective persona for the NRPS: slightly tongue-in-cheek and more than just a little psychedelic.... While this nearly two-hour recording isn't exactly overflowing with presence, the mix is nevertheless clear enough to reveal the potency of the musicians, individually and as a unit."

In Elmore Magazine, Lou Montesano said, "The release of a two-disc recording of the New Riders of the Purple Sage’s 1972 Thanksgiving show at the New York Academy of Music is something to be thankful for. The New Riders, NRPS among their many hard-core fans, have their place in American music as the creators of a psychedelic country rock sound more aligned with the Grateful Dead's bluegrass roots than the high harmonies of the Byrds.... This recording represents the finest lineup of the band’s early years."

Lost Live Dead wrote, "... the '72 band was road tested and battle hardened. They played a wide variety of originals and covers, rocking hard while the melodies soared. By then, Garcia's pedal steel chair had been taken by the great Buddy Cage, and Cage took Garcia's basic melodic template and exploded it into a remarkable kaleidoscope of sweet picking and sharp sustain."

== CD track listing ==
Disc 1

1. "Leaving on Her Mind" (Jack Clement)
2. "Portland Woman" (John Dawson)
3. "Hello Mary Lou" (Gene Pitney, Cayet Mangiaracina)
4. "Sutter's Mill" (Dawson)
5. "She's No Angel" (Wanda Ballman, J.W. Arnold)
6. "Henry" (Dawson)
7. "Contract" (Dave Torbert)
8. "Linda" (Dawson)
9. "Take a Letter Maria" (R. B. Greaves)
10. "I Don't Know You" (Dawson)
11. "All I Ever Wanted" (Dawson)
12. "Groupie" (Torbert)
13. "Whiskey" (Dawson)

Disc 2

1. "Long Black Veil" (Marijohn Wilkin, Danny Dill)
2. "Lochinvar" (Dawson)
3. "Truck Drivin' Man" (Terry Fell)
4. "Rainbow" (Dawson)
5. "I Don't Need No Doctor" (Nick Ashford, Valerie Simpson, Jo Armstead)
6. "Louisiana Lady" (Dawson)
7. "Honky Tonk Women" (Mick Jagger, Keith Richards)
8. "Last Lonely Eagle" (Dawson)
9. "Willie and the Hand Jive" (Johnny Otis)

== Personnel ==
New Riders of the Purple Sage

- John Dawson – guitar, vocals
- David Nelson – guitar, vocals
- Dave Torbert – bass, vocals
- Buddy Cage – pedal steel guitar
- Spencer Dryden – drums

Additional musicians

- David Rea – guitar on "I Don't Need No Doctor", "Willie and the Hand Jive"

Production

- Produced by Rob Bleetstein
- Recording: Bill Culhane
- Mastering: David Glasser
- Cover art: Kevin Morgan Studio
- Photos: Lynn Silverman, Larry Rogers
- Design, layout: Greg Allen
- Liner notes: Rob Bleetstein
