= Where I Come From (New Riders of the Purple Sage album) =

Studio album by New Riders of the Purple Sage
- Released: June 2, 2009
- Recorded: 2008
- Genre: Country rock
- Length: 73:26; Bonus disc – 66:02
- Label: Woodstock
- Producer: Michael Falzarano

New Riders of the Purple Sage chronology
Very Best of the Relix Years (2009)	Where I Come From (2009)	Setlist: The Very Best of New Riders of the Purple Sage Live (2011)

Where I Come From is the fourteenth studio album by the American country rock band the New Riders of the Purple Sage. It was recorded in 2008, and released on the Woodstock Records label on June 2, 2009.

Following Wanted: Live at Turkey Trot, Where I Come From was the second album recorded by the New Riders after they re-formed in 2005, with band co-founder David Nelson on guitar, long-time member Buddy Cage on pedal steel guitar, Hot Tuna alumnus Michael Falzarano on guitar, Ronnie Penque on bass, and Johnny Markowski on drums. It was the band's first studio album in 17 years, since 1992's Midnight Moonlight.

The music for seven of the songs on the album was written by David Nelson, with lyrics by Robert Hunter, who wrote the lyrics for many Grateful Dead songs. Four of the other five songs were also written by current band members. In 2010, a version of the song "Olivia Rose", written by Ronnie Penque, appeared on his album Only Road Home.

The cover of Where I Come From was illustrated by Stanley Mouse, an artist known for his many concert posters and album covers.

Some copies of the album were accompanied by a bonus disc called Where I Come From: Radio Mixes & Live Bonus.

== Critical reception ==
Professional ratings
Review scores
Source	Rating
Allmusic	3.5/5 stars
Glide Magazine	3/5 stars
Grateful Web	(not rated)
Jambands.com	(not rated)
KindWeb	(not rated)
Marin Independent Journal	(not rated)

On Allmusic, William Ruhlmann wrote, "But the heart of the album — seven songs out of 12 — is the work of the new songwriting team of Nelson and Robert Hunter.... Hunter comes up with his typically aphoristic, imagistic, and vernacular words (particularly on the title song) and Nelson matches them with catchy, country-tinged melodies that the band plays in frisky country-rock roadhouse arrangements. This may be San Francisco music, but Bakersfield doesn't seem far away as the guitars go twangy and Cage plays down the weepy side of the pedal steel in favor of something more stinging. These New Riders jam a bit more than the original ensemble, and they also rock a bit more."

On Jambands.com, Brian Robbins said, "Forget the 40 years of history; forget the dues paid and the groundwork laid for what came to be known as the jamband scene; forget the family tree whose roots are tightly entwined with those of the Dead; just forget all that stuff and throw on a copy of the New Riders of the Purple Sage Where I Come From. Pretend it's the debut album from a new band and listen. Just listen. You know what? It's good, damn good as a matter of fact. No need to give anyone a free ride based on their laurels; the New Riders are making some of the best music of their career. This is no oldies act. Kids, you want songs? You got em. You want jams? You got those, too."

In Glide magazine, Doug Collette wrote, "Fronted by David Nelson on guitar and vocals with Buddy Cage on pedal steel, the chemistry of the current NRPS goes further than just the band personnel. Robert Hunter collaborates with Nelson on a half dozen cuts and the long-time Grateful Dead lyricist demonstrates an elegant command of language on the title song, while the band's playing on a close to eight minute track is articulate in its own way.... NRPS 2009 can excel when they improvise, as on the ten-minute plus of 'Ghost Train Blues', and the group would do well to jam more often and bring in more cover material, such as the traditional 'Them Old Minglewood Blues', to complement their originals."

== Track listing ==
=== Where I Come From ===
1. "Where I Come From" (David Nelson, Robert Hunter) – 7:40
2. "Big Six" (Nelson, Hunter) – 4:16
3. "Barracuda Moon" (Nelson, Hunter) – 7:56
4. "Higher" (Johnny Markowski, Bobby Driscoll) – 6:00
5. "Down the Middle" (Nelson, Hunter) – 5:33
6. "Them Old Minglewood Blues" (traditional, arranged by Nelson) – 5:01
7. "Something in the Air Tonight" (Michael Falzarano) – 3:56
8. "Olivia Rose" (Ronnie Penque) – 5:23
9. "Blues Barrel" (Nelson, Hunter) – 5:58
10. "Ghost Train Blues" (Nelson, Hunter) – 10:36
11. "Carl Perkins Wears the Crown" (Falzarano) – 4:33
12. "Rockin' with Nona" (Nelson, Hunter) – 6:57

=== Where I Come From: Radio Mixes & Live Bonus ===
1. "Where I Come From (Nelson, Hunter) – 4:20 – radio mix
2. "Barracuda Moon" (Nelson, Hunter) – 4:09 – radio mix
3. "Higher" (Markowski, Driscoll) – 4:16 – radio mix
4. "Pour House Jelly" with Professor Louie (New Riders of the Purple Sage) – 4:30 – sound check at The Pour House, 9/18/07
5. "Let It Grow" with Professor Louie (Falzarano) – 12:33 – sound check at Shawnee Cave, 9/30/06
6. "Louisiana Lady" (John Dawson) – 5:04 – recorded live at Turkey Trot, 7/30/06
7. "Peggy-O" (traditional, arranged by Nelson) – 6:12 – recorded live at Turkey Trot, 7/30/06
8. "Truck Driving Man" (Buck Owens) – 6:23 – recorded live at Turkey Trot, 7/30/06
9. "Dirty Business" (Dawson) – 18:08 – recorded live at Turkey Trot, 7/30/06

== Personnel ==
=== New Riders of the Purple Sage ===
- David Nelson – guitar, vocals
- Buddy Cage – pedal steel guitar
- Michael Falzarano – guitar, vocals
- Ronnie Penque – bass, vocals
- Johnny Markowski – drums, vocals

=== Additional musicians ===
- Mookie Siegel – keyboards on tracks 4, 5, 8, 11, and 12
- Christian Cassan – percussion on tracks 2, 4, 5, 7, and 9

=== Production ===
- Michael Falzarano – producer
- Stanley Mouse – cover illustration
- Kevin Morgan – band illustration and layout
- Christian Cassan and Michael Falzarano – mixing
- Ed Littman – mastering
- Captain Toast – road manager
- ScareKrow and LT – crew
