= Citizen Kafka =

American radio personality

Citizen Kafka (also known as Sid Kafka and The Citizen) was the stage name of New York-based radio personality and folk musician Richard Shulberg (November 20, 1947, Brooklyn, New York – March 14, 2009).

Beginning in the late 1970s and continuing through much of the 1990s, Citizen Kafka produced and hosted a number of radio programs on Pacifica Foundation's WBAI-FM in New York, presenting an eclectic range of live and recorded music, comedy and poetry. One such program was the monthly "Citizen Kafka Show", which Kafka co-created in 1979 with then-unknown actor John Goodman and musician Kenny Kosek. The Citizen Kafka Show, which ran during much of the 1980s, featured live improvisational sketch comedy by Goodman and Kosek along with music DJ'd by Kafka.

Kafka later co-hosted a program with Pat Conte called The Secret Museum of the Air, which ran on WBAI from 1990 to 1996. This show presented unusual music from various genres and cultures, most of it recorded before 1948. Kafka and Conte moved the show to WFMU, 91.1 FM in 1997. Archived shows, comprising hundred of hours from The Secret Museum, are available here: http://www.wfmu.org/playlists/SM

Parallel to his long radio career, Citizen Kafka also performed actively as a bluegrass musician. This included a stint as a leader of perennial New York bluegrass band the Wretched Refuse String Band.
