= Family Business (Ronnie Penque album) =

Studio album by Ronnie Penque
- Released: August 30, 2019
- Studios: The Jam Room Music Complex, Howell, New Jersey
- Genre: Rock
- Length: 49:26
- Label: Bayland
- Producer: Ronnie Penque

Ronnie Penque chronology
| Only Road Home (2010) | Family Business (2019) |

Family Business is an album by Ronnie Penque. His second solo album, it was released on August 30, 2019.

Ronnie Penque is a singer, songwriter, and musician. He is perhaps best known for playing bass guitar in the band New Riders of the Purple Sage. The musicians on Family Business include NRPS members Buddy Cage, David Nelson, Michael Falzarano, and Johnny Markowski, along with other like-minded musical artists such as Mark Karan and Mookie Siegel.

== Critical reception ==
In the Asbury Park Press, Alex Biese wrote, "The album, recorded at the Jam Room Music Complex in Howell, is a lush, 10-track survey of the jammier side of American music, from the adventurous anthem "Wookie Kids" to the lush and tender ballad "Wondering" and the country-rock shimmer of "Emma Lynn". Half the album has the distinct, shining presence of Penque's New Riders bandmate Buddy Cage on pedal steel guitar."

== Track listing ==
All songs written by Ronnie Penque except where noted.

1. "Crawford" – 4:04
2. "Midnight Medicine" (Penque, Deborah Grabien) – 5:35
3. "Wookie Kids" (Penque, Michael Falzarano) – 6:54
4. "Emma Lynn" – 3:15
5. "Wondering" – 6:12
6. "Shave That Rock" – 5:41
7. "Will I See You Tonight" – 3:16
8. "The Fugitive" (Casey Anderson, Liz Anderson) – 3:12
9. "Wish You Luck" – 6:08
10. "That's All" – 5:01

== Personnel ==
Musicians

- Ronnie Penque – bass guitar, acoustic guitar, 12-string acoustic guitar, lead vocals
- Arnie Brown – electric guitar, vocals
- Buddy Cage – pedal steel guitar
- Clay Cassell – drums, percussion
- Mark Diomede – electric guitar
- Michael Falzarano – electric guitar, acoustic guitar
- Mike Flynn – acoustic guitar, electric guitar, lap steel guitar
- Kenny Harten – fiddle
- Mark Karan – electric guitar
- Sandy Mack – harmonica
- Johnny Markowski – drums
- David Nelson – electric guitar, vocals
- Jeff Pearlman – piano, organ, vocals
- Katie Pearlman – drums, vocals
- Chris Penque – electric guitar, electric slide guitar
- James Saluzzi – electric guitar, vocals
- Mookie Siegel – organ, accordion
- Drave Taylor – piano, organ

Production

- Produced by Ronnie Penque
- Mixing: Arnie Brown, Ronnie Penque
- Mastering: Dennis Drake
- Additional recording: Peter Francovilla
- Design: Ronnie Penque, Russ Paladino
- Photography: Bob Minkin, Suzy Perler, Vernon Webb, JM Hartl
