= Jerry Garcia Acoustic Band =

Band (1987–1988)

- Origin: San Francisco, California, USA
- Genres: Folk, bluegrass
- Years active: 1987–1988
- Label: Grateful Dead
- Spinoff of: Grateful Dead; Jerry Garcia Band
- Past members: Jerry Garcia; David Nelson; Sandy Rothman; John Kahn; Kenny Kosek; David Kemper
- Website: jerrygarcia.com

The Jerry Garcia Acoustic Band (JGAB) was a band formed by Jerry Garcia of the Grateful Dead. They played a number of concerts in 1987 and 1988, and subsequently released two live albums.

== Band members ==
- Jerry Garcia - guitar, vocals
- David Nelson - guitar, vocals
- Sandy Rothman - mandolin, dobro, banjo, vocals
- John Kahn - bass
- Kenny Kosek - fiddle
- David Kemper - drums

== History ==
Garcia and Rothman had played together in The Black Mountain Boys, a bluegrass band. The JGAB formed in 1987 and made their first public appearance at The Fillmore on March 18, 1987, at a benefit concert for Artist Rights Today.

The JGAB played the Lunt-Fontanne Theatre for a two-week Broadway run, then continued with appearances at The Warfield in San Francisco and the Wiltern Theatre in Los Angeles. Other performances included the Electric on the Eel concert, the Creating a Better Future benefit in Marin County, California, as well as appearances at the Cotati Cabaret (an exclusive club in Sonoma County, California), and the Frost Amphitheater at Stanford University.

== Discography ==
- Almost Acoustic – 1988
- Pure Jerry: Lunt-Fontanne, New York City, October 31, 1987 – two CDs by the Jerry Garcia Band and two CDs by the Jerry Garcia Acoustic Band – 2004
- Pure Jerry: Lunt-Fontanne, New York City, The Best of the Rest, October 15–30, 1987 – two CDs by the Jerry Garcia Band and one CD by the Jerry Garcia Acoustic Band – 2004
- Ragged but Right – 2010
- On Broadway: Act One – October 28th, 1987 – two CDs by the Jerry Garcia Acoustic Band and one CD by the Jerry Garcia Band – 2015
- Electric on the Eel – six CDs by the Jerry Garcia Band and one CD bonus disc by the Jerry Garcia Acoustic Band – 2019

== Selection of songs performed ==
- Swing Low Sweet Chariot
- Diamond Joe
- I'm Here To Get My Baby Out Of Jail
- Deep Elem Blues
- I'm Troubled
- Oh, The Wind and Rain
- Oh Babe, It Ain't No Lie
- Ripple
- I've Been All Around This World
- The Girl At The Crossroads Bar
- The Ballad of Casey Jones (A song written by Mississippi John Hurt, not to be confused with the Grateful Dead's own song "Casey Jones")
- Gone Home
- Blue Yodel
- Spike Driver Blues
- Trouble In Mind
- I Ain't Never
- Short Life Of Trouble
- Ragged But Right
- Drifting With The Tide
- Rosa Lee McFall
- Two Soldiers
- If I Lose
- Bright Morning Star
- Goodnight Irene
- (It's A Long, Long Way) To The Top Of The World
- Drifting Too Far From The Shore
- Turtle Dove
- Ashes Of Love
- Poison Love
- Friend Of The Devil
- Little Sadie
