= Kenny Kosek =

American bluegrass fiddler

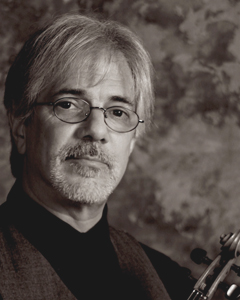
- Kenny Kosek

Background information
- Born: 1949 (age 76–77); The Bronx, New York, U.S.
- Genres: Bluegrass, country, folk, klezmer
- Occupation: Musician
- Instrument: Fiddle
- Years active: 1970s–present
- Website: kennykosek.com

Kenny Kosek (born 1949 in The Bronx, New York), is an American fiddler who plays bluegrass, country, klezmer, folk music and roots music. In addition to his solo career, he has performed with many other well-known performers and contributed to film and television soundtrack music. He is also a musical educator. He is a graduate of the Bronx High School of Science and City College of New York.

== Influences and performing career ==
Kenny Kosek's early musical influences included Clark Kessinger, Vassar Clements, The New Lost City Ramblers, Kenny Baker and the May Brothers – Andy and Henry. While attending college, he played with The Star Spangled String Band and The Livingstone Cowboys, and freelanced in the Bleecker Street folk scene. His first post-collegiate professional work was as a member of the David Bromberg Band, and with a short-lived rock band, White Cloud, led by legendary hipster producer Thomas Jefferson Kaye. With Citizen Kafka and John Goodman, he wrote for and performed in the Citizen Kafka Show, a monthly improv and sketch comedy show that ran on WBAI-FM in New York City through the 1980s, and as "Johnny Angry Red Weltz" was part of Citizen Kafka's influential newgrass group, the Wretched Refuse String Band. He is similarly a part of Margot Leverett's fusion quintet The Klezmer Mountain Boys.

== Career in music ==
In the early 1970s, Kenny Kosek was a member of the progressive bluegrass band Country Cooking with Peter Wernick and Tony Trischka on banjo, Russ Barenberg on guitar. On their first album (14 Bluegrass Instrumentals, 1971) John Miller plays bass, and Harry Gilmore mandolin. On their second album (1972), the band played with veteran mandolinist Frank Wakefield, and was later joined by Andy Statman (mandolin, saxophone, percussion) for the third album (Barrel of Fun, 1974), with Nondi Leonard doing the vocals on these last two albums. In 1974, Russ Barenberg recorded a solo guitar album with the other members of Country Cooking (Greg Root on mandolin). Tony Trischka and Peter Wernick went their separate ways, but Kenny Kosek accompanied them on their first albums, and would continue to play occasionally with Tony Trischka for the next fifty years.

Between 1976 and 1978, Kenny Kosek joined banjoist Bill Keith, with whom he recorded an album in the USA (Something Auld, Something Newgrass, Something Borrowed, Something Bluegrass, Rounder, 1976) and an album in France (with Jim Collier, Hexagone, 1978). While in France, he also played some fiddle parts on French banjo player Jean-Marie Redon's first solo album, banjoistiquement votre, and performed at the 1978 International Folk Festival in Courville-sur-Eure, France, both with Bill Keith and Jim Collier, and with his former fellow musicians Tony Trischka and Russ Barenberg, as well as with French mandolin player Christian Seguret and bassist Lionel Wendling, who joined the two bands.

From the mid-1970s onwards, Kenny Kosek also worked as a studio musician, recording with Steve Goodman (1976), Chaka Khan (en), James Taylor (1985), David Byrne (1990), Boy George, Willie Nelson, Tom Chapin, Doug Sahm, Leonard Cohen, and John Denver. He performed with the Late Night Band on the Late Night with David Letterman and at Sting's annual benefit concert for the rainforests at Carnegie Hall.

In the eighties, Kenny Kosek replaced Richard Greene on the fiddle in the "New Blue Velvet Band", with Jim Rooney, Eric Weissberg and Bill Keith, to tour major folk festivals in Canada, continental Europe, Great Britain, Ireland and the northeastern United States. On October 15, 1987, the Jerry García Acoustic Band began a series of concerts on Broadway. Bluegrass multi-instrumentalist Sandy Rothman, a long-time friend of Jerry Garcia, was also a friend of Kenny Kosek, who was invited to join the band. After a fortnight of concerts in New York, the Jerry García Acoustic Band returned to California for more concerts at the end of 1987, where they recorded two albums, the first released at the end of 1988, and the second in 2011, twenty-two years later. This short collaboration helped Kenny Kosek to make a name for himself beyond studio and bluegrass circles, particularly with the Deadhead (fans of the Grateful Dead). The New York recordings were released in 2004 and 2015, together with the electric recordings of the Jerry Garcia Band.

In 2001, Klezmer clarinettist Margot Leverett founded the band Margot Leverett and the Klezmer Mountain Boys, which fuses klezmer and bluegrass styles. The band is made up of Kenny Kosek, Barry Mitterhoff (mandolin, guitar), Joe Selly (guitar) and Marty Confurius (bass). Margot Leverett and the Klezmer Mountain Boys has released two albums: a self-titled album in 2002 and an album entitled Second Avenue Square Dance. The band was featured by the Paul Taylor Dance Company in a piece entitled "Klezmerbluegrass". At the end of 2005 (November–December), he took part, a guitar and fiddle player, in the Broadway show (Promenade Theatre) : Almost Heaven: The Songs of John Denver.

His distinctive roots-music-inspired sound has been part of the soundtracks of many documentaries including The Way West, The Donner Party, Harlan County, U.S.A., The High Lonesome Sound, and the television shows Another World (NBC), The Guiding Light (CBS), and The Kirby Kids (Fox).

In 2024, Kenny Kosek released Twisted Sage (Shefa Records), a set of fifteen fiddle tracks recorded over ten years ago (mostly between 2013 and 2017), most of them with banjo player Tony Trischka. A few other close friends are occasionally involved: Andy Statman on mandolin, banjo player Marty Cutler and guitar player Mark Cosgrove. There are many traditional tunes, but also a handful of original works by Kenny Kosek. According to Donald Teplyske:

Many of these songs are, naturally, 'traditional' fiddle tunes, fiddle and banjo tunes, stringband tunes…but they are presented here having filtered through decades of influence and experimentation, not to mention Kosek and Trischka's years of playing and interpretation. This music is foundational to roots and Americana sounds, but is not stuck in a mythical past where music is pure and unchanged from the 1800s

Kenny Kosek said:

It really is a return to more traditional kind of thing, even though there are pieces on Twisted Sage that are not traditional. There's a klezmer tune that I learned from Andy Statman that gets pretty crazy. And there's some more adventurous stuff. But overall, it's coming from basically a fiddle and banjo format, and returning to stuff that I was doing in the '60s.(...) Over the course of my career, I've been associated with people that have done some very innovative, daring kind of stuff. Tony Trischka and Andy Statman come to mind. And our little band was pushing all kinds of envelopes. So this does have a certain return to my roots in a way. That's true.

== As a musical educator ==
Kosek is deeply involved with music education. His musical instruction videos Learning Country Fiddle, Learning Bluegrass Fiddle, and Bluegrass Classics are available from Homespun Tapes and Videos. He has been a guest instructor at the Falun Folk Festival, Sweden, Tonder, Denmark Festival, the Sore Fingers Music camp, Cotswolds, England, the Big Apple Bluegrass Festival (1998–2002), and the Rathcoole, Ireland Folk Arts Festival (2004). He is a staff instructor in country fiddle at the Turtle Bay Music School in New York City. With Stacy Phillips, he co-authored Bluegrass Fiddle Styles, sometimes called the "yellow Bible" of bluegrass.

== Stage and film performances ==
In addition to performing music, Kosek has appeared in many dramatic productions: in the movies They All Laughed and The Stepford Wives; on Broadway, in The Robber Bridegroom, Platinum, Play Me A Country Song, Foxfire, Big River, Jerry Garcia on Broadway and Footloose; and off-Broadway, in Feast Here Tonight, Das Barbecü, That and the Cup of Tea, A Celtic Christmas, Lost Highway, and Picon Pie.

== Humor ==
Kosek is also known as a humorist; he has written for the National Lampoon, contributed to numerous radio programs, and written liner notes for many fellow performers.

== Discography ==
=== Solo albums ===
- Hasty Lonesome (with Matt Glaser, Rounder Records 0127, 1980)
- Angelwood (Rounder Records CD 0362, 1997)
- Twisted Sage (with Tony Trischka, Shefa Records, CD SHF3011.2, 2004)

=== Permanent member of a Bluegrass band ===
- Country Cooking- 14 Bluegrass Instrumentals (Rounder Records 0006, 1971)
- Frank Wakefield Frank Wakefieled with Country Cooking (Rounder Records – 0007, 1972)
- Country Cooking- Barrel of Fun (Rounder Records 0033, 1974)
- Russ Barenberg, Country Cooking Bluegrass Guitar (Music Minus One – MMO 185, 1974)
- Tony Trischka Early Years (Rounder Records CD 11578 1998 - KK : fiddle, piano) - Compilation of Bluegrass Light (Rounder Records – 0048, 1973) et Heartlands (Rounder Records – 0062, 1975)
- Country Cooking With The Fiction Brothers (Flying Fish FF019, 1976)
- Breakfast Special (Rounder Records 3012, 1977)
- Welcome to Wretched Refuse (Betrayal Records, 1977)
- Bill Keith, Something Auld, Something Newgrass, Something Borrowed, Something Bluegrass (Rounder Records 0084, 1976(LP), 1998(CD))
- Bill Keith & Jim Collier (Hexagone 883 020, 1978 (LP), 199 742, (CD))

=== Membre du Jerry Garcia Acoustic Band ===
- Almost Acoustic – Jerry Garcia Acoustic Band (Grateful Dead Records, 1988)
- Pure Jerry: Lunt-Fontanne, New York City, October 31, 1987 – Jerry Garcia Acoustic Band (Jerry Made Records, 2004)
- Pure Jerry: Lunt-Fontanne, New York City, The Best of the Rest, October 15–30, 1987 – Jerry Garcia Acoustic Band (Jerry Made Records, 2004)
- Ragged but Right – Jerry Garcia Acoustic Band (Jerry Made Records, 2010)

=== Klezmer Mountain Boys ===
- Margot Leverett & The Klezmer Mountain Boys (Traditional Crossroads Records CD 4318, 2003)
- Margot Leverett & The Klezmer Mountain Boys 2nd Avenue Square Dance(Traditional Crossroads Records CD4339, 2003)

=== Occasional participation in Folk, Bluegrass & Klezmer recordings ===
- Roger Sprung, Hal Wylie & the Progressive Bluegrassers Bluegrass blast : a mixed bag of ol' timey music, (Folkways Records – FTS 31038, 1974)
- Hazel Dickens et Alice Gerrard Working Girl Blues (Rounder Records 0054, 1976 (LP) : 2,3,9 (CD 1998 ):tracks 3,4,10 )
- Jack Tottle Back Road Mandolin ( Rounder Records 0067, 1976)
- Red Allen, Don Reno and Frank Wakefield The Berkshire Mountains Bluegrass Festival 1976 (Released in 1985 : The Berkshire Mountains Bluegrass Festival Vol.2, Pigeon Roost Records – PR 0001 : track C5)
- Tom Paxton Heroes (Vanguard – VSD 79411, 1978)
- Jean Marie Redon Banjoistiquement Votre, (Cezame CEZ 1049, 1979 : tracks 1,2,4–6,8,12)
- Andy Statman Flatbush Waltz - Bluegrass & Klezmer (Rounder Records/Trio Records AW-2086 1981 :tracks 1–3, 5)
- Tony Trischka, Bill Keith & Béla Fleck Fiddle Tunes For Banjo (Rounder Records 0124, 1981, CD 0124 1999 :tracks 2,6,9,13,15)
- Christian Séguret Blue Shades (Ada Production – ADA 1004, 1983 : tracks 2,3,6)
- Bill Keith, Banjoistics (Rounder Records – 0148, 1984 : tracks 1–6, 8, 10)
- Andy Statman Nashville Mornings New York Nights (Rounder Records 0174, 1986)
- Andy Statman Andy's Rambles (Rounder Records, CD 0244, 1994)
- Peter Rowan and the Wild Stallions, (Appaloosa, Italie, AP 016, 1982 (LP) 1994 (CD): tracks 5, 10, 11)
- Kenny Kosek Weird Nightmare (Meditations On Mingus) (track 13 - Open Letter To Duke) with Tony Trischka, Bobby Previte, Barry Mitterhoff, Howard Levy, Susan Evans, Bob Stewart (1992)
- Tony Trischka World Turning (Rounder Records CD 0294, 1995 duet on track 7)
- Luboš Malina Piece Of Cake (Compass Records 7 4263 2, 1998 tracks 1, 12)
- Compilation: Song Of The Hills: Appalachian Classics (Shanachie 6041, 1999, track 5 : Footprints In The Snow, instrumental version with Bill Keith, Tony Trischka, Eric Weissberg, Stacy Phillips, Molly Mason)
- Tom Chapin Common Ground (Gadfly Records – 271, 2001)
- James Reams & The Barnstormers Barnstormin (Copper Creek Records CCCD-0195, 2001, tracks: 1, 3, 5, 7, 9–12, 15))
- Stacy Phillips – From The Inside (Archduke Combine, SP6997, 2002, tracks 2–3, 7, 10–11, 14)
- Ben Freed Suite for Bluegrass Banjo (2003: tracks 2–5, 7–8, 12)
- Mark Cosgrove Sweet Reason (FGM Records FGM-119, 2005)
- The Binyomin Ginzberg Trio – Purim Sameach (Jewishmusician.com JML201CD, 2005)
- Kassie DePaiva I Want To Love You (5 Points Records FPT0137, CD 2007, tracks: 6, 8, 11–13)
- Ben Freed Banjopolis (2007: tracks 2–3, 6,9, )
- Ben Freed American Idle (2011:track 7)
- Kenny Kosek Dear Jean: Artists Celebrate Jean Ritchie (track 22 - Last Old Train's a-Leavin') with Peter Pickow, Jon Pickow (Compass Records – 7 4631 2 2014: CD2,4)
- Leslie Evers – I Can't Remember My Dreams (Cumulus Records CR-0106 CD 2014)

=== Some of the references as a session musician ===
- David Bromberg Demon in Disguise (Columbia Records, 1972: tracks 1, 7, 9)
- Loudon Wainwright III - Album III (Columbia Records – KC 31462, 1972, as member of White Cloud)
- Doug Sahm and Band (Atlantic SD 7254, 1973: tracks 1,7)
- Steve Goodman Words We Can Dance To (Asylum Records – 7E-1061, 1976: tracks 4,8)
- Chaka Khan Chaka Khan (Warner Bros. Records 92.3729-1, 1982: tracks 3,4)
- James Taylor That's Why I'm Here (Columbia Records, 1985 : tracks 7,10)
- Laura Cantrell When The Roses Bloom Again (Diesel Only Records DO7005 2002, track 10: eponymous)
- Various artists: A Very Special Acoustic Christmas, Lost Highway, B0001038-02, 2003 (track 3- Willie Nelson, Please Come Home For Christmas)
- Elaine Silver Lady Of The Lake (Silver Stream Music SSM-0010, 2006, tracks 4, 10–11)

== Publications ==
- Stacy Phillips et Kenny Kosek, Bluegrass Fiddle Styles, AMSCO Music, 1992, 112 pages, ISBN 978-0825601859
- Kenny Kosek, Bluegrass And Country Fiddle, Homespun, 2003, 37 pages ISBN 978-0634059162
