= S.U.N.Y., Stonybrook, NY, 3/17/73 =

Live album by New Riders of the Purple Sage
- Released: November 13, 2007
- Recorded: March 17, 1973
- Genre: Country rock
- Label: Kufala
- Producer: Rob Bleetstein

New Riders of the Purple Sage chronology
Cactus Juice (2006)	S.U.N.Y., Stonybrook, NY, 3/17/73 (2007)	Wanted: Live at Turkey Trot (2007)

Professional ratings
Review scores
Source	Rating
Allmusic	3.5/5 stars

S.U.N.Y., Stonybrook, NY, 3/17/73 is an album by the country rock band the New Riders of the Purple Sage. It was recorded live on March 17, 1973, at Stony Brook University. It was released on November 13, 2007. It was the fifth complete New Riders concert that was recorded in the 1970s and released in the 2000s as an album on the Kufala Recordings label.

The New Riders performed two sets of music that night, as usual during that period. They played 29 songs, a combination of originals and covers. Folk singer Ramblin' Jack Elliot sat in with NRPS for their encore – the Rolling Stones tunes "Connection" and "Honky Tonk Women".

The photo of the band on the album cover, by Chuck Pulin, was taken on or about the date of the S.U.N.Y. show. Pictured from left to right are the "classic" early 1970s lineup — Dave Torbert, John "Marmaduke" Dawson, Spencer Dryden, David Nelson, and Buddy Cage.

== Track listing ==
=== Disc one ===
First set:

1. "Amazing Grace" tuneup / Introduction
2. "Teardrops in My Eyes" (Red Allen, Tommy Sutton)
3. "One Too Many Stories" (John Dawson)
4. "Take a Letter Maria" (R. B. Greaves)
5. "School Days" (Chuck Berry)
6. "Portland Woman" (Dawson)
7. "It's Alright with Me" (Dave Torbert)
8. "Rainbow" (Dawson)
9. "Hello Mary Lou" (Gene Pitney, Cayet Mangiaracina)
10. "Lochinvar" (Dawson)
11. "She's No Angel" (Wanda Ballman, J.W. Arnold)
12. "You Should Have Seen Me Runnin'" (Dawson)
13. "Long Black Veil" (Danny Dill, Marijohn Wilkin)
14. "Truck Drivin' Man" (Terry Fell)
15. "Contract" (Torbert)
16. "Sweet Lovin' One" (Dawson)

Second set:

17. "Groupie" (Torbert)
18. "Sutter's Mill" (Dawson)
19. "I Don't Need No Doctor" (Jo Armstead, Nick Ashford, Valerie Simpson)

=== Disc two ===
1. "Henry" (Dawson)
2. "Crazy Arms" (Ralph Mooney, Charles Seals)
3. "Glendale Train" (Dawson)
4. "All I Ever Wanted" (Dawson)
5. "Whiskey" (Dawson)
6. Who Likes "Louie Louie"?
7. "California Day" (Torbert)
8. "Louisiana Lady" (Dawson)
9. "Dim Lights, Thick Smoke (And Loud, Loud Music)" (Max Fidler, Joe Maphis, Rose Lee Maphis)
10. "Willie and the Hand Jive" (Johnny Otis)

Encore:

11. "Connection" (Mick Jagger, Keith Richards)
12. "Honky Tonk Women" (Jagger, Richards)

== Personnel ==
=== New Riders of the Purple Sage ===
- John Dawson – rhythm guitar, vocals
- David Nelson – lead guitar, vocals
- Dave Torbert – bass guitar, vocals
- Buddy Cage – pedal steel guitar
- Spencer Dryden – drums, percussion

=== Additional musicians ===
- Ramblin' Jack Elliott – guitar, vocals on "Connection" and "Honky Tonk Women"

=== Production ===
- Rob Bleetstein – producer
- Bill Culhane – recording
- Stephen Barncard – mastering
- Chuck Pulin – cover photo
