= Pure Jerry: Lunt-Fontanne, New York City, The Best of the Rest, October 15–30, 1987 =

2004 live album

Live album by Jerry Garcia Band and Jerry Garcia Acoustic Band
- Released: November 2004
- Recorded: October 15–30, 1987
- Genres: Rock, rhythm and blues, folk
- Length: 169:25
- Label: Jerry Made

Jerry Garcia Band chronology
Pure Jerry: Lunt-Fontanne, New York City, October 31, 1987 (2004)	Pure Jerry: Lunt-Fontanne, New York City, The Best of the Rest, October 15–30, 1987 (2004)	Pure Jerry: Merriweather Post Pavilion, September 1 & 2, 1989 (2005)

Jerry Garcia Acoustic Band chronology
Pure Jerry: Lunt-Fontanne, New York City, October 31, 1987 (2004)	Pure Jerry: Lunt-Fontanne, New York City, The Best of the Rest, October 15–30, 1987 (2004)	Ragged but Right (2010)

Jerry Garcia chronology
Pure Jerry: Lunt-Fontanne, New York City, October 31, 1987 (2004)	Pure Jerry: Lunt-Fontanne, New York City, The Best of the Rest, October 15–30, 1987 (2004)	Pure Jerry: Keystone Berkeley, September 1, 1974 (2004)

Pure Jerry: Lunt-Fontanne, New York City, The Best of the Rest, October 15–30, 1987 is a three-CD live album by Jerry Garcia. It features performances by both the Jerry Garcia Band and the Jerry Garcia Acoustic Band. It contains selections from a series of 18 concerts performed at the Lunt-Fontanne Theatre in New York City in October 1987. The third in the Pure Jerry series of archival concert albums, it was released in November 2004.

The Jerry Garcia Band was Jerry Garcia's main side project from 1975 to 1995 when he was not playing with the Grateful Dead. Reflecting Garcia's wide-ranging musical interests, they played an eclectic mix of rock and rhythm and blues. The Jerry Garcia Acoustic Band, on the other hand, only existed from the summer of 1987 to the summer of 1988. They played folk, bluegrass, and Americana songs. In the second half of October 1987, the two bands played a series of concerts at the Lunt-Fontanne Theatre in Midtown Manhattan. At each show, the acoustic band would play a first set of music, and the electric band would play a second set.

The second and third entries in the Pure Jerry series of live albums, released simultaneously in November 2004, document these concerts. Pure Jerry: Lunt-Fontanne, New York City, October 31, 1987 contains all of the final two concerts of the run – the early show and the late show performed on Halloween. That album has two CDs of music played by the electric Jerry Garcia Band and two CDs by the Jerry Garcia Acoustic Band. Pure Jerry: Lunt-Fontanne, New York City, The Best of the Rest, October 15–30, 1987, includes selections from the entire run of concerts. It has two CDs by the Jerry Garcia Band and one CD by the Jerry Garcia Acoustic Band.

== Critical reception ==
Professional ratings
Review scores
Source	Rating
Allmusic	4/5 stars
The Music Box	3/5 stars
The Best Of Website	B+

On Allmusic, Lindsay Planer said, "Notable are the effective interpretations of Bob Dylan's 'Forever Young', 'Simple Twist of Fate', and 'Tangled Up in Blue'. Garcia's Grateful Dead bandmate Bob Weir makes a special appearance, contributing to 'When I Paint My Masterpiece' and 'All Along the Watchtower'. There are also several R&B nuggets... The selections gathered on the acoustic CD provide a different kind of musical Americana.... Standouts are the traditional 'Rosa Lee McFall', 'Drifting with the Tide', and the Blue Sky Boys' 1930s cut 'I'm Here to Get My Baby out of Jail', not to mention a few rare recordings of the Jerry Garcia Acoustic Band rehearsals as they work through 'Ashes of Love', 'Poison Love', and the aforementioned 'I'm Here to Get My Baby out of Jail'."

In The Music Box, John Metzger wrote, "Despite his firm commitment to electric music, Jerry Garcia never lost sight of his roots, and in 1987 he formed a short-lived but potent acoustic ensemble in order to perform at a special two-week engagement on Broadway as well as at a smattering of venues in California. Each show began with an hour-long acoustic set that dug deep into the songbook of America, and it ended with a blast of equally eclectic electric material. Taken in total, these concerts offered a sterling overview of Garcia’s disparate interests and featured some of the finest moments of his solo career.... the sound quality is noticeably less than perfect, and although the deficiency quietly settles into the background, it never manages to disappear completely."

On The Best Of Website, Barry Small said, "The acoustic band on this tour was a one time line-up and they surely are enjoyable. Though, they were very similar in personnel to the 1964 band the Black Mountain Boys that featured Garcia (banjo), Rothman (guitar), and Nelson (mandolin).... The electric material from Lunt-Fontanne: The Best of the Rest offers oodles of treasures. Disc one is a bit heavy on the Dylan material representing four songs.... The second electric disc from Lunt-Fontanne: The Best of the Rest is highlighted by some outstanding gospel songs; this line-up of the Jerry Garcia Band performed this style of music well."

== Track listing ==
Disc 1 – Jerry Garcia Band

1. "I'll Take a Melody" (Allen Toussaint) – 12:19
2. "Forever Young" (Bob Dylan) – 9:36
3. "Think" (Jimmy McCracklin, Deadric Malone) – 7:27
4. "The Night They Drove Old Dixie Down" (Robbie Robertson) – 9:38
5. "Simple Twist of Fate" (Dylan) – 11:15
6. "When I Paint My Masterpiece" (Dylan) – 5:57
7. "Deal" (Jerry Garcia, Robert Hunter) – 7:28
8. "All Along the Watchtower" (Dylan) – 5:27

Disc 2 – Jerry Garcia Band

1. "Get Out of My Life, Woman" (Toussaint) – 7:28
2. "Like a Road Leading Home" (Don Nix, Dan Penn) – 7:48
3. "Mission in the Rain" (Garcia, Hunter) – 9:27
4. "Mississippi Moon" (Peter Rowan) – 8:24
5. "Evangeline" (David Hidalgo, Louie Pérez) – 3:27
6. "That Lucky Old Sun" (Beasley Smith, Haven Gillespie) – 10:20
7. "And It Stoned Me" (Van Morrison) – 6:23
8. "Tangled Up in Blue" (Dylan) – 10:27

Disc 3 – Jerry Garcia Acoustic Band

1. "Rosa Lee McFall" (Charlie Monroe) – 4:06
2. "Drifting with the Tide" (traditional) – 3:31
3. Calling your bosses – 0:35
4. "I'm Here To Get My Baby out of Jail" (Karl Davis, Harty Taylor) – 5:31
5. "Drifting Too Far from the Shore" (Charles E. Moody) – 5:10
6. "I Ain't Never" (Webb Pierce, Mel Tillis) – 3:56
7. Band introduction – 1:09
8. "It's a Long Long Way (To the Top of the World)" (Don Wayne) – 4:40

Rehearsal recordings:

9. "Ashes of Love" (Jim Anglin) – 2:13
10. "Poison Love" (Elmer Laird) – 2:40
11. "I'm Here to Get My Baby out of Jail" (Davis, Taylor) – 3:33

== Personnel ==
Jerry Garcia Band

- Jerry Garcia – electric guitar, vocals
- Melvin Seals – keyboards
- John Kahn – bass guitar
- David Kemper – drums
- Jaclyn LaBranch – vocals
- Gloria Jones – vocals

Jerry Garcia Acoustic Band

- Jerry Garcia – acoustic guitar, vocals
- David Nelson – acoustic guitar, vocals
- Sandy Rothman – mandolin, dobro, banjo, vocals
- John Kahn – double bass
- Kenny Kosek – fiddle
- David Kemper – snare drum

Additional musicians

- Bob Weir – electric guitar, vocals on "When I Paint My Masterpiece", "Deal", "All Along the Watchtower"

Production

- Executive producers: Christopher Sabec, Peter McQuaid, Hale Milgrim
- Recording: John Cutler
- Production engineer: Tom Flye
- Second engineer: Robert Gatley
- Mastering: John Cuniberti
- Research and compilation: Blair Jackson, David Gans
- Album coordination: Jeff Adams
- Photography: Herb Greene
- Liner notes: Blair Jackson
