= Home, Home on the Road =

Live album by New Riders of the Purple Sage
- Released: April 1974
- Genre: Country rock
- Label: Columbia
- Producer: Jerry Garcia

New Riders of the Purple Sage chronology
The Adventures of Panama Red (1973)	Home, Home on the Road (1974)	Brujo (1974)

Professional ratings
Review scores
Source	Rating
Allmusic	2.5/5 stars

Home, Home on the Road is an album by the American country rock group the New Riders of the Purple Sage. Released by Columbia Records in 1974, it was their first live album, and their fifth album overall. The eleven songs on the album are a combination of originals and covers. Six of them had appeared on previous New Riders albums, and five had not.

Home, Home on the Road was produced by Jerry Garcia of the Grateful Dead, who had co-founded the New Riders and had been their original pedal steel guitar player. One track, "Kick in the Head", was written by Robert Hunter, who wrote the lyrics to many Grateful Dead songs.

== Track listing ==
1. "Hi, Hello, How Are You" (John Dawson)
2. "She's No Angel" (J.W. Arnold, Wanda Ballman)
3. "Groupie" (Dave Torbert)
4. "Sunday Susie" (Dawson)
5. "Kick in the Head" (Robert Hunter)
6. "Truck Drivin' Man" (Terry Fell)
7. "Hello Mary Lou" (Gene Pitney, C. Mangiaracina)
8. "Sutter's Mill" (Dawson)
9. "Dead Flowers" (Mick Jagger, Keith Richards)
10. "Henry" (Dawson)
11. "School Days" (Chuck Berry)

== Personnel ==
=== New Riders of the Purple Sage ===
- John Dawson – guitar, vocals
- David Nelson – guitar, vocals
- Dave Torbert – bass, vocals
- Buddy Cage – pedal steel guitar
- Spencer Dryden – drums

=== Additional musicians ===
- Andy Stein – baritone sax on "School Days"

=== Production ===
- Jerry Garcia – producer
- Tom Flye – recording and remix engineer
- Bob Edwards – sound engineer
- Tom Lubin – assistant engineer
- Chris Harms – cover art
- Recorded on the Record Plant NY White Truck with Frank Hubach, David Hewitt, John L. Venable

Cover photography: Jamie Eric Eisman
