= Sandy Rothman =

American bluegrass musician (born 1946)

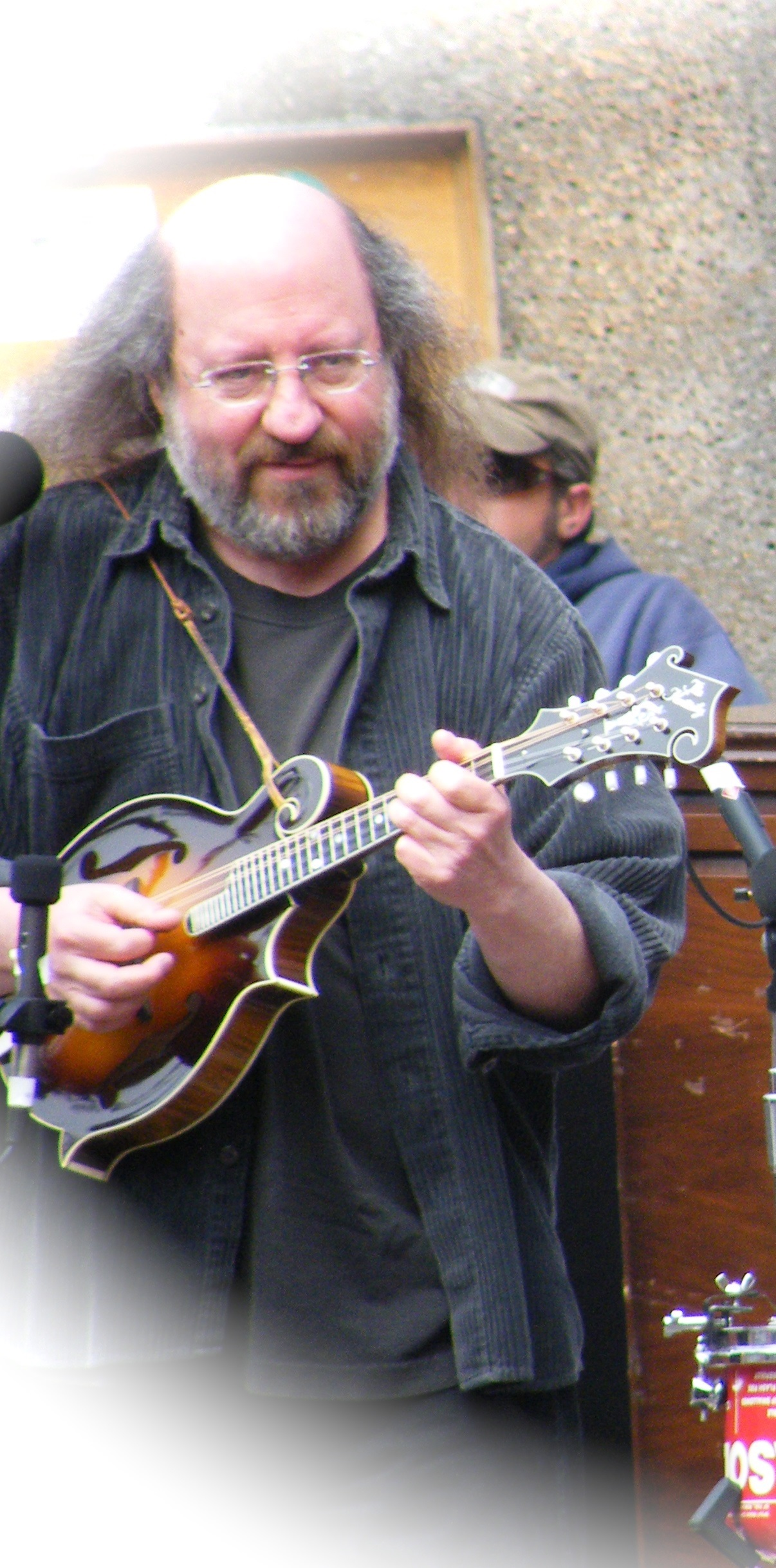
- Sandy Rothman in 2008

Background information
- Born: January 30, 1946 (age 80); Miami, Florida
- Origin: San Francisco, California
- Genres: Bluegrass
- Occupations: Musician, record producer
- Instruments: Mandolin, Dobro, banjo
- Years active: Early 1960s – present

Sandy Rothman (born January 30, 1946, Miami, Florida) is an American bluegrass multi-instrumentalist and record producer, playing mandolin, dobro and banjo. Rothman was a friend and colleague of Grateful Dead bandleader Jerry Garcia, and a member of the Jerry Garcia Acoustic Band. He performed with Garcia and David Nelson as the Black Mountain Boys in 1964, and has played in 1964 with Bill Monroe and his Blue Grass Boys, Earl Taylor, Red Allen, Jimmie Skinner, Larry Sparks, the Kentucky Colonels, Country Joe McDonald, Kathy Kallick and Clarence White, among other musicians.

== Discography ==
- Almost Acoustic – Jerry Garcia Acoustic Band – Arista Records (1988) (producer and performer)
- The Old Road to Home – Sandy Rothman – Tonebar Records (1993) (producer and performer)
- Bluegrass Guitar Duets – Sandy Rothman and Steve Pottier – Sierra Records (1994)
- Pure Jerry: Lunt-Fontanne, New York City, October 31, 1987 – Jerry Garcia Band and Jerry Garcia Acoustic Band – Jerry Made Records (2004)
- Pure Jerry: Lunt-Fontanne, New York City, The Best of the Rest, October 15–30, 1987 – Jerry Garcia Band and Jerry Garcia Acoustic Band – Jerry Made Records (2004)
- Songs of the Grateful Dead: A Tribute to Jerry Garcia and Robert Hunter – Jesse McReynolds and Friends, feat. David Nelson and Stu Allen – Woodstock Records (2010) (producer and performer)
- Ragged but Right – Jerry Garcia Acoustic Band – Jerry Made Records (2010) (recorded in 1987) (producer and performer)
- On Broadway: Act One – October 28th, 1987 – Jerry Garcia Band and Jerry Garcia Acoustic Band – ATO Records (2015)
- Electric on the Eel – included on the Jerry Garcia Acoustic Band bonus disc Acoustic on the Eel (2019)
