= Wanted: Live at Turkey Trot =

Live album by New Riders of the Purple Sage
- Released: 2007
- Recorded: 2006
- Genre: Country rock
- Length: CD – 76:44; DVD – 88:52
- Label: Fa-Ka-Wee
- Producer: CD – Michael Falzarano; DVD – Michael A. Fitch

New Riders of the Purple Sage chronology
S.U.N.Y., Stonybrook, NY, 3/17/73 (2007)	Wanted: Live at Turkey Trot (2007)	Winterland, San Francisco, CA, 12/31/77 (2009)

Wanted: Live at Turkey Trot is a concert video and an album by the American country rock band the New Riders of the Purple Sage. It was recorded in 2006 at Turkey Trot Acres, a hunting lodge in Candor, New York. It was released in 2007 as a DVD packaged together with a CD.

Wanted: Live at Turkey Trot was the first album of new recordings released by the New Riders after the band re-formed in 2005. It features David Nelson and Buddy Cage, from the "classic" early 1970s lineup, along with then-new band members Michael Falzarano, Ronnie Penque, and Johnny Markowski.

== Track listing ==
1. "Lonesome L.A. Cowboy" (Peter Rowan) – 5:08
2. "Sutter's Mill" (John Dawson) – 3:25
3. "Watcha Gonna Do" (Dawson) – 2:59
4. "Last Lonely Eagle" (Dawson) – 5:59
5. "Rainbow" (Dawson) – 3:59
6. "Portland Woman" (Dawson) – 12:04
7. "One Too Many Stories" (Dawson) – 5:14
8. "Henry" (Dawson) – 4:51
9. "Sliding Delta" (Mississippi John Hurt) – 4:22
10. "Lochinvar" (Dawson) – 4:30
11. "Garden of Eden" (Dawson) – 16:25
12. "I Don't Know You" (Dawson) – 3:53
13. "Panama Red" (Rowan) – 3:47

== Personnel ==
=== New Riders of the Purple Sage ===
- David Nelson – lead guitar, vocals
- Buddy Cage – pedal steel guitar
- Michael Falzarano – guitar, vocals
- Ronnie Penque – bass, vocals
- Johnny Markowski – drums, vocals

=== Production ===
- Video produced, directed, and edited by Michael A. Fitch
- Audio produced by Michael Falzarano
- Live recording engineer Jeff Stachyra, assisted by Todd McCarthy
- Mixed by Michael Falzarano and Jon Marshall Smith
- Still photos and cover design by Daniel T. Cole - Rexford NY.
- Panama Red art by Lore
- Smoke signals by Michael Ferguson and Kelly
