= Ronnie Penque =

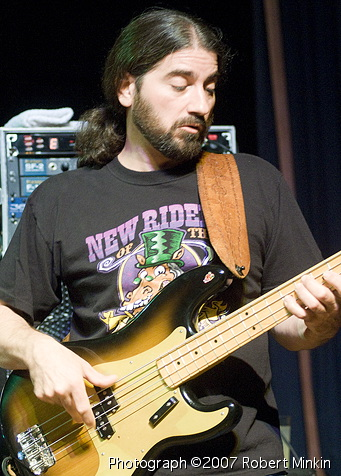

Background information
- Born: March 23, 1962 (age 64)
- Genre: Rock
- Instrument: Bass
- Years active: 1978–present
- Website: ronniepenque.com

Ronnie Penque (born March 23, 1962) is a bassist, singer and songwriter who has been working in the music industry for over 45 years. He has been the bassist for the country rock band New Riders of the Purple Sage since 2005.

The New Riders emerged from the psychedelic rock scene in San Francisco, California in 1969. The band originally included members of the Grateful Dead including Phil Lesh and Jerry Garcia. Penque was also lead singer and bass player for Melvin Seals and JGB. Melvin Seals is the keyboard player for the original Jerry Garcia Band. For the last 48 years Penque has worked other New York area bands including Ripple, Stir Fried and Splintered Sunlight out of Philadelphia, Pennsylvania.

When not working with NRPS Ronnie is busy with his other bands, the Ronnie Penque Band, Dead to The Core, and the Penque-Diomede Band, or doing session work. On November 2, 2010, Penque released his first solo album, titled Only Road Home, on Bayland Records. In 2018 Penque founded Panama Dead, a band dedicated to the music of the New Riders of the Purple Sage.

== Discography ==
- Wanted: Live at Turkey Trot – New Riders of the Purple Sage (2007)
- Where I Come From – New Riders of the Purple Sage (2009)
- Only Road Home – Ronnie Penque Band (2010)
- 17 Pine Avenue – New Riders of the Purple Sage (2012)
- Family Business – Ronnie Penque (2019)
