= Standing on the Corner (Blue Yodel No. 9) =

Song by Jimmie Rodgers
- Recorded: July 16, 1930
- Genre: Hillbilly (Country); Country blues
- Length: 2:41
- Songwriter: Jimmie Rodgers

"Blue Yodel #9" (also called "Standing on the Corner" from the opening line) is a blues-country song by Jimmie Rodgers and is the ninth of his "Blue Yodels". Rodgers recorded the song on July 16, 1930 in Los Angeles with an unbilled Louis Armstrong on trumpet and his wife Lil Hardin Armstrong on piano. Armstrong and Hardin were not listed on this session due to Armstrong's contract with Okeh; this session was for Victor. According to Thomas Brothers, the irregular blues form along with the irregular phrases used by Rodgers frequently threw off Armstrong until he reached his own solo chorus, where he sticks to a regular 12 bar blues form.

The song is set in Memphis at the corner of Beale Street and Main Street, a block from the current location of B.B. King's Blues Club. It tells a tale warning all the "rounders" in Memphis of the arrival a "Tennessee hustler". As he tells a policeman who demands his name:

I said, you'll find my name on the tail of my shirt
I'm a Tennessee hustler and I don't have to work

The song was selected as one of The Rock and Roll Hall of Fame's 500 Songs that Shaped Rock and Roll. In 1970, Armstrong performed the song with Johnny Cash on The Johnny Cash Show.

== See also ==
- Yodeling
