= David Nelson (musician) =

American musician, singer, and songwriter (born 1943)

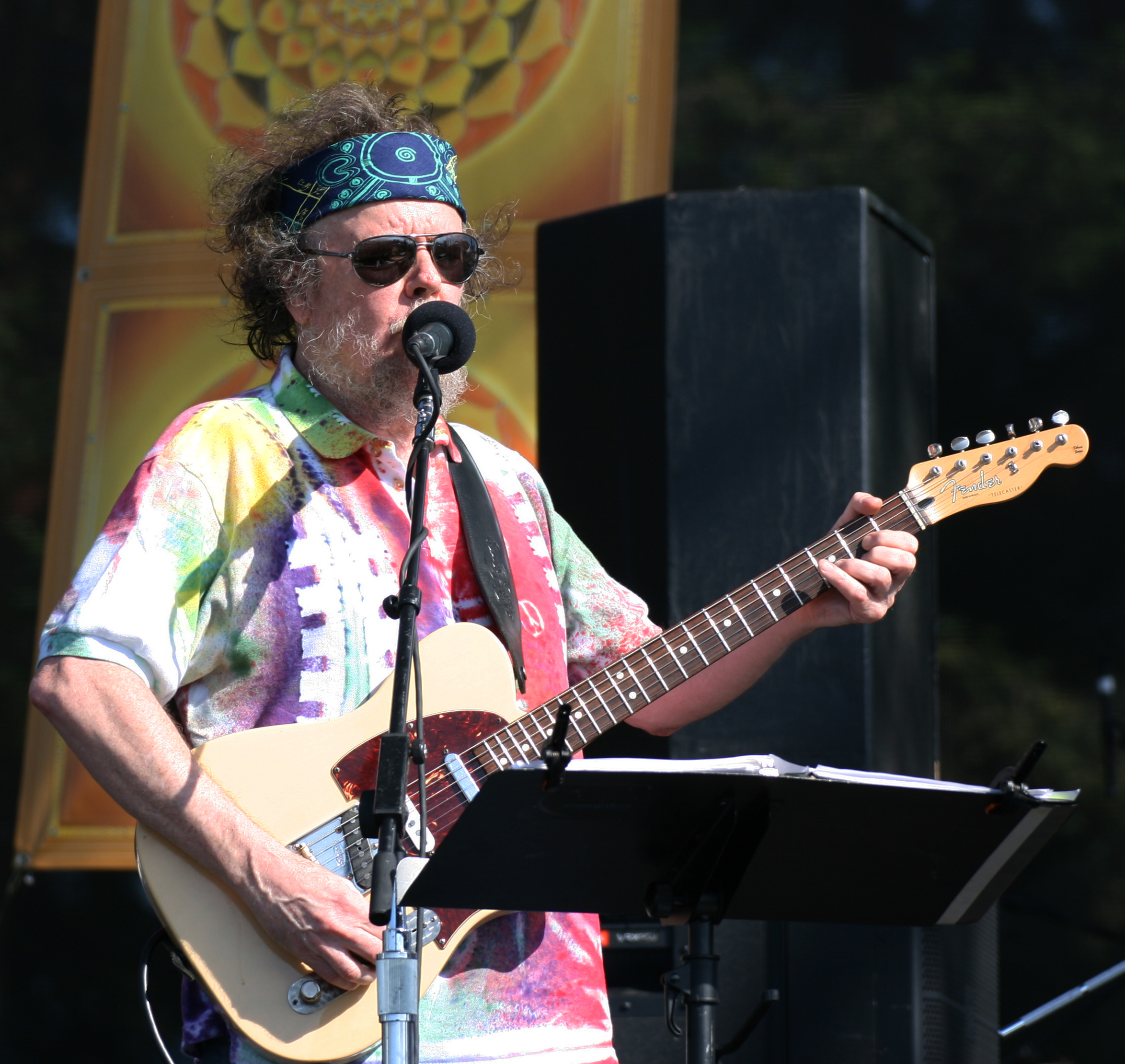
- Nelson in 2015

Background information
- Born: June 12, 1943 (age 82); Seattle, Washington, U.S.
- Origin: San Francisco Bay Area
- Genres: Rock, country rock, bluegrass, folk
- Occupation(s): Musician, songwriter
- Instruments: Electric guitar; vocals; mandolin
- Years active: Early 1960s – present
- Member of: New Riders of the Purple Sage, David Nelson Band
- Formerly of: Jerry Garcia Acoustic Band, Phil Lesh and Friends
- Website: nelsonband.com

David Brian Nelson (born June 12, 1943) is an American musician, singer, and songwriter. He is perhaps best known as a co-founder and longtime member of the New Riders of the Purple Sage.

== Career ==
Nelson started his musical career playing folk and bluegrass music, most notably as a member of The Wildwood Boys with Jerry Garcia. Shortly after his friend and former bandmate began to play rock music with The Warlocks (subsequently renamed the Grateful Dead), Nelson joined the similarly inclined New Delhi River Band. Although they lacked the managerial acumen and cultural cachet of the Grateful Dead and elected to remain in East Palo Alto, California unlike the former group, who soon relocated to the Haight-Ashbury district of San Francisco, the New Delhi River Band were considered to be the house band of The Barn (one of the region's few viable concert venues outside of San Francisco) in Scotts Valley, California by late 1966. The group continued to enjoy a cult following in Santa Clara and Santa Cruz Counties through the Summer of Love until their dissolution in early 1968.

While performing with various ephemeral bluegrass groups (such as High Country, which enabled him to renew his friendship with Garcia) in early 1969, Nelson was recruited by the remaining rhythm section of Peter Albin and Dave Getz to serve as the lead guitarist of the reconstituted Big Brother and the Holding Company. Before the group began to audition potential replacements for Janis Joplin, Garcia and fellow Palo Alto folk scene veteran John "Marmaduke" Dawson invited Nelson to serve as the lead guitarist for their new psychedelic country rock venture, the New Riders of the Purple Sage. (Big Brother ultimately reformed later in the year by augmenting the 1968 membership save for Joplin with two singers and a third guitarist.) After playing with the New Riders from 1969 to 1982, Nelson left the band to pursue other musical opportunities; these included a stint on Broadway as a member of the Jerry Garcia Acoustic Band and some time touring with Al Rapone and the Zydeco Express.

In the mid 1990s, Nelson formed his own group, the critically acclaimed David Nelson Band (aka DNB), whose original members included Bill Laymon (New Riders, Jefferson Starship, Harmony Grits, Gypsy Cowboy Band) on bass, Barry Sless (Cowboy Jazz, Phil Lesh and Friends, Kingfish) on lead and pedal steel guitar, Michael "Mookie" Siegel (Kingfish, Phil Lesh and Friends, Kettle Joe's Psychedelic Swamp Revue) on keyboards and accordion, and Arthur Steinhorn (Cowboy Jazz) on drums. Later on, drumming duties were shared by Charlie Crane, Greg Anton (Zero) and Jimmy Sanchez (Flying Other Brothers). Since 2007, working under the name David Nelson Band, the lineup now includes Pete Sears (Jefferson Starship, Hot Tuna, Rod Stewart) on bass and keyboards, and John Molo (Phil Lesh & Friends, Bruce Hornsby and the Range, John Fogerty) on drums.

Along with noted steel player Buddy Cage and guitarist Michael Falzarano, Nelson re-formed The New Riders of the Purple Sage in 2005. This band is currently experiencing a resurgence in popularity, due not only to the veteran performers who front the band but because of the energy provided by drummer Johnny Markowski (Stir Fried) and Ronnie Penque (Ripple, Neon Gods) on bass.

In addition to NRPS, Nelson still performs with the David Nelson Band as well as with The Papermill Creek Rounders, a bluegrass group he co-founded with his long-time friend, Lowell "Banana" Levenger (formerly of The Youngbloods).

During the summer of 2006, Nelson was asked to contribute to an album of Grateful Dead songs being made in Nashville by Jesse McReynolds. While in Nashville for the recording sessions, Nelson appeared on the Grand Ole Opry and played "Ripple," the first-ever Grateful Dead song to be performed on the Opry.

In addition to his work in his own bands, Nelson has performed as a guest artist on recordings by many other artists, including three Grateful Dead albums: Aoxomoxoa, Workingman's Dead, and American Beauty. He is well known as the lead singer on The New Riders of the Purple Sage's 1973 countercultural anthem, "Panama Red". In 2019, following the passing of Robert Hunter, Nelson released a previously unheard collaboration with the lyricist.

== Discography ==
This is a partial discography of albums on which David Nelson appears.

=== David Nelson Band ===
- Limited Edition (1996)
- Keeper of the Key (1997)
- Visions Under the Moon (1999)
- High Adventure in Japan (1999)
- Once in a Blue Moon (2014)

=== New Riders of the Purple Sage ===
- New Riders of the Purple Sage (1971)
- Powerglide (1972)
- Gypsy Cowboy (1972)
- The Adventures of Panama Red (1973)
- Home, Home on the Road (1974)
- Brujo (1974)
- Oh, What a Mighty Time (1975)
- New Riders (1976)
- Who Are Those Guys? (1977)
- Marin County Line (1977)
- Feelin' All Right (1981)
- Before Time Began (1986)
- Vintage NRPS (1986)
- Live on Stage (1993)
- Worcester, MA, 4/4/73 (2003)
- Boston Music Hall, 12/5/72 (2003)
- Veneta, Oregon, 8/27/72 (2004)
- Armadillo World Headquarters, Austin, TX, 6/13/75 (2005)
- S.U.N.Y., Stonybrook, NY, 3/17/73 (2007)
- Wanted: Live at Turkey Trot (2007)
- Winterland, San Francisco, CA, 12/31/77 (2009)
- Where I Come From (2009)
- 17 Pine Avenue (2012)
- Thanksgiving in New York City (2019)
- Bear's Sonic Journals: Dawn of the New Riders of the Purple Sage (2020)
- Lyceum '72 (2022)
- Hempsteader (2024)

=== With other artists ===
- Aoxomoxoa – Grateful Dead (1969)
- Workingman's Dead – Grateful Dead (1970)
- American Beauty – Grateful Dead (1970)
- Slewfoot – David Rea (1973)
- Pistol Packin' Mama – The Good Old Boys (1976)
- Rock Columbia – Robert Hunter (1986)
- A Wing and a Prayer – Matt Kelly (1987)
- Almost Acoustic – Jerry Garcia Acoustic Band (1988)
- Zydeco to Go – Al Rapone (1990)
- Frank Wakefield and the Good Old Boys – Frank Wakefield and the Good Old Boys (1992)
- She's No Angel – Frank Wakefield and the Good Old Boys (1992)
- Dead Ringers – Dead Ringers (1993)
- Blue Morning – Toni Brown (1996)
- Dick's Picks Volume 8 – Grateful Dead (1997)
- Don't Stop the Music (Arrets Pas La Musique) – Allen Fontenot and the Country Cajuns (1997)
- Pure Jerry: Lunt-Fontanne, New York City, October 31, 1987 – Jerry Garcia Band and Jerry Garcia Acoustic Band (2004)
- Pure Jerry: Lunt-Fontanne, New York City, The Best of the Rest, October 15–30, 1987 – Jerry Garcia Band and Jerry Garcia Acoustic Band (2004)
- For Rex: The Black Tie Dye Ball – various artists (2006)
- Crossing the Line – Bill Cutler (2008)
- Road Trips Volume 3 Number 3 – Grateful Dead (2010)
- Ragged but Right – Jerry Garcia Acoustic Band (2010)
- Songs of the Grateful Dead – Jesse McReynolds (2010)
- The Wheel: A Musical Celebration of Jerry Garcia – various artists (2011)
- On Broadway: Act One – October 28th, 1987 – Jerry Garcia Band and Jerry Garcia Acoustic Band (2015)
- Folk Time – Hart Valley Drifters (2016)
- Before the Dead – various artists (2018)
- Good Old Boys Live: Drink Up & Go Home – The Good Old Boys (2018)
- Family Business – Ronnie Penque (2019)
