= Trouble in Mind (song) =

Early blues standard written by Richard M. Jones

- Sheet music cover

Single by Thelma La Vizzo with Richard M. Jones
- A-side: "Fire in the Mountain"
- Released: 1924
- Recorded: May 15, 1924
- Genre: Classic female blues
- Length: 2:56
- Label: Paramount
- Songwriter: Richard M. Jones

"Trouble in Mind" is a vaudeville blues-style song written by jazz pianist Richard M. Jones. Singer Thelma La Vizzo with Jones on piano first recorded it in 1924 and in 1926, Bertha "Chippie" Hill popularized the tune with her recording with Jones and trumpeter Louis Armstrong. The song became an early blues standard, with numerous renditions by a variety of musicians in a variety of styles.

== Lyrics and composition ==
"Trouble in Mind" has been called "one of the enduring anthems of the blues as hope for the future even in the darkest of times". In many versions, new lyrics are added. However, most usually include the well-known verse:

Trouble in mind, I'm blue
But I won't be blue always
'Cause I know the sun's gonna shine in my back door someday

The song has roots that pre-date blues. Two spiritual songs from the 1800s have been identified as antecedents: "I'm a-Trouble in De Mind", published in the Slave Songs of the United States (1867); and "I'm Troubled in Mind", cited in The Story of the [Fisk University] Jubilee Singers and Their Songs (1880). Other folk song collections from the early 1900s include similar titles, but the lyrics are not the same as those later used by Richard M. Jones.

Jones' lyrics deal with thoughts of suicide. Early recordings include the verses:

Sometimes I feel like livin'
Sometimes I feel like dyin' ...
I'm gonna lay my head
On the lonesome railroad line
Let the 2:19
Satisfy my mind

Despite the sense of pain and despair, music writers such as Adam Gussow and Paul Ackerman point to the hope engendered by the refrain "I won't be blue always ... For the sun will shine in my back door some day". Blues historian William Barlow calls the song "the anthem of the classic blues genre" and writer Steve Sullivan describes it as "one of the most indelible blues compositions of the 1920s.

Musically, the song is an eight-bar blues, used with variations in other early classic female blues songs, such as "Ain't Nobody's Business" (written by Porter Grainger and Everett Robbins in 1922) and "Nobody Knows You When You're Down and Out" (Jimmy Cox, 1923). One music transcription shows an eight-bar chord progression in the key of G major in common or 4/4 time at a slow tempo:

I	V^{7}	I^{7}	IV ♯IV^{o}	I	ii^{7} V^{7}	I I^{7}	ii^{7} V^{7}

Another has a simplified version with the lyrics: "Trouble in [I] mind. I'm [V] blue. But I [I] won't be blue al- [IV] ways, 'cause the [I] sun's gonna shine in [V] my backdoor some- [I] day".

== Recordings ==
Blues historian Gerard Herzhaft identifies "Trouble in Mind" as a blues standard "that has been recorded over and over again in jazz, blues, and pop". In 1924, Thelma La Vizzo was the first to record the tune, with Jones accompanying her on piano. Two years later, Bertha "Chippie" Hill recorded it, with Jones and Louis Armstrong on cornet (sometimes identified as trumpet). In a review of Hill's 1926 rendition by early jazz critic Rudi Blesh, he noted "poetically and musically it is of rare order ... The voice sings in high register, except for the downward cadences which end the phrases; the taut, muted trumpet is very blue in tone; underneath, the piano is simple and rich". In 2020, the Blues Foundation inducted Hill's rendition into the Blues Hall of Fame as a "Classic of Blues Recording".

When Georgia White recorded the song in 1936, she also was accompanied by Jones on piano, and by a guitarist and bassist. According to Big Bill Broonzy, her performances beginning in 1929 with Jimmie Noone helped to popularize the piece long before she recorded it. (Note: Broonzy recorded the song several times and a solo performance with vocal and guitar is included on Trouble in Mind (2000), a collection of some of his 1956–1957 recordings by Smithsonian Folkways.) In 1936 it was also recorded by Bob Wills and His Texas Playboys.

In 1952, Dinah Washington recorded "Trouble in Mind", which was released shortly after her rendition of "Wheel of Fortune". Hers was the first recording of the song to reach the record charts, peaking at number four on the Billboard Rhythm & Blues chart. Reviews from 1952 welcomed her return to a blues singing-style after pop-oriented songs, such as "Wheel of Fortune".

Nina Simone also scored a hit with it in 1961, when her recording reached numbers 11 on the R&B chart and 92 on the Billboard Hot 100 singles chart. Several additional recordings by Simone are in release, including a live performance from the 1960 Newport Jazz Festival (Nina Simone at Newport) and a more intimate small-combo studio version from 1965 (Pastel Blues). In a review of the 1965 Antibes–Juan-les-Pins Jazz Festival in France, Billboard noted her performance of "Trouble in Mind" as "the blues at its most compelling and featured such unorthodox lyrical variations as 'Gonna let the 2:19 train and barbiturates ease my troubled mind'".

Marianne Faithfull recorded the song for the neo-noir film Trouble in Mind (film) in 1985.

A 2011 live recording from Levon Helm and Mavis Staples appears on the 2022 album Carry Me Home.

== See also ==
- List of train songs
