= Richard M. Jones =

American jazz pianist and bandleader (1892–1945)

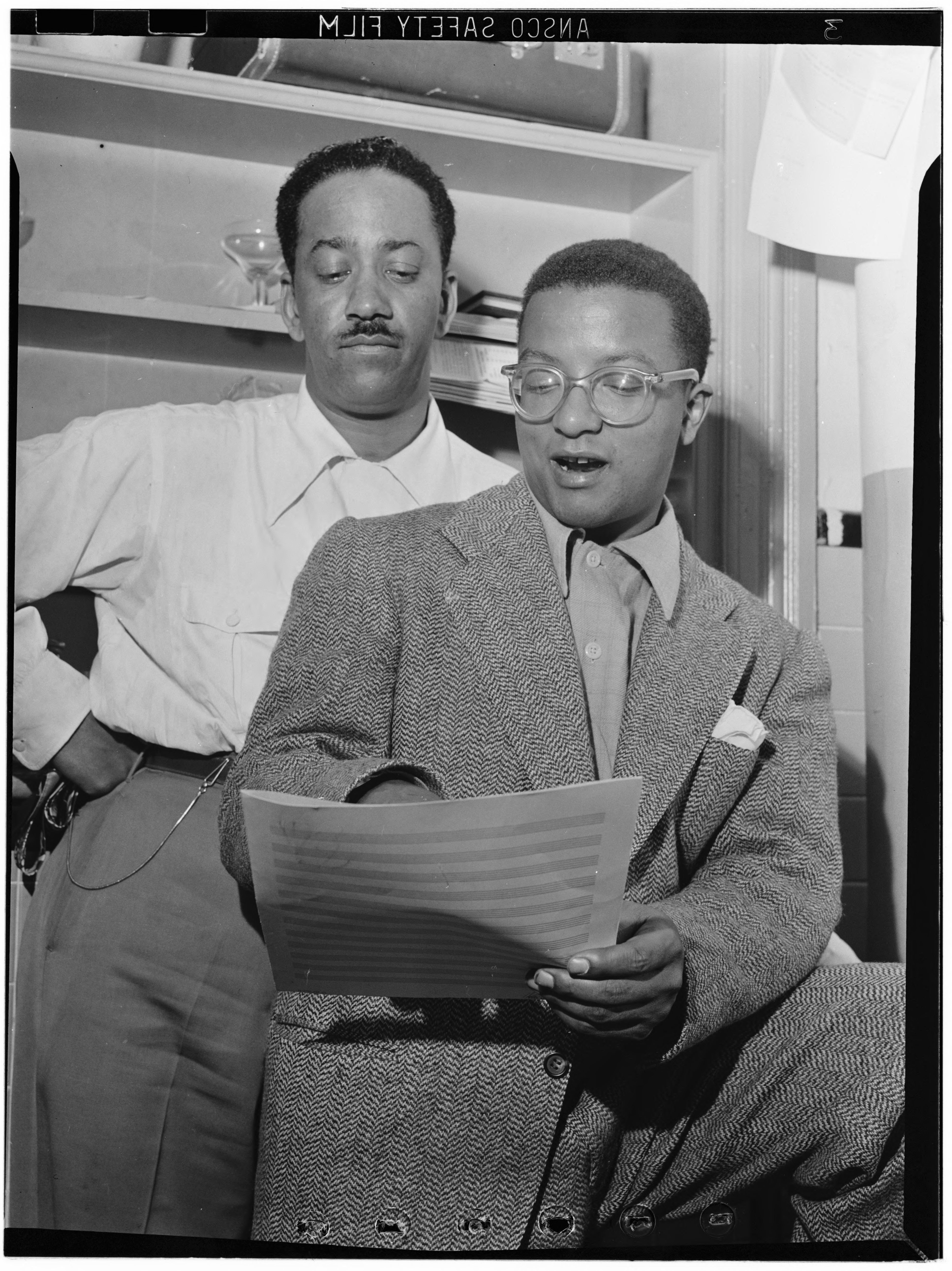

Richard M. Jones, born Richard Marigny Jones (sometimes written Richard Mariney Jones), (June 13, 1892 – December 8, 1945) was an American jazz pianist, composer, band leader, and record producer. Numerous songs bear his name as author, including "Trouble in Mind".

He was born in Donaldsonville, Louisiana, United States. Jones grew up in New Orleans, Louisiana. Jones suffered from a stiff leg and walked with a limp; fellow musicians gave him the nickname "Richard My Knee Jones" as a pun on his middle name. In his youth he played alto horn in brass bands. His main instrument, however, became the piano. By 1908, he was playing in Storyville, the red-light district of New Orleans. A few years later, he often led a small band which sometimes included Joe Oliver. Jones also worked in the bands of John Robichaux, Armand J. Piron, and Papa Celestin.

In 1918, Jones moved to Chicago, Illinois. He worked as Chicago manager for publisher and pianist Clarence Williams. Jones began recording in 1923, making gramophone records as a piano soloist, accompanist to vocalists, and with his bands The Jazz Wizards and The Chicago Cosmopolitans. He recorded for Gennett, OKeh, Victor, and Paramount Records in the 1920s. He also worked for OKeh Records as Chicago supervisor of the company's "Race" (African-American) Records for most of the decade. During this period he was the producer of the influential Hot Five and Hot Seven recordings led by cornetist (later trumpeter) Louis Armstrong. In the 1930s, Jones performed a similar management role for Decca.

Richard M. Jones worked for Mercury Records until his death in December 1945 in Chicago, at the age of 53.

== Other sources ==
- Doran, James M.; Kernfeld, Barry (2001). "Richard M. Jones". In Sadie, Stanley; Tyrrell, John (eds.). The New Grove Dictionary of Music and Musicians (2nd ed.). London: Macmillan Publishers. ISBN 978-1-56159-239-5.
- Roy Middleton, Hennie van Veelo, and Christopher Hillman. Richard M. Jones: Forgotten Man of Jazz. London: Cygnet Productions, 1997.
