= Deep Elm Blues =

Song
- Genre: Traditional
- Songwriter: Traditional

The "Deep Elm Blues" (also spelled "Deep Elem Blues" or "Deep Ellum Blues") is an American traditional song. The title of the tune refers to the historic African-American neighborhood in downtown Dallas, Texas known as Deep Ellum, which was home to blues musicians including Blind Lemon Jefferson, Blind Willie Johnson, Lead Belly, and Bill Neely.

The first known recording was made by the Cofer Brothers in 1923 under the band name the Georgia Crackers with the title "The Georgia Black Bottom" on OKeh Records (OKeh 45111). The song alluded to the dance craze called Black Bottom of the 1920s which, in part, referenced the community of Black Bottom, Detroit. The change from Black Bottom to Deep Elm occurred sometime between 1926 and 1933.

The Shelton Brothers recorded various versions of this song, the first being cut in 1933 with Leon Chappelear under the pseudonym of Lone Star Cowboys for Bluebird Records. They recorded it again in 1935 for Decca Records followed by "Deep Elm No.2" and "Deep Elm No.3". Les Paul (as Rhubarb Red) recorded "Deep Elem Blues" and "Deep Elem Blues #2" on Decca in 1936. The Sheltons also recorded it in the 1940s as "Deep Elm Boogie" for King Records.

Other versions of the song were made between 1957 and 1958 by Jerry Lee Lewis for Sun Records, Bobby Jackson for Gold Air Records, Mary McCoy & the Cyclones for Jin Records and, later, by Jerry Garcia, the Grateful Dead, Levon Helm, the Infamous Stringdusters, The Asylum Street Spankers, and Rory Gallagher.
