= David Kemper =

American rock drummer

David Law Kemper
- Born: 1947 (age 78–79); Chicago, Illinois, U.S.
- Occupation: Musician
- Instrument: Drums

David Law Kemper (born 1947/8 in Chicago, Illinois) is an American rock drummer who was a member of the Jerry Garcia Band (1983–1994) and Bob Dylan's band (1996–2001).

He was with the Jerry Garcia Band from 1983 until January 1994, when he was suddenly dismissed for reasons still unknown to him. He went on to spend five years as Bob Dylan's drummer. Kemper joined Dutch progressive rock band Focus from 1975 to 1977, playing both on the Mother Focus album and tour. He has played with Mike Stinson, Elkie Brooks, Dennis Wilson (on the Bambu sessions) and Bernie Leadon. He played double drums with Jim Gordon on Barry McGuire's "Don't Blame God" from his Lighten Up album in 1974. When, at the peak of the Average White Band's success drummer Robbie McIntosh died, Kemper was enlisted for tour dates until Steve Ferrone could join as a member. Six of the nine tracks with drumming on Joan Armatrading's 1977 album, "Show Some Emotion", feature Kemper, with London session ace Henry Spinetti (Eric Clapton, George Harrison, Gerry Rafferty, Paul McCartney) and Kenney Jones (Small Faces, Faces, The Who) splitting the remainder.
