= Rightscorp =

U.S. copyright enforcement company

Rightscorp, Inc.
- Type: Public
- Traded as: OTCID Basic Current: RIHT
- Industry: Digital media
- Founded: Nevada, September 16, 2009
- Founder: Christopher Sabec, Robert Steele, Greg Boswell
- Headquarters: Santa Monica, California, United States
- Area served: United States
- Key people: Christopher Sabec
- Services: Copyright infringement detection and remediation
- Website: www.rightscorp.com

Rightscorp. Inc (formerly DigitalRights) is a Los-Angeles based copyright enforcement company, which locates alleged copyright violators and collects money from legal damages as well as out of court settlements on behalf of the copyright holder(s). Rightscorp manages copyrights of videos, music, and video games.

== Services ==
=== Clients ===
Rightscorp represents music, movie, and print publishers. In May 2014, Rightscorp reached 1.5 million copyrights being managed, including those held by Warner Bros. The company manages copyrights for over 800 feature films, including 14 movie titles with gross sales of over $3.5 billion.

Rightscorp works with music interests such as BMG Rights Management, which represents such musicians as David Bowie, Kings of Leon, and Will.i.am and is a member of the American Association of Independent Music. The company represents more than 13,000 copyrights held by Blue Pie Productions and metal/hardcore label Rotten Records. During the week of 24 February 2013, the company was also monitoring 13 songs on the Billboard Hot 100.

=== Monitoring ===
Rightcorp utilizes crawlers, which according to Steele and CEO Christopher Sabec, crawls Bittorrent file-sharing sites and finds seeders and their IP addresses over time. Though the company has the seeders’ IP addresses, it requires the ISPs to connect their notices to the seeders. Sabec also says the company can discriminate between actual piracy and unauthorized internet access, but there is no evidence to substantiate this claim.

In response to mobile streaming apps such as Meerkat, Periscope, and Popcorn Time, the company has also announced a "Streaming Rights Monitoring" service in May 2015, which the Rightscorp claims will be able to continuously monitor for streaming of copyrighted material on mobile streaming networks.

=== Notice forwarding ===
After determining the target IP address, Rightscorp requests that the Internet service provider for that address forward a notice of infringement to the user. The subscribers of more than American 70 ISPs have paid settlements to the company, including Charter Communications, CenturyLink, and others. Rightscorp COO Robert Steele told Ars Technica that more ISPs are forwarding their notices each month. According to the company, over 200 ISPs are participating with Rightscorp as of November 2014.

However, ISPs do not always choose to comply with the request to forward notices. As of November 2014, music publishers BMG and Round Hill are suing Cox Communications for not terminating the accounts of users identified by Rightscorp as being allegedly repeat downloaders. In May 2015, Rightscorp filed suit against two Comcast users for downloading two albums, including Acid Bath's When the Kite String Pops and D.R.I.'s Definition. The company claims one of the downloaders ignored 11 notices, the other, 288. Rotten Records, through Rightscorp, is demanding an injunction against further infringement, deletion of the files, and a fine of $150,000 per work.

=== Settlements and disconnections ===
In the notice of infringement, the Rightscorp offers a choice between paying a small settlement fee (around $10 to US$20 per violation) or facing a possible lawsuit for damages of around US$150,000 under the Digital Millennium Copyright Act (DMCA), the current law. After collection, Rightscorp's settlements are split 50/50 with its clients.

The company compares its settlement option of $20 per alleged infringement to a traffic ticket, calling it a "socially fair way to create a deterrent." Even though the notice works as a settlement offer, the notice is not in itself enforceable by law, and the liability of the infringed offender has to be determined by a civil court.

If the user chooses not to pay and is repeatedly alleged of violated copyright infringements, the ISP may suspend or terminate the subscriber account until a settlement is reached. TorrentFreak claimed in 2011 that more than 200,000 BitTorrent users were in some stage of a lawsuit for alleged copyright infringement. The company also stated that it has closed more than 75,000 cases of online copyright infringement.

== Lawsuits ==
=== Class action lawsuit ===
On November 21, 2014, Morgan Pietz of The Pietz Law Firm, together with Drew Pomerance of Roxborough, Pomerance, Nye & Adreani filed a class action lawsuit against Rightscorp Inc, various John Does, and its owners, Christopher Sabec, Robert Steele, and outside legal counsel, Craig Harmon. The complaint seeks class certification against Rightscorp for violations of the Telephone Consumer Protection Act, the Fair Debt Collection Practices Act, California's Rosenthal Act, and abuse of process for the willful misuse of subpoena power by issuing special DMCA subpoenas, under 17 U.S.C. § 512(h). Mr. Pietz's original plaintiff withdrew from the case. After locating replacement plaintiffs, he refiled the suit, but dropped half of the claims originally contained in it. Subsequently, one of Pietz's two surviving claims was stricken by the Court, and in the process, legal fees were awarded against Pietz's client. At approximately the same time, over Pietz's objections, the Court dismissed Harmon (whom Pietz had incorrectly identified as an employee or officer of Rightscorp) from the case.

On May 12, 2015, a federal court ordered John Blaha, represented by Pietz, to pay attorney's fees in John Blaha v. Rightscorp. Pietz filed the lawsuit as a class action; he asserted Rightscorp, on behalf of Warner Bros and BMG Rights Management, abused the judicial system by issuing 142 DMCA subpoenas. Rightscorp countered that suing on those grounds was a violation of the first amendment and subject to California's anti-SLAPP laws. The judge sided with Rightscorp, but it still faces an allegation that it violated the Telephone Consumer Protection Act by making automated calls to demand settlements.

=== Telephone Consumer Protection Act lawsuit ===
On February 17, 2015, Plaintiffs Melissa Brown and Ben Jenkins represented by Attorney Sergei Lemberg of Lemberg Law LLC filed a lawsuit against Rightscorp Inc and its clients named as John Does 1–10 in the United States District Court for the Middle District of Georgia for Telephone Consumer Protection Act abuses and other violations.

Brown and Jenkins claim that Rightscorp Inc and its clients violated America's Telephone Consumer Protection Act by sending automated calls and text messages in their general direction without permission. Evidence shows that Jenkins sent Rightscorp Inc numerous emails instructing Rightscorp Inc to cease their calls, text messages, emails, and letter solicitations to him and Brown. Regardless, Rightscorp Inc continued to place calls and text messages to the Plaintiffs’ cellular and home phones. Brown and Jenkins are seeking damages for each alleged violation of the Telephone Consumer Protection Act.

=== BMG Rights Management vs. Cox Communications ===
On behalf of BMG Rights Management, Rightscorp won a ruling in a jury trial against Cox on December 17, 2015, for $25 million. US District Judge Liam O'Grady, found that Cox failed to "reasonably implement" a method to terminate repeated infringers and that the Digital Millennium Copyright Act's "safe harbor" provision did not apply.

In addition, Lloyd's of London took legal action to remove their liability obligations to Cox, based on, according to their filings, negligence, and disregard for copyright infringement violations. The total amount Cox could be liable for, with Lloyd's underwriting, is estimated to be in the tens of billions of dollars.

== Finances ==
In October 2013 the company went public, trading on the OTCQB under the ticker RIHT. In May 2014 the company announced that it is expanding into Canada and was in Europe investigating expansion in Europe. On November 14, 2014, Rightscorp filed a Form 10-Q with the Securities and Exchange Commission reporting its Q3 2014 earnings. The company reported a total loss of $2.2 million for the first three quarters of 2014 along with a total loss of $6.5 million since 2011.

In 2015, Rightscorp had a net loss of $3.5 million and in the first three months of 2016 it had a net loss of $784,000.

== Security breach ==
Security issues with Rightscorp's online payment system surfaced in October 2014. Due to security gaps with hidden form elements, a Secure Sockets Layer Certificate, and Rightscorp permitting search engine indexing of secure pages; names and address of alleged infringers were publicly exposed including individuals that settled cases with Warner Bros and Miramax Films.

== Criticism ==
Issues have been raised with regard to Rightscorp's practices. Several court cases have ruled that Digital Millennium Copyright Act (DMCA) subpoenas do not require internet service providers (ISPs) to identify their users to the issuer of the subpoena; indeed, an ISP that does provide that information can face sanctions, as can the issuer of the subpoena. The notice sent by Rightscorp prevents a lawsuit for the specific download in the notice; however, because of the language in the notice, paying the settlement is an admission of guilt. Although Rightscorp is then unable to sue for that infringement, not only can they sue and press charges for subsequent downloads, but they have the original settlement as admission of guilt of previous infringement.

Comcast, the largest internet provider in the United States, has continually refused to forward Rightscorp's DMCA settlement notices in the form in which Rightscorp sends them. Comcast removes the threatening language and the settlement offer and instead simply forwards a letter to their customer that basically reads as an incident report.
