= Legion of Mary (disambiguation) =

Legion of Mary can refer to several things;

- Legion of Mary, a Catholic association founded in Dublin
- Legio Maria, a new religious movement in Kenya
- Legion of Mary (band), an American rock band
  - Legion of Mary: The Jerry Garcia Collection, Vol. 1, an album
