= Pure Jerry: Keystone Berkeley, September 1, 1974 =

Live album by Jerry Garcia and Merl Saunders Band
- Released: December 28, 2004
- Recorded: September 1, 1974
- Venues: The Keystone; Berkeley, California
- Genre: Rock
- Length: 220:17
- Label: Jerry Made

Merl Saunders and Jerry Garcia chronology
Fire Up Plus (1992)	Pure Jerry: Keystone Berkeley, September 1, 1974 (2004)	Legion of Mary: The Jerry Garcia Collection, Vol. 1 (2005)

Merl Saunders chronology
Still Groovin' (2004)	Pure Jerry: Keystone Berkeley, September 1, 1974 (2004)	Legion of Mary: The Jerry Garcia Collection, Vol. 1 (2005)

Jerry Garcia chronology
Pure Jerry: Lunt-Fontanne, New York City, The Best of the Rest, October 15–30, 1987 (2004)	Pure Jerry: Keystone Berkeley, September 1, 1974 (2004)	Pure Jerry: Merriweather Post Pavilion, September 1 & 2, 1989 (2005)

Pure Jerry: Keystone Berkeley, September 1, 1974 is a three-CD live album by the Jerry Garcia and Merl Saunders Band. It contains the complete concert performed at the Keystone in Berkeley, California, on September 1, 1974. The fourth in the Pure Jerry series of archival concert albums, it was released on December 28, 2004.

Pure Jerry: Keystone Berkeley features Jerry Garcia on guitar and vocals, Merl Saunders on keyboards and vocals, Martin Fierro on saxophone and flute, John Kahn on bass, and Paul Humphrey on drums. At this show, a trumpet player whose identity is no longer known sat in on some of the songs.

Some earlier sources referred to this band as Legion of Mary. However, later research showed that the name Legion of Mary was only used from December 1974 to July 1975, after Ron Tutt replaced Paul Humphrey as the band's drummer. A recording by that band is Legion of Mary: The Jerry Garcia Collection, Vol. 1. Released in August 2005, it contains selections from various concerts, recorded from December 1974 to July 1975, on two CDs. A second LOM album is Garcia Live Volume Three, released in October 2013 and recorded at two concerts in December 1974.

== Critical reception ==
Professional ratings
Review scores
Source	Rating
Allmusic	4/5 stars
The Music Box	5/5 stars

On Allmusic, Lindsay Planer wrote, "Within this context, Garcia's predilection and underrated jazz leanings are given plenty of room for some stretched-out exploratory excursions.... For the inclined, 2004's Pure Jerry: Keystone Berkeley, September 1, 1974 is a no-brainer, while the faithful might liken it unto aural manna for the masses. Curious parties won't leave disappointed, either."

In The Music Box, John Metzger wrote, "Granted, the set lists employed by any of the Garcia-Saunders projects didn't vary tremendously from one show to the next, and each was peppered with an organic blend of Bob Dylan-penned, Motown-germinated, jazz, blues, funk, reggae, and rock selections.... Not surprisingly, the end result of such improvisational mayhem could be a hit-and-miss affair, but for whatever reason, September 1, 1974 yielded a truly awesome, mind-blowing experience, one that rivaled the Grateful Dead's own astonishing sojourns.... In essence, the fourth chapter in the Pure Jerry series amounts to being a whirlwind tour de force that far and away surpasses not only the entirety of Jerry Garcia's solo canon, but also many of the Grateful Dead's own releases."

On Jambands.com, Benjy Eisen said, "Like most of his collaborations with the encyclopedic Merl Saunders, this particular Garcia project draws from the music that gave birth to rock n' roll, and really becomes a musical revue in that sense. With the Grateful Dead, Garcia forged new musical boundaries. With this band, he stops to consider heritage. And at a time when rock 'n' roll was young to begin with.... Interestingly, Garcia does not dominate all the jams here. The baton gets passed around frequently from guitar to horns to keyboards, and the game of musical chairs is executed skillfully, with leads chasing leads, and one instrument following the other. Hand-offs are exchanged generously and gracefully, with a true sense of musical conversation. The thrill of this release is in listening to the interplay, because that's where all the action is."

In Glide magazine, Susan J. Weiand wrote, "Martin Fierro's tasteful contributions on sax and flute are clear and true, and combined with the playing of the unnamed trumpet player add so much texture to the songs. Jerry's voice sounds fresh and youthful, his playing inspired and energetic, while Merl really delivers the soul with his organ and singing, and Kahn's bass and Humphrey's drums are steady. It is evident that Jerry loved playing in his side projects as much as he loved to play with the Grateful Dead. The mood is so relaxed and one can almost hear the glasses clinking at the bar, but the music delivers the Pure Jerry fix that Deadheads and other fans can really appreciate."

== Track listing ==
Disc 1

1. "Neighbor, Neighbor" (Alton Joseph Valier) – 8:46
2. "Keepers" (Merl Saunders, John Kahn) – 11:15
3. "Sitting in Limbo" (Jimmy Cliff, Guillermo Bright) – 12:50
4. "Favela" (Antônio Carlos Jobim) – 13:40
5. "Tough Mama" (Bob Dylan) – 7:14
6. "La La" (Martin Fierro) – 22:43

Disc 2

1. "Someday Baby" (Lightnin' Hopkins) – 9:52
2. "Think" (Jimmy McCracklin, Deadric Malone) – 7:09
3. "Roadrunner" (Brian Holland, Lamont Dozier, Eddie Holland) – 10:15
4. "The Harder They Come" (Cliff) – 13:21
5. "I Second That Emotion" (Smokey Robinson, Al Cleveland) – 14:35
6. "Going, Going, Gone" (Dylan) – 14:25

Disc 3

1. "Soul Roach" (Saunders, Ray Shanklin) – 10:32
2. "Mystery Train" (Sam Phillips, Junior Parker) – 12:51
3. "Wondering Why" (Saunders, Pam Carrier) – 15:53
4. "People Make the World Go Round" (Thom Bell, Linda Epstein) – 3:43
5. "Keystone Jam" (Jerry Garcia and Merl Saunders Band) – 15:16
6. "It's Too Late" (Chuck Willis) – 8:55
7. "The Night They Drove Old Dixie Down" – (Robbie Robertson) – 6:26

== Personnel ==
=== Musicians ===
- Jerry Garcia – guitar, vocals
- Merl Saunders – keyboards, vocals
- Martin Fierro – saxophone, flute, percussion
- John Kahn – bass
- Paul Humphrey – drums
- mystery artist – trumpet on some tracks

=== Production ===
- Executive producer: Christopher Sabec, Peter McQuaid
- Recording: Betty Cantor-Jackson
- Research, tape compilation: David Lemieux
- Engineer: Tom Flye
- Second engineer: Robert Gatley
- Mastering: John Cuniberti
- Album coordination: Jeff Adams
