= Pure Jerry: Theatre 1839, San Francisco, July 29 & 30, 1977 =

Live album by Jerry Garcia Band
- Released: June 1, 2004
- Recorded: July 29 – 30, 1977
- Genre: Rock
- Length: 198:37
- Label: Jerry Made

Jerry Garcia Band chronology
Shining Star (2001)	Pure Jerry: Theatre 1839, San Francisco, July 29 & 30, 1977 (2004)	After Midnight: Kean College, 2/28/80 (2004)

Jerry Garcia chronology
All Good Things: Jerry Garcia Studio Sessions (2004)	Pure Jerry: Theatre 1839, San Francisco, July 29 & 30, 1977 (2004)	After Midnight: Kean College, 2/28/80 (2004)

Pure Jerry: Theatre 1839, San Francisco, July 29 & 30, 1977 is an album by the Jerry Garcia Band. It was the first release in the Pure Jerry series of live recordings by Jerry Garcia and his various solo bands. As the title suggests, it was recorded on July 29 and 30, 1977, at Theatre 1839 in San Francisco, California. It was released on June 1, 2004.

The lineup of the Jerry Garcia Band featured on this recording had been together for 18 months. In addition to Garcia on guitar and vocals, the group included fellow Grateful Dead members Keith Godchaux on keyboards and Donna Jean Godchaux on vocals, along with John Kahn on bass and Ron Tutt on drums. Other albums recorded by this lineup are Don't Let Go, Garcia Live Volume Seven, and Garcia Live Volume 17.

The album includes one song, "Gomorrah", that would appear on the band's 1978 studio album Cats Under the Stars.

Pure Jerry: Theatre 1839 was reissued in July 2007 exclusively at Borders stores. This release features the same track listing with slight alterations to the color of the packaging.

== Recording and mastering ==
The back cover of Pure Jerry: Theatre 1839 says, "As the Jerry Garcia Band soundboard tapes of July 29 and 30, 1977 are incomplete, the CDs contained herein compile the best performances among those available. Please accept our assurance that every step has been taken to overcome the various challenges presented by 27-year-old 7½ i.p.s. reel tapes — mysterious interferences, frustrating omissions, and some sticky stuff of unknown origin — in order to transfer, edit, and master this music in a way that faithfully celebrates its original performance."

== Critical reception ==
Professional ratings
Review scores
Source	Rating
Allmusic	4/5 stars
The Music Box	3.5/5 stars

On Allmusic, Lindsay Planer said, "Immediately striking is how good the recordings sound, adding to the intimacy and presence of the band's musical communication. The set list reflects Garcia's own decidedly eclectic tastes in addition to the wider variety of styles afforded him, in contrast to his concurrent involvement with the Grateful Dead. Even the songs that were being played by both outfits, such as "Friend of the Devil" and "They Love Each Other", are rendered with significantly different energies. The combo likewise became an outlet for Garcia's lengthy and expressive improvisations, one of the unquestionable fortes of the guitarist's non-Dead endeavors. There are no compact arrangements, as each of the selections — consisting of classic R&B, rock, and reggae tunes — are thoroughly explored..."

In The Music Box, John Metzger wrote, "For certain, the bright, clean, crisp, and soulful sound of Garcia’s guitar sang proudly throughout the Theatre 1839 concerts, and no matter how far the relaxed grooves concocted by his backing band drifted out of focus, it was he who consistently put them back on target and guided them forward with his infectiously incendiary intensity. As he and pianist Keith Godchaux took turns twisting and turning the melodies — more often than not with a lighter-than-air touch that was simply divine — Kahn’s bass rumbled beneath the surface with a punctuated efficacy while Tutt steadfastly kept time with the understated precision of an atomic clock. Indeed, the first edition of Pure Jerry is a loose, inspired, fun-filled endeavor, and although it’s far from perfect, it also sounds just right, particularly whenever the collective takes flight on a mind-blowing journey across the heavens."

On All About Jazz, Doug Collette said, "Not surprisingly, Jerry's band at this time included Keith and Donna Godchaux, who had been part of the Dead retinue since early in the decade; their presence is notable for the admirable restraint displayed by the latter, especially as she chimes in on lovable covers such as the Temptations' [sic] "I Second That Emotion".... while the sturdy accompaniment Keith supplies here lacks some of the clarity and contrast of interplay with Jerry's guitar work as captured with the Dead, that's in large measure due to an important change in tone on Garcia's part: the tone of his guitar solos, fills and rhythm work, particularly on reggae covers including "Stir It Up" and "The Harder They Come", is earthier and warmer, with much less of a psychedelic edge."

On Jambands.com, John Patrick Gatta wrote, "If you're used to the fluid jams of sessions with Merl Saunders or Legion of Mary or the gospel-like fervor created by the last version of JGB, the pace, intimacy and space between the notes on these three discs (18 songs) becomes disconcerting. I'm ready to groove and this outfit does as well, but the members want to ease into it.... As the setlist goes deeper, the rhythms of the material meshed with mine, and began to make sense of it all. Disc three's handful of tunes then brings matters up towards a more familiar energetic level. The quietness and determined pace comes to highlight the musicianship.... Not only does [the album] offer a sense of discovery by providing a rarely heard ensemble in their live element but it catches Garcia casually throwing off bolts of brilliance in a manner that unites him and the music."

== Set lists ==
The complete set lists for the 2 shows at Theatre 1839 were:

1977-07-29

Set 1: Sugaree, They Love Each Other, Russian Lullaby*, That's What Love Will Make You Do*, Stir It Up*, Simple Twist Of Fate*, Mystery Train*

Set 2: The Way You Do The Things You Do*, Catfish John*, Gomorrah, Tore Up Over You, Friend Of The Devil*, Don't Let Go*, The Night They Drove Old Dixie Down*

1977-07-30

Set 1: Let It Rock, Stop That Train, Mystery Train, Knockin' On Heaven's Door, They Love Each Other*, I Second That Emotion*

Set 2: The Way You Do The Things You Do, Let Me Roll It*, Simple Twist Of Fate, The Harder They Come*, Gomorrah*, Tore Up Over You*, Tangled Up In Blue*

Encore: My Sisters And Brothers*

- appears on Pure Jerry: Theatre 1839, San Francisco, July 29 & 30, 1977

== Track listing ==
Disc one

July 29, 1977:

1. "Mystery Train" (Junior Parker, Sam Phillips) — 10:19
2. "Russian Lullaby" (Irving Berlin) — 12:52
3. "That's What Love Will Make You Do" (James Banks, Eddie Marion, Henderson Thigpen) — 11:33
4. "Stir It Up" (Bob Marley) — 12:41
5. "Simple Twist of Fate" (Bob Dylan) — 9:29
6. "The Way You Do the Things You Do" (Smokey Robinson, Bobby Rogers) — 9:51
7. "Catfish John" (Bob McDill, Allen Reynolds) — 11:58

Disc two

July 29, 1977:

1. "Friend of the Devil" (John Dawson, Robert Hunter, Jerry Garcia) — 8:54
2. "Don't Let Go" (Jesse Stone) — 27:00
3. "The Night They Drove Old Dixie Down" (Robbie Robertson) — 9:49

July 30, 1977:

4. "They Love Each Other" (Hunter, Garcia) — 7:22
5. "I Second That Emotion" (Robinson) — 10:27
6. "Let Me Roll It" (Paul McCartney) — 9:15

Disc three

July 30, 1977:

1. "The Harder They Come" (Jimmy Cliff) — 12:43
2. "Gomorrah" (Hunter, Garcia) — 6:39
3. "Tore Up Over You" (Hank Ballard) — 9:43
4. "Tangled Up in Blue" (Dylan) — 10:18
5. "My Sisters and Brothers" (Charles Johnson) — 7:44

== Personnel ==
=== Jerry Garcia Band ===
- Jerry Garcia – guitar, vocals
- Donna Jean Godchaux – vocals
- Keith Godchaux – keyboards, vocals
- John Kahn – bass
- Ron Tutt – drums, vocals

=== Production ===
- Executive producers – Christopher Sabec, Peter McQuaid
- Recording – Betty Cantor-Jackson
- Production supervisor – Tom Flye
- Mastering – Paul Stubblebine
- Tape research – David Lemieux
- Photography – Jonathan Hyams
