= Pure Jerry: Merriweather Post Pavilion, September 1 & 2, 1989 =

Live album by Jerry Garcia Band
- Released: March 25, 2005
- Recorded: September 1–2, 1989
- Genre: Rock, rhythm and blues
- Length: 228:14
- Label: Jerry Made

Jerry Garcia Band chronology
Pure Jerry: Lunt-Fontanne, New York City, The Best of the Rest, October 15–30, 1987 (2004)	Pure Jerry: Merriweather Post Pavilion, September 1 & 2, 1989 (2005)	Pure Jerry: Warner Theatre, March 18, 1978 (2005)

Jerry Garcia chronology
Pure Jerry: Keystone Berkeley, September 1, 1974 (2004)	Pure Jerry: Merriweather Post Pavilion, September 1 & 2, 1989 (2005)	Legion of Mary: The Jerry Garcia Collection, Vol. 1 (2005)

Pure Jerry: Merriweather Post Pavilion, September 1 & 2, 1989 is a four-CD live album by the Jerry Garcia Band. It contains two complete concerts, recorded on September 1 and 2, 1989, at the Merriweather Post Pavilion in Columbia, Maryland. The fifth in the Pure Jerry series of archival concert albums, it was released on March 25, 2005.

The lineup of the Jerry Garcia Band for these concerts – and for many of the band's concerts from 1985 to 1995 – was Jerry Garcia on guitar and vocals, Melvin Seals on keyboards, John Kahn on bass, David Kemper on drums, and Jaclyn LaBranch and Gloria Jones on backing vocals.

== Critical reception ==
Professional ratings
Review scores
Source	Rating
Allmusic	4.5/5 stars
The Music Box	4/5 stars

On Allmusic, Lindsay Planer said, "The lineup heard here was the longest running incarnation of the Jerry Garcia Band... By the late '80s Garcia and company had matured from the smaller intimacy of concert bars and theater-sized venues to easily filling sheds (read: amphitheaters). The boost in popularity could possibly be attributed to the level of musicianship that audiences were consistently treated to. In fact, the consensus among seasoned Deadheads and Garcia aficionados was that his work outside the increasingly cumbersome Grateful Dead scene was often better and more inspired. Pure Jerry: Merriweather Post Pavilion, September 1 & 2, 1989 offers nearly four hours of evidence to support their claims."

In The Music Box, John Metzger said, "... by 1989, the [Grateful Dead] once again was performing as a formidably cohesive unit. Naturally, this positive turn of events affected the Jerry Garcia Band, too.... One certainly could quibble that perhaps the Merriweather Post Pavilion concerts might have been better represented by a compilation-style effort... Yet, there also is something to be said for releasing shows intact, if only because concerts by the Jerry Garcia Band, much like those by the Grateful Dead, contained a unique ebb and flow, and plucking songs out of context, more often than not, seriously diminishes the group's carefully constructed continuity.... while Shining Star remains a more pristine representation of the latter day Jerry Garcia Band, Pure Jerry Volume 5 is also a very worthy endeavor..."

In Glide magazine, Chad Berndtson wrote, "This latest, four-disc collection — full, uncut recordings of a legitimately magical pair of warm September nights just north of Washington D.C. — might be the best all around [Pure Jerry] release yet.... For a short time in the late 1980s, before its own decline — parallel (and far less laboriously) to the Grateful Dead's in the early 1990s — the Jerry Garcia Band transcended its own glorious casualness and became an A-level exploratory outfit.... If other JGB releases have more moments of individual, isolated fireworks, as Jerry's playing is a bit less intense (though hardly subdued) throughout this pair, this one is consistent as hell as a listenable document."

On Jambands.com, John Patrick Gatta said, "Historically, it is significant because these JGB gigs came after a strong summer tour with the Grateful Dead... So, it's no surprise that [Garcia's] good spirits are reflected throughout the onstage interaction. There's a lively, confident pace to the arrangements.... All 28 tracks (with only one repeat over the two concerts) display this outfit's sense of swing and seamless merge of rock, R&B, gospel and reggae.

== Track listing ==
Disc 1

September 1, 1989 – first set

1. "How Sweet It Is (To Be Loved by You)" (Brian Holland, Lamont Dozier, Eddie Holland) – 6:16
2. "Stop That Train" (Peter Tosh) – 6:41
3. "Get Out of My Life, Woman" (Allen Toussaint) – 7:29
4. "Run for the Roses" (Jerry Garcia, Robert Hunter) – 5:26
5. "Like a Road Leading Home" (Don Nix, Dan Penn) – 8:37
6. "My Sisters and Brothers" (Charles Johnson) – 4:16
7. "Deal" (Garcia, Hunter) – 6:53

Disc 2

September 1, 1989 – second set

1. "The Harder They Come" (Jimmy Cliff) – 10:40
2. "Mission in the Rain" (Garcia, Hunter) – 9:11
3. Band introduction – 0:37
4. "Think" (Jimmy McCracklin, Deadric Malone) – 7:21
5. "Mississippi Moon" (Peter Rowan) – 8:37
6. "Waiting for a Miracle" (Bruce Cockburn) – 5:38
7. "That Lucky Old Sun" (Beasley Smith, Haven Gillespie) – 10:18
8. "Tangled Up in Blue" (Bob Dylan) – 10:40

Disc 3

September 2, 1989 – first set

1. "I'll Take a Melody" (Toussaint) – 10:43
2. "They Love Each Other" (Garcia, Hunter) – 6:54
3. "Forever Young" (Dylan) – 8:31
4. "That's What Love Will Make You Do" (James Banks, Eddie Marion, Henderson Thigpen) – 8:33
5. "Knockin' on Heaven's Door" (Dylan) – 10:27
6. "And It Stoned Me" (Van Morrison) – 6:22
7. "Midnight Moonlight" (Rowan) – 6:56

Disc 4

September 2, 1989 – second set

1. "Cats Under the Stars" (Garcia, Hunter) – 8:54
2. "Waiting for a Miracle" (Cockburn) – 6:54
3. "Simple Twist of Fate" (Dylan) – 12:53
4. "Evangeline" (David Hidalgo, Louie Pérez) – 3:46
5. "The Night They Drove Old Dixie Down" – (Robbie Robertson) – 10:14
6. "Don't Let Go" (Jesse Stone) – 18:27

== Personnel ==
=== Jerry Garcia Band ===
- Jerry Garcia – guitar, vocals
- Melvin Seals – keyboards
- John Kahn – bass
- David Kemper – drums
- Jaclyn LaBranch – vocals
- Gloria Jones – vocals

=== Production ===
- Executive producer: Christopher Sabec, Peter McQuaid
- Recording: John Cutler
- Research, additional recording: David Lemieux
- Engineer: Tom Flye
- Second engineer: Robert Gatley
- Mastering: Joe Gastwirt
- Research and compilation: Blair Jackson, David Gans
- Album coordination: Jeff Adams
