= Universal Amphitheatre =

Indoor amphitheater, formerly located at Universal Studios Hollywood

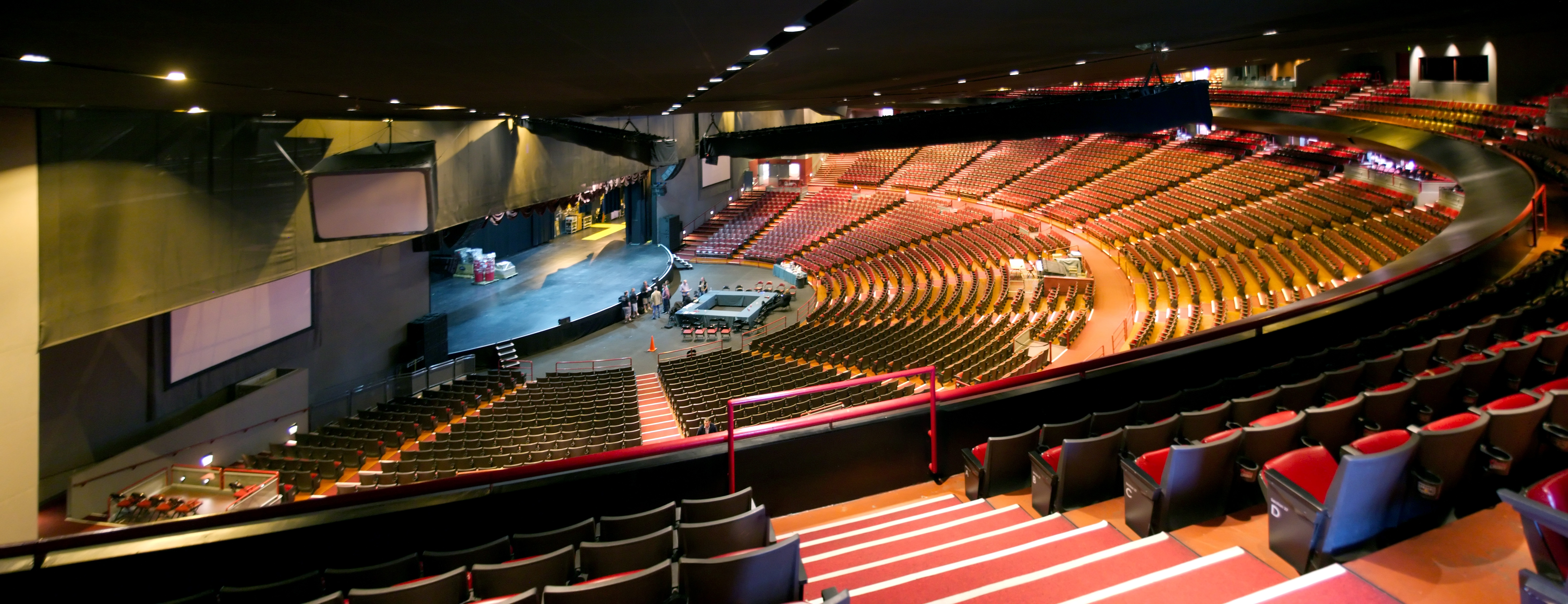
- Universal Amphitheatre in 2007
- Interactive map of Universal Amphitheatre
- Former names: Universal Amphitheatre (1972–2005); Gibson Amphitheatre (2005–2013)
- Address: 100 Universal City Plaza, Los Angeles, California, U.S.
- Location: Universal City, Universal Studios Hollywood
- Coordinates: 34°08′17.50″N 118°21′11.64″W
- Owner: Universal Destinations & Experiences
- Capacity: 6,251
- Type: Amphitheater

Construction
- Built: 1969–1972
- Renovated: 1982
- Closed: September 6, 2013
- Demolished: September 25, 2013

Universal Amphitheatre (later known as Gibson Amphitheatre) was an indoor amphitheater located in Los Angeles, California, within Universal City. It was built as an outdoor venue, opening in the summer of 1972 with a production of Jesus Christ Superstar. It was remodeled and converted into an indoor theater in 1982 to improve acoustics. The amphitheater closed on September 6, 2013, and was demolished for The Wizarding World of Harry Potter attraction at Universal Studios Hollywood.

== Early history ==
The amphitheater was built as a daytime arena where patrons of the Universal Studios Studio Tour could watch stuntmen perform a western-themed stunt show and shootout. Construction began in 1969. By 1970, the stage was completed and three old west facades were constructed for the show. The arena was completed in 1971.

Because it was empty at night, a young studio tour guide suggested that the arena be used to hold rock concerts. On June 28, 1972, the venue hosted its first concert, a production of the Broadway rock musical Jesus Christ Superstar. The show was a hit and was extended until cold weather forced its closure.

During its early years, the stunt show was performed during the day while at night the venue hosted concerts. The theater proved to be so popular that it regularly filled to 98% capacity. After one year, the studio was expanded to seat 5,200 patrons.

The Amphitheatre was host to three appearances by the Grateful Dead in summer 1973, and two further performances by the Jerry Garcia Band on May 22, 1989 and July 29, 1992 - one of the tracks from the latter concert appeared on Shining Star (Jerry Garcia Band album).

The venue was the site of various live album recordings, beginning with Joni Mitchell's Miles of Aisles from August 14 to 17, 1974 and John Denver's An Evening with John Denver from August 26 to September 1, 1974. On September 9, 1978, The Blues Brothers band performed live and recorded their album, Briefcase Full of Blues.

In 1980, the venue closed for two years for a major renovation. A roof was constructed to enable year-round entertainment. Acoustics were improved and seating was expanded again to 6,251 seats.

On September 15, 1987, singer Tony Melendez sang "Never be the Same" while playing the guitar with his feet in a special performance for Pope John Paul II as part of the pope's two-day visit to Los Angeles.

The Universal Amphitheatre hosted the Late Night with David Letterman 8th Anniversary special in 1990.

From 1991 to 2002, it served as the ceremony venue for the Academy of Country Music Awards.

In May 1993, Universal added the CityWalk shopping and dining district around the entrance to the theater, allowing patrons to seek refreshments before and after concerts.

On July 29 and 30, 1999, pop/R&B singer Whitney Houston gave her last two North American concerts at the theater on her My Love Is Your Love World Tour. Houston would go on to have one more world tour from 2009 to 2010, but avoided North American venues.

== Name change ==
The theater was known as the Universal Amphitheatre from its inception until early 2005, when naming rights were acquired by the Gibson Guitar Corporation as part of a partnership among Gibson, Universal and House of Blues.

== Closure ==
On December 6, 2011, it was announced that Universal Amphitheatre would close and would be demolished to make way for The Wizarding World of Harry Potter theme park area at Universal Studios Hollywood.

Although the venue had events scheduled until October 2013, it officially closed in September of that year.

The last "rock 'n roll" concert at the Gibson Amphitheatre was performed by Glenn Danzig on August 30, 2013. Concert shirts sold that evening proclaim "Farewell Universal!" printed on the back as well as a list of his prior performance dates at the beloved venue.

The final performance held at the Gibson Amphitheatre was Pepe Aguilar on September 6, 2013.

At the time of its closure, it was the third largest mid-sized venue in California, behind the Nokia Theatre and the Shrine Auditorium - two other Los Angeles venues. The amphitheater was demolished on September 25, 2013.

== See also ==
- List of contemporary amphitheatres
