= Sergei Lemberg =

American attorney

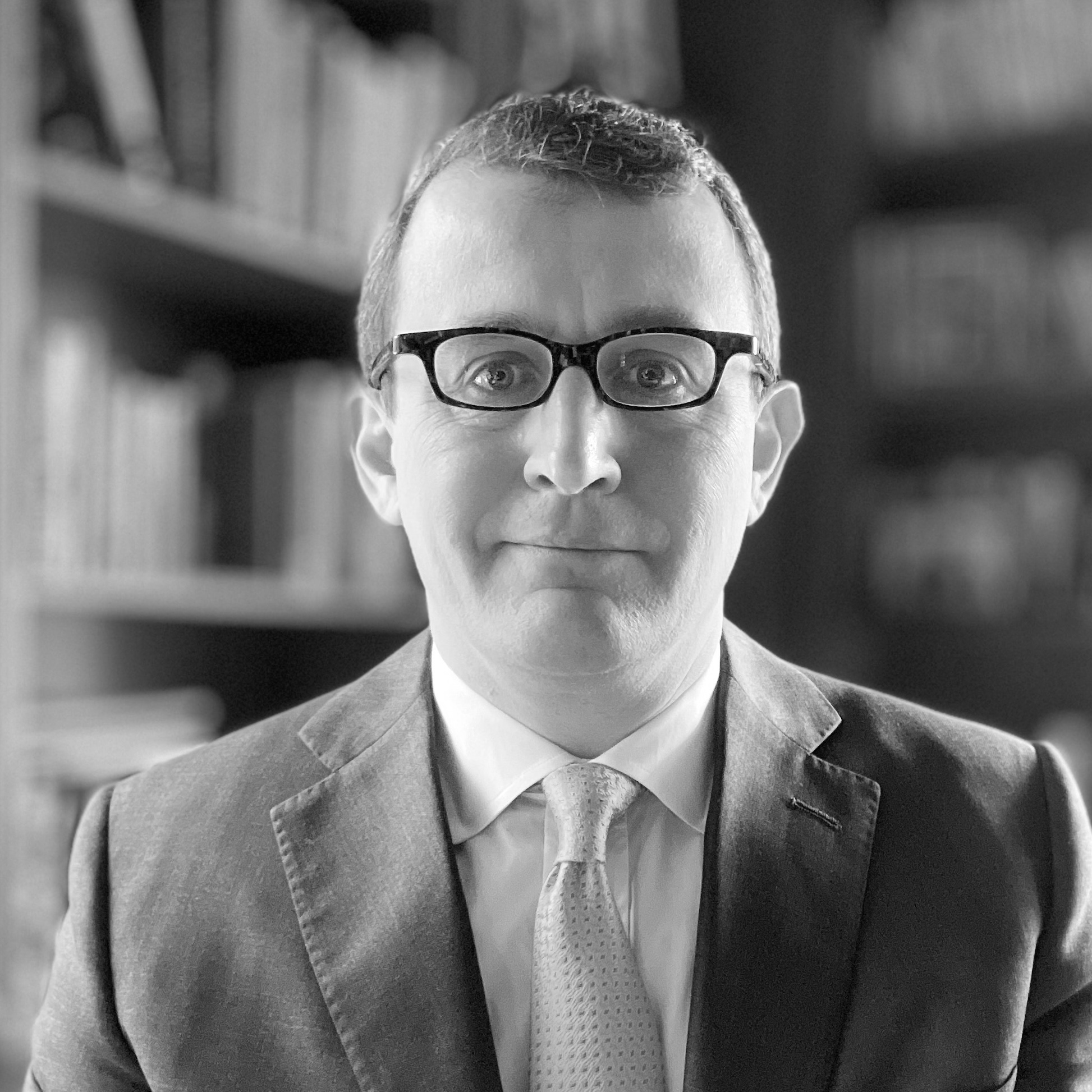
Sergei Lemberg, Esq.

Sergei Lemberg is a consumer rights attorney, practicing since 2006. He is known for a United States Supreme Court case (Facebook v. Duguid) defending consumers from autodialers under the Telephone Consumer Protection Act of 1991 to send unsolicited text messages. He filed the first known lawsuit to involve an autonomous car crash, and others.

Lemberg's firm also prosecutes overtime violators and food marketers. It has filed hundreds of cases a month against robocallers, and automotive lemon manufacturers.
