= Martin Fierro (saxophonist) =

American saxophonist (1942–2008)

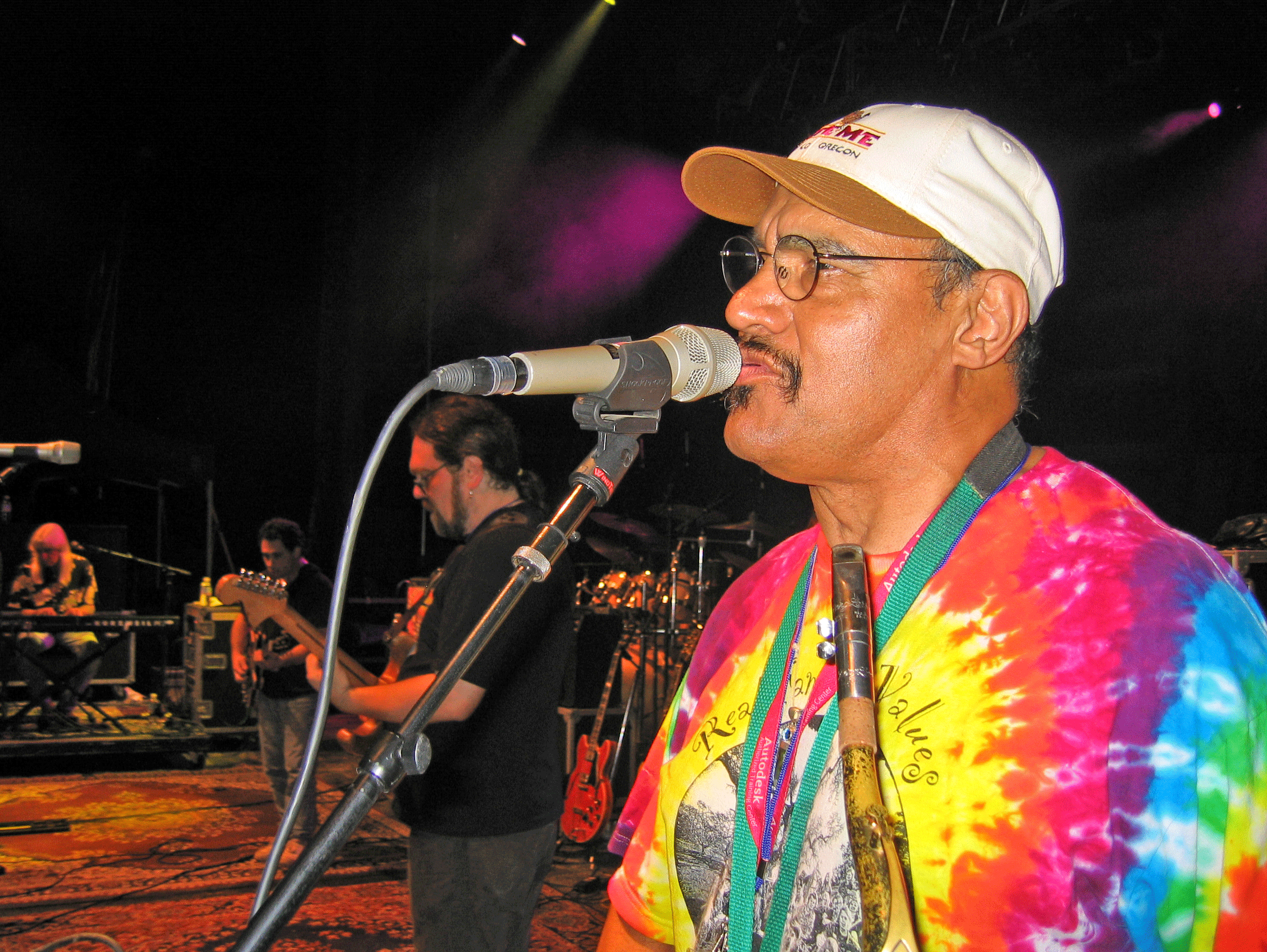
- Fierro in August 2005

Background information
- Born: January 18, 1942; Mexico
- Died: March 13, 2008 (aged 66) Marin County, California, U.S.
- Genres: Rock, jam band, jazz rock
- Occupations: Musician, songwriter, record producer
- Instruments: Saxophone, flute
- Years active: 1960–2005

Martin Fierro (January 18, 1942 – March 13, 2008) was an American saxophonist who played with the Sir Douglas Quintet, Quicksilver Messenger Service, Legion of Mary with Jerry Garcia, and Zero with Steve Kimock. He is the father of actor David Fierro.

== Early life ==
Fierro was born in Mexico in 1942, and grew up in El Paso, Texas. He pronounced his name Mar-TEEN. He taught himself how to play saxophone and as a teenager participated in rock bands.

== Career ==
Fierro concentrated on jazz in his early 20s. He toured Mexico with a band, then moved to San Francisco and joined Mother Earth, a blues rock group led by Tracy Nelson. He became a member of the rock band the Sir Douglas Quintet in 1968. He also played with Quicksilver Messenger Service and James Cotton.

In 1971, Fierro played saxophone and flute on Hooteroll?, an instrumental, free-form album by guitarist Jerry Garcia and keyboard player Howard Wales. Three years later he joined another project by Garcia known as Legion of Mary. Like Garcia's Grateful Dead, Legion of Mary combined rock and blues with long improvisation. He appeared on the Dead's album Wake of the Flood in 1973 and toured with them that year.

In 1984, Fierro joined the Bay Area Jam Band Zero alongside founding members Steve Kimock, Bobby Vega, John Cipollina, and Greg Anton. The band is generally regarded as one of the foundational examples that pioneered the jam band style of playing. His tenure with the band would garner praise and even more affirmation of his improvisational prowess. In later years he played with the jam bands the String Cheese Incident and the Dark Star Orchestra. He also played local San Francisco Bay Area gigs with his Martin Fierro Jazz Quartet.

== Death ==
He was diagnosed with cancer and died in Marin County, California, on March 13, 2008, at age 66.

== Discography ==
With James Cotton

- 1968 Cut You Loose!

With Mother Earth

- 1968 Living with the Animals
- 1968 Revolution

With Shades Of Joy

- 1969 Shades Of Joy
- 1970 Music Of El Topo

With Sir Douglas Quintet

- 1969 Mendocino
- 1970 1+1+1=4
- 1973 Texas Tornado

With Quicksilver Messenger Service

- 1970 What About Me
- 1986 Peace by Piece

With Jerry Garcia

- 1971 Hooteroll?
- 1973 Wake of the Flood
- 1997 The Songs of Jimmie Rodgers: A Tribute
- 2004 Pure Jerry: Keystone Berkeley, September 1, 1974
- 2005 Legion of Mary: The Jerry Garcia Collection, Vol. 1
- 2005 Garcia Plays Dylan
- 2013 Garcia Live Volume Three
- 2018 Garcia Live Volume Nine
- 2020 Garcia Live Volume 15
- 2022 Garcia Live Volume 18

With Merl Saunders

- 1997 Keepers

With Zero

- 1987 Nothin' Goes Here
- 1991 Live: Go Hear Nothin'
- 1994 Chance in a Million
- 1997 Zero Zero
- 1998 Nothin' Lasts Forever
- 2002 Double Zero Zero

With Rory Gallagher

- 2011 Notes from San Francisco (on tracks 1 and 8 – recorded in 1978)

With the String Cheese Incident

- 2004 On the Road: 12-08-03 Redwood City, California
