= Hooteroll? =

Studio album by Howard Wales and Jerry Garcia
- Released: November 1, 1971
- Genre: Jazz fusion
- Length: 34:15
- Label: Douglas Records
- Producers: Alan Douglas; Doris Dynamite

Howard Wales and Jerry Garcia chronology
Hooteroll? (1971)	Side Trips, Volume One (1998)

Jerry Garcia chronology
New Riders of the Purple Sage (1971)	Hooteroll? (1971)	Garcia (1972)

Professional ratings
Review scores
Source	Rating
Allmusic	4/5 stars
Allmusic	3/5 stars
Christgau's Record Guide	C+
Rolling Stone	(not rated)
The Village Voice	C+

Hooteroll? is a jazz-rock fusion album by Howard Wales and Jerry Garcia.

Prior to making Hooteroll?, Wales and Garcia had played together at Monday night jam sessions at The Matrix in San Francisco. Wales had also played organ on several tracks of the Grateful Dead album American Beauty.

Hooteroll? features a few musicians who later played in Jerry Garcia side projects — John Kahn (Jerry Garcia Band and many other Garcia related groups), Bill Vitt (Merl Saunders and Jerry Garcia), and Martin Fierro (Legion of Mary).

== Cover ==
The cover art is a painting by Abdul Mati Klarwein titled Saint John. The same painting is also on the cover of the Jam & Spoon album Kaleidoscope. Other paintings by Klarwein were used for the cover and gatefold art of the Miles Davis album Bitches Brew, as well as Santana's album Abraxas.

== Different versions of the album ==
Hooteroll? was originally released in 1971 as an LP on the Douglas Records label. In 1987 it was released on CD and cassette by Rykodisc Records. This version of the album has a markedly different track listing from the LP, with two songs added, one removed and the remaining tracks from the original LP in a different order. In 1992 the CD was reissued by Grateful Dead Records. On September 14, 2010, Douglas Records reissued the album again, restoring the missing track "A Trip to What Next" (and retaining the two added to the 1987 CD), and adding two live bonus tracks from the Palace Theatre in Providence, Rhode Island recorded on January 28, 1972. The song "Da Birg Song" is listed on this version as "Da Bird Song". Also, the song "DC-502" had a 0:44 keyboard intro on the original vinyl LP which was cut on the CD versions.

== Track listing ==
All compositions are by Howard Wales, except "South Side Strut" by Martin Fierro and Howard Wales and "Da Birg Song" by Jerry Garcia and Howard Wales.

=== LP track listing ===
Side 1

1. "South Side Strut" – 5:38
2. "A Trip to What Next" – 7:28
3. "Up from the Desert" – 3:03

Side 2

1. "DC-502" – 4:24
2. "One A.M. Approach" – 4:39
3. "Uncle Martin's" – 3:09
4. "Da Birg Song" – 2:35

=== 1987 CD track listing ===
1. "Morning in Marin" – 6:59
2. "Da Birg Song" – 2:37
3. "South Side Strut" – 5:39
4. "Up from the Desert" – 3:03
5. "DC-502" – 3:38
6. "One A.M. Approach" – 4:39
7. "Uncle Martin's" – 3:39
8. "Evening in Marin" – 4:09

=== 2010 CD track listing ===
1. "Morning in Marin" – 7:05
2. "Da Bird Song" – 2:43
3. "South Side Strut" – 5:45
4. "Up from the Desert" – 3:08
5. "A Trip to What Next" – 7:26
6. "DC-502" – 3:45
7. "One A.M. Approach" – 4:45
8. "Uncle Martin's" – 3:15
9. "Evening in Marin" – 4:18
10. "She Once Lived Here" (live, 1972) – 4:48
11. "Sweet Cocaine" (live, 1972) – 12:49

== Personnel ==
=== Musicians ===
- Howard Wales – organ, piano
- Jerry Garcia – guitar
- Curly Cook (James Curley Cooke) – rhythm guitar
- John Kahn – bass
- Bill Vitt – drums
- Michael Marinelli – drums
- Ken Balzall – trumpet
- Martin Fierro – saxophone, flute
- Jim Vincent – guitar (live tracks 10–11 on 2010 reissue)
- Roger "Jelly Roll" Torres – bass, vocals (live tracks 10–11 on 2010 reissue)
- Jerry Love – drums (live tracks 10–11 on 2010 reissue)

=== Production ===
- Produced by: Alan Douglas and Doris Dynamite
- Horn arrangements: Martin Fierro
- Recording engineer: Russ Geary
- Mixing engineer: Tony Bongiovi
- Cover painting: Abdul Mati
- Photographs: Ron Rakow
- CD digital mastering: Joe Gastwirt
- CD package design: J.E. Tully
