= Facebook, Inc. v. Duguid =

Facebook Inc. v. Duguid
- Supreme Court of the United States

Argued December 8, 2020 Decided April 1, 2021
- Full case name: Facebook, Inc. v. Noah Duguid, et al.
- Docket no.: 19-511
- Citations: 592 U.S. 395 (more) 141 S. Ct. 1163; 209 L. Ed. 2d 272

Case history
- Prior: Motion to dismiss granted, Duguid v. Facebook, Inc., No. 3:15-cv-00985, 2017 WL 635117 (N.D. Cal. Feb. 16, 2017); Reversed and remanded, 926 F.3d 1146 (9th Cir. 2019); Cert. granted, Facebook, Inc. v. Duguid, 141 S. Ct. 193 (July 9, 2020)
- Subsequent: Remanded, Duguid v. Facebook, Inc., 847 F. App'x 464 (9th Cir. 2021)

Questions presented
- Whether the definition of automatic telephone dialing system in the Telephone Consumer Protection Act of 1991 encompasses any device that can "store" and "automatically dial" telephone numbers, even if the device does not "us[e] a random or sequential number generator".

Holding
- To qualify as an "automatic telephone dialing system" under the TCPA, a device must have the capacity either to store a telephone number using a random or sequential number generator, or to produce a telephone number using a random or sequential number generator

Court membership
- Chief Justice John Roberts Associate Justices Clarence Thomas · Stephen Breyer; Samuel Alito · Sonia Sotomayor; Elena Kagan · Neil Gorsuch; Brett Kavanaugh · Amy Coney Barrett

Case opinions
- Majority: Sotomayor, joined by Roberts, Thomas, Breyer, Kagan, Gorsuch, Kavanaugh, Barrett
- Concurrence: Alito (in judgment)

Laws applied
- Telephone Consumer Protection Act of 1991 (TCPA)

Facebook, Inc. v. Duguid, 592 U.S. 395 (2021), was a United States Supreme Court case related to the definition and function of auto dialers under the Telephone Consumer Protection Act of 1991 (TCPA) to send unsolicited text messages. In a unanimous decision based on statutory interpretation of the TCPA, the Supreme Court ruled that auto dialers are defined by their function to either store or produce telephone numbers from a random or sequential number generator.

== Background ==
The Telephone Consumer Protection Act of 1991 (TCPA) was passed to cut down the number of unsolicited calls that consumers were receiving. Among its provisions, the TCPA disallowed the use of automated dialers from being used to contact consumers through services that may cost the consumer money, such as through cell phones or text messaging, with violations assessed and fined by the Federal Communications Commission (FCC). Amendments have been made to the TCPA; relevant to this case was an amendment added in 2015 that exempted automated calls made to pay-for consumer lines for federal debt collection purposes. Since its inception, this "autodialer" provision of the TCPA has been challenged as a violation of free speech rights under the First Amendment of the United States Constitution, but the federal Circuit Courts have generally upheld all challenges to the statute. The 2015 amendment created a new line of arguments to challenge the autodialer statute of the TCPA as it carved out an exception for one type of speech and making the whole statute fundamentally content-based and unconstitutional. Concurrent to this case, the judicial proceedings of Barr v. American Assn. of Political Consultants, Inc., one of the direct challenges to the 2015 amendment that sought to invalidate the autodialer statute of the TCPA, began working its way to the Supreme Court.

Starting in 2014, Noah Duguid began receiving text messages on his cell phone from Facebook warning him about suspicious account activity, despite the fact he had not set up a Facebook account. Duguid reached out to Facebook to rectify the situation, but Facebook did nothing to stop the messages. Duguid filed a class-action lawsuit in the United States District Court for the Northern District of California in March 2015, asserting that Facebook violated the autodialer statute of the TCPA because the messages he received were being placed by an automatic telephone dialing system (ATDS) and seeking US$1,500 for each message he had received. Facebook objected to the lawsuit, challenging both Duguid's claim that their notification system for logic security was an ATDS, as the messages sent were targeted to specific phone numbers and not the sequential or random number behavior associated with ATDS, and asserting that the autodialer statute of the TCPA with the 2015 amendment was a content-based speech restriction that violated the First Amendment. Due to the latter complaint, the federal government injected itself into the case to seek its dismissal in favor of Facebook as to protect the constitutionality of the TCPA. The judge agreed on the case's dismissal, ruling in Facebook's favor that Duguid had failed to show that Facebook's logic security notification system qualified as an ATDS.

Duguid appealed to the United States Court of Appeals for the Ninth Circuit. Facebook's defense was again joined by the federal government in interest of protecting the constitutionality of the TCPA statute. Though Facebook reasserted its stance that their notification system was not an ATDS, the Ninth Circuit had precedence from Marks v. Crunch San Diego, LLC that an ATDS was not limited to devices that dialed numbers sequentially or randomly, but also include those that could dial stored numbers, and that it categorically fit a device that sends "automated, unsolicited, and unwanted" messages to consumers. The Ninth Circuit thus ruled in Duguid's favor in that Facebook had used an ATDS and proceeded then to evaluate the First Amendment challenge to the autodialer statute raised by Facebook. In this, the Ninth Circuit determined that the 2015 amendment did add content-based exemptions for free speech and thus was unconstitutional, but was also severable from the rest of the TCPA, leaving in place the autodialer statute. As such, the Circuit Court ruled in favor of Duguid and that Facebook had violated the autodialer statute of the TCPA.

== Supreme Court ==
Facebook petitioned to the Supreme Court, seeking judgement on two questions: whether the auto dialer statute was an unconstitutional content-based restriction on free speech, and whether the TCPA definition of an ATDS includes any device that can store and dial stored numbers. In the latter case, Facebook identified that the Ninth Circuit's ruling had established a split circuit with a ruling out of the United States Court of Appeals for the Third Circuit. On July 6, 2020, the Supreme Court issued its judgement in Barr v. American Assn. of Political Consultants, Inc. which affirmed that the 2015 amendment to the TCPA was unconstitutional but was also severable from the TCPA. The Court subsequently certified Facebook's case, but limited the case to the second question on the definition of an ATDS.

The Supreme Court held oral arguments on December 8, 2020. In oral hearings, the Justices debated on the statutory interpretation of the law with Duguid's counsel, Bryan A. Garner, one of the experts in the areas of law and grammatical interpretation.

The Court issued its unanimous decision on April 1, 2021, reversing the Ninth Circuit's latest ruling and remanding the case for further review. The majority opinion was written by Justice Sonia Sotomayor and joined by all except Justice Samuel Alito, who wrote a concurring opinion. The Court found that under a statutory interpretation of the TCPA, the dialing system used by Facebook did not qualify as an "automatic telephone dialing system", and stated that only systems that "have the capacity either to store a telephone number using a random or sequential number generator", or that "produce a telephone number using a random or sequential number generator" can qualify as an automatic dialer under the TCPA. Sotomayor wrote that "Congress’ chosen definition of an autodialer requires that the equipment in question must use a random or sequential number generator. That definition excludes equipment like Facebook's login notification system, which does not use such technology." Sotomayor further wrote "Congress found autodialer technology harmful because autodialers can dial emergency lines randomly or tie up all of the sequentially numbered phone lines at a single entity. Facebook's interpretation of [the TCPA] better matches the scope of the TCPA to these specific concerns. Duguid's interpretation, on the other hand, would encompass any equipment that stores and dials telephone numbers."

== Impact ==
The Supreme Court's ruling was seen to be favorable to the telemarketing industry, since the decision narrowed the definition of an automatic dialing system of which are regulated under the TCPA. As few actual automated dialers in use at the time of the decision incorporate the random or sequential number generator, telemarketers would be able to use other automatic dialing systems that do not meet this definition to engage in their business, according to the National Consumer Law Center. The National Consumer Law Center as well as Consumer Reports expressed concern that there would be a significant increase in unwanted telemarketing calls due to this decision.

Senator Ed Markey, one of the authors of the TCPA, along with Representative Anna Eshoo, called the ruling "disastrous", as the Congressional intent of the TCPA was "to ban dialing from a database", and announced the same day of the decision that they would be looking to introduce amended legislation to address the Court's decision.
