= Everybody Needs Somebody to Love =

Single by Solomon Burke
- B-side: "Looking for My Baby"
- Released: July 1964
- Recorded: May 28, 1964
- Genre: Rhythm and blues; soul
- Label: Atlantic (2241)
- Songwriters: Jerry Wexler; Bert Berns; Solomon Burke
- Producer: Bert Berns

Solomon Burke singles chronology
"Goodbye Baby (Baby Goodbye)" (1964)	"Everybody Needs Somebody to Love" (1964)	"Yes I Do" (1964)

"Everybody Needs Somebody to Love" is a song written by Bert Berns, Solomon Burke, and Jerry Wexler, and originally recorded by Burke under the production of Berns at Atlantic Records in 1964. Burke's version charted in 1964, but missed the US top 40, peaking at number 58.

The song is ranked number 429 on the Rolling Stone magazine's list of The 500 Greatest Songs of All Time.

== Composition and recording ==
On May 28, 1964, Burke recorded "Everybody Needs Somebody to Love" (Atlantic 2241), written by Burke (but also credited to Bert Berns and Jerry Wexler), which was Burke's most prominent bid for an enduring soul standard. Burke claims he was the sole writer on the song but was talked into sharing credit by Wexler and Berns.

In an interview Burke recalled the song's origins: "I used to do it in church when I was a kid and it was a march for the offering. We would play it with tubas, trombones and the big bass drum and it sounded really joyful. I played it to Jerry Wexler and Bert Berns, who thought that it was too fast, and had the wrong tempo."

In August 2008, Burke recalled that he had hired musicians from Charlotte, North Carolina, to play at a gig on Long Island and he drafted them in to play the instrumental riff on "Everybody Needs Somebody to Love". Burke described the recording: "Got the band cooking, get a bit of echo, we went through it, came back out, said to Jerry [Wexler], 'Whaddya think?' He said, 'Too fast. Doesn't have any meaning.' (Engineer) Tommy (Dowd) says, 'What can we lose? His band's here, let's just cut it.'" In this song, Burke employs the style of a black preacher, in "which he begins by delivering his message in a style of a sermon, and offering salvation".

Dave Marsh explains that in this song, "the porcine, gilt-fingered lay preacher testifies from the top but what you ought to hear is writ large between the lines, especially in the stentorian opening sermon. That is, when Burke sings "[There's a song I sing, and I believe] If everybody was to sing this song, it could save the whole world."

== Release ==
In 1997, Burke recalled: "When I did it for Jerry Wexler and Bert Burns (sic), they told me that song would never make it. I said, 'Well, I tell ya what—I'll give you a piece of it.' They said, 'That's the way we'll get the record played, so we'll take a piece of it.' In those days, they took a piece of your songs—a piece of the publishing—but in the end, you didn't have any pieces left. Even now, I'm still struggling to get the publishing, the royalties, and that'll never happen."

Jerry Wexler maintained in 2002: "I know Solomon is upset about that, and I wrote him a long letter explaining how we wrote the song together and that he has always gotten his share of the royalties. I know that because I get royalty checks for the song. The whole process of making a record is a collaborative affair and the issue of who does just what on a song sometimes gets confusing, but not on that song. We wrote it in Bert's apartment. Bert had a guitar and we wrote it together."

Burke's version, while later ranked #429 on the Rolling Stone magazine's 2004 list of The 500 Greatest Songs of All Time, and ranked #447 in Dave Marsh's book, In The Heart of Rock & Soul: The 1001 Greatest Singles Ever Made, which was released in July 1964, and was in the US Pop Charts for 8 weeks, but only reached #58.

== Wilson Pickett recording ==
Wilson Pickett recorded the most successful version and released a cover of the song on his 1966 album The Wicked Pickett. This version (which explicitly mentions Solomon Burke in the opening section) made it to No. 29 pop, and No. 19 R&B in early 1967.

=== Chart performance ===
Chart (1967)	Peak position
US Billboard Hot 100	29
US Billboard Top Selling R&B Singles	19

== Live performances ==
Burke made an appearance to sing the song during The Rolling Stones 2002-2003 tour, singing the song, which was included in the Stones' 2004 live album Live Licks.

It was also performed live by The Shadows of Knight, included on their LP The Shadows Of Knight – Live 1966.

== Other cover versions ==
Many other artists have covered the song, among them:

- "Everybody Needs Somebody to Love" was covered twice by The Rolling Stones almost immediately in January 1965, for their 1965 album The Rolling Stones No. 2. The version on the US The Rolling Stones, Now! album was an earlier version of the song and apparently issued by mistake.
- Small Faces covered the backing track of the song with reworked lyrics, and released this version as their debut single on August 6, 1965 under the name "Whatcha Gonna Do About It".
- Dusty Springfield performed the song in 1967 on her TV show The Dusty Springfield Show.
- It was performed live by The 13th Floor Elevators in the 1960s. A live version of the song is on their 1968 album Live. It is featured also as a bonus track on the 2005 reissue of their first album The Psychedelic Sounds of the 13th Floor Elevators (1966) and on the 3-disc box set The Psychedelic World of the 13th Floor Elevators (2002).
- Led Zeppelin was known to cover it live as part of a medley in "Whole Lotta Love".
- The song is performed in the 1980 film The Blues Brothers sung by John Belushi and Dan Aykroyd as The Blues Brothers. The song was also included on the soundtrack album. In 1989 it was released as a single in the UK, backed by "Think" but failed to chart. In April 1990, it was reissued backed with "Minnie the Moocher" and peaked at #12 following its media exposure by Jive Bunny and the Mastermixers.
- Jive Bunny and the Mastermixers reached #4 in the UK charts with a medley called "That Sounds Good to Me" in March 1990 which began and ended with a version of "Everybody Needs Somebody to Love". The music video and single artwork depicted the cartoon character of Jive Bunny in the Blues Brothers' signature dark sunglasses and suit. This led to renewed interest in The Blues Brothers and their version being released as a single the following month which became a hit in its own right reaching #12.
- Genesis covered it as a part of their oldies medley interpolated with "Turn It On Again" in their 1980s live shows.
- The Jerry Garcia Band performed the song live during the 1990s and a version appears on the album Shining Star.
- The song also featured predominantly in the BBC television sitcom 2point4 children, where Ben, Jenny and David performed the song at Jenny's school auditions on the Series 4 episode 26 "Frenzy" on October 3, 1994.
- Since c. 2004, the song has been used in adverts for Celebrations.
- In 2004, Westlife performed the song live on their Turnaround Tour.
- Mick Jagger performed this song at the 53rd Annual Grammy Awards on February 13, 2011, in honor of Solomon Burke.
- American jam band Neighbor covered the song at (live at The Met 3/11/23)

== Popular culture ==
- In 2018, during the finale of Series 15 of Ant & Dec's Saturday Night Takeaway, the song was used when Declan Donnelly, Stephen Mulhern and Scarlett Moffatt were handing out party tickets.
- Amazon.com selected the song as the theme for its 2019 holiday campaign.
- A cover by the Dancing Bros. appears in the dance game Just Dance 4, the cover is based on the Blues Brothers version.
- The song plays during the Christmas dinner scene in the video game Spider-Man: Miles Morales.
