= So What (Jerry Garcia and David Grisman album) =

Studio album by Jerry Garcia and David Grisman
- Released: August 1998
- Recorded: 1990–1992
- Genre: Jazz, new acoustic
- Label: Acoustic Disc

Jerry Garcia and David Grisman chronology
Shady Grove (1996)	So What (1998)	The Pizza Tapes (2000)

Jerry Garcia chronology
Breakdown (1997)	So What (1998)	Side Trips, Volume One (1998)

David Grisman chronology
Doc & Dawg (1998)	So What (1998)	Retrograss (1999)

So What is a jazz album by American musicians Jerry Garcia and David Grisman. It was released on CD by the Acoustic Disc record label in August 1998.

So What was released by Org Music as a two-disc LP on November 24, 2023, as part of Record Store Day Black Friday.

== Critical reception ==
Professional ratings
Review scores
Source	Rating
Allmusic	4/5 stars
The Music Box	4/5 stars

On AllMusic, Scott Yanow said, "Garcia is quite credible as a jazz improviser without attempting to be a virtuoso; he apparently loved the music and does not sound at all like a rock player. The versatile Grisman effectively updates his swing style, and the rhythm section is driving and supportive despite being quite light in volume.... A nice surprise that is well worth checking out. "

In The Music Box, John Metzger wrote, "Over the course of So What's 60-minute length, Garcia and Grisman strike up a musical conversation in their own perceptive and unique manner. They each smoothly make the transition between soloing and rhythmic accompaniment, giving one another plenty of room to fashion their acrobatic musical maneuvers. The result is an immaculate disc of free-flowing, mind-blowing jazz interpretations."

== Track listing ==
1. "So What" (Miles Davis) – 6:55
2. "Bag's Groove" (Milt Jackson) – 8:43
3. "Milestones" (Davis) – 7:55
4. "16/16" (David Grisman) – 6:18
5. "So What" (Davis) – 7:51
6. "Bag's Groove" (Jackson) – 8:22
7. "Milestones" (Davis) – 10:18
8. "So What" (Davis) – 7:40

== Personnel ==
=== Musicians ===
- Jerry Garcia - guitar
- David Grisman - mandolin
- Jim Kerwin - bass
- Joe Craven - percussion
- Matt Eakle - flute (tracks 2 and 4)

=== Production ===
- David Grisman – producer
- Craig Miller – executive producer
- David Dennison – recording, mixing
- Paul Stubblebine – mastering
- Alice G. Patterson – back cover photograph
- D. Brent Houseman – layout and design
- Jerry Garcia – original artwork
