= Legion of Mary: The Jerry Garcia Collection, Vol. 1 =

Live album by Legion of Mary
- Released: August 23, 2005
- Recorded: December 14, 1974–July 5, 1975
- Venue: Paramount Theatre, Portland, Oregon • Great American Music Hall, San Francisco • The Keystone, Berkeley, California • Oriental Theater, Milwaukee
- Genre: Rock, jazz-rock
- Label: Rhino

Merl Saunders and Jerry Garcia chronology
Pure Jerry: Keystone Berkeley, September 1, 1974 (2004)	Legion of Mary: The Jerry Garcia Collection, Vol. 1 (2005)	Well-Matched: The Best of Merl Saunders & Jerry Garcia (2006)

Merl Saunders chronology
Pure Jerry: Keystone Berkeley, September 1, 1974 (2004)	Legion of Mary: The Jerry Garcia Collection, Vol. 1 (2005)	Live On Tour (2006)

Jerry Garcia chronology
Pure Jerry: Merriweather Post Pavilion, September 1 & 2, 1989 (2005)	Legion of Mary: The Jerry Garcia Collection, Vol. 1 (2005)	Pure Jerry: Warner Theatre, March 18, 1978 (2005)

Professional ratings
Review scores
Source	Rating
AllMusic	3.5/5 stars
The Music Box	4/5 stars

Legion of Mary: The Jerry Garcia Collection, Vol. 1 is an album by Legion of Mary, a jazz influenced rock band led by Jerry Garcia of the Grateful Dead. It was recorded live on various dates from December 1974 to July 1975, at the Keystone in Berkeley, California, the Great American Music Hall in San Francisco, California, and the Paramount Theatre in Portland, Oregon. It was released on August 23, 2005.

Besides Garcia on guitar and vocals, Legion of Mary features Merl Saunders on keyboards, Martin Fierro on saxophone and flute, John Kahn on bass, and Ron Tutt on drums.

Another live album by Legion of Mary is Garcia Live Volume Three. Released on three CDs in October 2013, it contains recordings from the band's December 1974 tour of the Pacific Northwest.

A recording by a slightly earlier lineup of this band, not yet known as Legion of Mary, is Pure Jerry: Keystone Berkeley, September 1, 1974. Released in December 2004, it contains a complete concert on three CDs. The lineup is the same as on the Legion of Mary album, except that the drummer is Ron Tutt's predecessor in the band, Paul Humphrey.

In August 1975, Garcia disbanded Legion of Mary, and formed a new group called the Jerry Garcia Band. The first lineup of the Jerry Garcia Band also included Kahn and Tutt, along with Nicky Hopkins on piano. A live recording of that band, from November 1975, was released in 2009 as the album Let It Rock: The Jerry Garcia Collection, Vol. 2.

== Track listing ==
Disc one

1. "Tough Mama" (Bob Dylan) – 9:42
2. "That's a Touch I Like" (Jesse Winchester) – 11:54
3. "I Second That Emotion" (Al Cleveland, Smokey Robinson) – 14:02
4. "Since I Lost My Baby" (Pete Moore, Smokey Robinson) – 11:56
5. "Tore Up over You" (Hank Ballard) – 11:49
6. "The Night They Drove Old Dixie Down" (Robbie Robertson) – 8:30
7. "Talkin' 'bout You" (Ray Charles) – 11:16

Disc two

1. "I'll Take a Melody" (Allen Toussaint) – 11:27
2. "Let it Rock" (Chuck Berry) – 13:54
3. "Neighbor, Neighbor" (Alton J. Valier) – 11:56
4. "Money Honey" (Jesse Stone) – 10:04
5. "Last Train from Poor Valley" (Norman Blake) – 7:54
6. "Mystery Train" (Junior Parker, Sam Philips) – 13:02
7. "How Sweet It Is (To Be Loved by You)" (Brian Holland, Lamont Dozier, Eddie Holland) – 10:55

Bonus disc: Absolute Mary

1. "Boogie On Reggae Woman" (Stevie Wonder) – 17:40
2. "Every Word You Say" (Jesse Winchester) – 5:17
3. "L-o-M Jam" (Legion of Mary) – 10:54
4. "It's No Use" (Traditional) – 10:55
5. "Wicked Messenger" (Bob Dylan) – 14:02
6. "Sittin' Here in Limbo" (Jimmy Cliff, Guilly Bright-Plummer) – 14:35

Recording dates and venues

- December 14, 1974, Paramount Theatre, Portland, Oregon: "How Sweet It Is (To Be Loved by You)"
- February 27, 1975, Great American Music Hall, San Francisco, California: "Let It Rock", "Neighbor, Neighbor", "Money Honey", "Last Train from Poor Valley", "L-o-M Jam", "Sittin' Here in Limbo'
- March 1, 1975, The Keystone, Berkeley, California: "That's a Touch I Like", "I Second That Emotion", "The Night They Drove Old Dixie Down"
- April 19, 1975, Oriental Theater, Milwaukee: "It's No Use"
- May 15, 1975, Great American Music Hall: "I'll Take a Melody", "Boogie On Reggae Woman", "Wicked Messenger"
- May 22, 1975, The Keystone: "Since I Lost My Baby", "Tore Up over You", "Every Word You Say"
- July 4, 1975, Great American Music Hall: "Tough Mama"
- July 5, 1975, The Keystone: "Talkin' 'bout You", "Mystery Train"

== Personnel ==
=== Legion of Mary ===
- Jerry Garcia - guitar, vocals
- Merl Saunders - keyboards, organ, vocals
- Martin Fierro - saxophone, flute
- John Kahn - electric bass
- Ron Tutt - drums

=== Production ===
- Original recordings producers - Jerry Garcia, Merl Saunders
- Compilation producers - James Austin, Blair Jackson, Hale Milgrim, Peter McQuaid
- Executive producer - Christopher Sabec
- Recording - Betty Cantor-Jackson
- Tape research - David Lemieux
- Engineer, mastering - Joe Gastwirt
- Art direction - Hugh Brown, Katherine Delaney
- Design - Katherine Delaney
- Photography - Roberto Rabanne
- Cover illustration - Ken Featherston
- Liner notes - Blair Jackson
