= Mother McCree's Uptown Jug Champions (album) =

Live album by Mother McCree's Uptown Jug Champions
- Released: 1999
- Recorded: July 1964
- Genre: Folk
- Length: 49:05
- Label: Grateful Dead Records
- Producer: Michael Wanger

Jerry Garcia chronology
| Side Trips, Volume One (1998) | Mother McCree's Uptown Jug Champions (1999) | The Pizza Tapes (2000) |

Professional ratings
Review scores
| Source | Rating |
|---|---|
| Allmusic | 3/5 stars |
| The Music Box | 3/5 stars |

Mother McCree's Uptown Jug Champions is an American folk music album. It was recorded live by the band of the same name at the Top of the Tangent coffee house in Palo Alto, California in July, 1964, and released in 1999.

The band Mother McCree's Uptown Jug Champions was a precursor of the rock group the Grateful Dead, and included three future members of that band – Jerry Garcia, Bob Weir, and Ron "Pigpen" McKernan.

== The jug band tapes ==
Mother McCree's Uptown Jug Champions was a jug band. Jug band music is a type of folk music that uses traditional musical instruments such as guitar, mandolin, and banjo, combined with homemade instruments, including washtub bass, washboard, kazoo, and, eponymously, a jug, played by blowing into it as if it were a brass instrument. Jug bands were popular in the 1920s and 1930s. In the 1960s, jug band music enjoyed somewhat of a resurgence as part of the American folk music revival. Jug bands of the 1960s often played popular music from the earlier jug band era, along with more contemporary folk and blues songs, as can be heard on the Mother McCree's album.

The performances on the album were recorded by Stanford University students Pete Wanger and Wayne Ott. They played the recordings on the folk music show Live from the Top of the Tangent which was broadcast on Stanford's FM radio station KZSU. The Tangent, a folk music coffee house operated by Stanford Medical Center doctors, Stuart "Stu" Goldstein and David "Dave" Shoenstadt, on University Avenue in Palo Alto, was a venue where other performers who later had flourishing careers also played, including Janis Joplin, Peter Albin, and Jorma Kaukonen. The tapes were thought to be lost to history until Pete Wanger and his brother Michael found them in the attic of their mother's house after she died in 1997. They found enough material there for a whole album. The recordings were subsequently mastered for CD by Grateful Dead recording engineer Jeffrey Norman. Michael Wanger, a boyhood friend of Bob Weir, wrote the liner notes for the CD.

Mother McCree's Uptown Jug Champions includes several songs that were later played in concert by the Grateful Dead – "Overseas Stomp" (also known as "Lindy"), "Ain't It Crazy" (a.k.a. "The Rub"), "On the Road Again", "The Monkey and the Engineer", and "Beat It On Down the Line".

== Track listing ==
1. "Overseas Stomp" (Will Shade)
2. "Ain't It Crazy" (Sam "Lightning" Hopkins)
3. Boo break
4. "Yes She Do, No She Don't" (Peter DeRose, Jo Trent)
5. "Memphis" (Chuck Berry)
6. "Boodle Am Shake" (Jack Palmer, Spencer Williams)
7. "Big Fat Woman" (Huddie Ledbetter)
8. "Borneo" (Walter Donaldson)
9. "My Gal" (traditional)
10. "Shake That Thing" (Papa Charlie Jackson)
11. "Beat It On Down the Line" (Jesse Fuller)
12. "Cocaine Habit Blues" (traditional)
13. "Beedle Um Bum" (Booker T. Bradshaw)
14. "On the Road Again" (traditional)
15. "The Monkey and the Engineer" (Jesse Fuller)
16. "In the Jailhouse Now" (Jimmie Rodgers)
17. "Crazy Words, Crazy Tune" (Jack Yellen, Milton Ager)
18. Band interview

== Personnel ==
=== Musicians ===
- Jerry Garcia – guitar, kazoo, banjo, vocals
- Ron "Pigpen" McKernan – harmonica, vocals
- Bob Weir – guitar, washtub bass, foot crusher, jug, kazoo, vocals
- Dave Parker – washboard, kazoo, tin cup, vocals
- Tom Stone – banjo, mandolin, guitar, vocals
- Mike Garbett – washtub bass, guitar, kazoo

=== Production ===
- Produced by Michael Wanger
- Recorded live at the Tangent by Pete Wanger and Wayne Ott
- CD mastered by Jeffrey Norman, Club Front
- Cover art by Timothy Truman
- Package design by Gecko Graphics
- Jerry Garcia photo by Hank Harrison/Arkives
- Pigpen photo by Joe Novakovich/Arkives
- Bob Weir photo courtesy Weir family archives
- Special thanks to John Cutler and Peter McQuaid
