= After Midnight: Kean College, 2/28/80 =

Live album by Jerry Garcia Band
- Released: September 28, 2004
- Recorded: February 28, 1980, Union Township, NJ, Bonus disc: February 29, 1980, Hempstead, NY, March 1, 1980, Passaic, NJ
- Genre: Rock
- Label: Rhino

Jerry Garcia Band chronology
Pure Jerry: Theatre 1839, San Francisco, July 29 & 30, 1977 (2004)	After Midnight: Kean College, 2/28/80 (2004)	Pure Jerry: Lunt-Fontanne, New York City, October 31, 1987 (2004)

Jerry Garcia chronology
Pure Jerry: Theatre 1839, San Francisco, July 29 & 30, 1977 (2004)	After Midnight: Kean College, 2/28/80 (2004)	Pure Jerry: Lunt-Fontanne, New York City, October 31, 1987 (2004)

Alternative cover
- Way After Midnight bonus disc

Professional ratings
Review scores
Source	Rating
Allmusic	4/5 stars
The Music Box	4.5/5 stars
Allmusic	Way After Midnight

After Midnight: Kean College, 2/28/80 is a live album by the Jerry Garcia Band. It was recorded in Union Township, Union County, New Jersey, at Kean College on February 28, 1980, and released in 2004.

Some copies of After Midnight included a bonus disc, Way After Midnight, with tracks recorded on February 29 at Calderone Concert Hall in Hempstead, New York and on March 1 at the Capitol Theatre in Passaic, New Jersey. The recording is widely considered to be one of the best from the early 1980s that the Jerry Garcia Band played.

== Track listing ==
Disc One (Early Show)
No.	Title	Writer(s)	Length
1.	"Sugaree"	Robert Hunter, Jerry Garcia	14:50
2.	"Catfish John"	Bob McDill, Allen Reynolds	11:21
3.	"That's What Love Will Make You Do"	James Banks, Eddie Marion, Henderson Thigpen	10:04
4.	"Simple Twist of Fate"	Bob Dylan	17:27

Disc Two (Early Show)
No.	Title	Writer(s)	Length
1.	"How Sweet It Is"	Holland–Dozier–Holland	10:23
2.	"After Midnight"	J. J. Cale	13:13
3.	"Eleanor Rigby Jam"	Lennon–McCartney	3:20
4.	"After Midnight"	Cale	6:33

Disc Three (Late Show)
No.	Title	Writer(s)	Length
1.	"I'll Take a Melody"	Allen Toussaint	14:01
2.	"Tore up over You""	Hank Ballard	10:25
3.	"Knockin' on Heaven's Door"	Dylan	13:57
4.	"The Harder They Come"	Jimmy Cliff	12:42
5.	"Tiger Rose" (featuring Robert Hunter on vocals)	Hunter	3:42
6.	"Promontory Rider" (featuring Robert Hunter on vocals)	Hunter	4:31
7.	"Mission in the Rain"	Hunter, Garcia	11:28
8.	"Midnight Moonlight"	Peter Rowan	7:06

Bonus Disc: Way After Midnight
No.	Title	Writer(s)	Recording date	Length
1.	"Dear Prudence"	Lennon–McCartney	February 29, 1980	10:30
2.	"When I Paint My Masterpiece"	Dylan	February 29, 1980	11:35
3.	"Russian Lullaby"	Irving Berlin	February 29, 1980	15:36
4.	"That's All Right, Mama"	Arthur Crudup	March 1, 1980	7:42
5.	"Deal"	Hunter, Garcia	February 29, 1980	9:20

== Charts ==
- #118 on the Billboard 200

CD Cover drawing credit: Dayna Winston

== Credits ==
=== Jerry Garcia Band ===
- Jerry Garcia — guitar, vocals
- John Kahn — bass
- Ozzie Ahlers — keyboards
- Johnny d'Fonseca Jr — drums

=== Additional personnel ===
- Robert Hunter — guitar, harmonica, vocals

=== Production ===
- Original producer — Jerry Garcia
- Release producer — Christopher Sabec, Peter McQuaid, Hale Milgrim
- A&R supervision — James Austin, Jimmy Edwards
- Tape research — David Lemieux
- Mixing — Tom Flye
- Second engineer — Robert Gatley
- Mastering — Joe Gastwirt
- Editorial supervision — Steven Chean
- CD booklet notes — Robert Hunter
- Art direction, design — Hugh Brown, Katherine Delaney
- Live photos — Jay Blakesberg
- Album coordination — Jeff Adams
