= Don't Let Go (Jerry Garcia Band album) =

Live album by Jerry Garcia Band
- Released: January 23, 2001
- Recorded: May 21, 1976
- Genre: Rock
- Label: Grateful Dead Records

Jerry Garcia Band chronology
How Sweet It Is (1997)	Don't Let Go (2001)	Shining Star (2001)

Jerry Garcia chronology
The Pizza Tapes (2000)	Don't Let Go (2001)	Shining Star (2001)

Don't Let Go is the third live album, and fourth album overall, by the Jerry Garcia Band. It includes the complete May 21, 1976 performance at the Orpheum Theatre in San Francisco, with a bonus track recorded on September 11, 1976, at the Keystone in Berkeley. It was released on January 23, 2001.

From January 1976 to August 1977, the lineup of the Jerry Garcia Band was the one featured on this recording – Jerry Garcia on guitar and vocals, Keith Godchaux on keyboards, Donna Jean Godchaux on vocals, John Kahn on bass, and Ron Tutt on drums. Two other albums recorded by this lineup are Pure Jerry: Theatre 1839, San Francisco, July 29 & 30, 1977 and Garcia Live Volume Seven.

Jerry Garcia plays a Travis Bean guitar on this recording.

== Critical reception ==
Professional ratings
Review scores
Source	Rating
Allmusic	4/5 stars
The Music Box	4/5 stars

On Allmusic, Lindsay Planer said, "This band is about infectious rhythms and soul. Garcia plays with an energy and freedom of spirit which he rarely achieved during his final two decades with the Grateful Dead. This was likely due, at least in part, to the encyclopedic catalog of material... The band uses the structure of each song as a platform for their unique brand of instinctual aural acrobatics. The interplay amongst the instrumental quartet is best described as inspired telepathy.... Don't Let Go is highly recommended for the curious enthusiast as well as the insatiable Deadhead."

In The Music Box, John Metzger wrote, "Unfortunately, Don't Let Go is not the definitive, perfect set from JGB, though Deadheads undoubtedly will find the album – which was compiled from a Bay Area concert held on May 21, 1976 – to be a must-have collection. Likewise, the uninitiated who might be open to this sort of thing certainly will find the spark of brilliance that shines through many of the tracks and hides just beneath the surface on several others. Those most passive of Deadheads and the just faintly curious, however, might want to wait for something a little less flawed."

== Track listing ==
Disc one

1. "Sugaree" (Robert Hunter, Jerry Garcia) – 9:55
2. "They Love Each Other" (Hunter, Garcia) – 8:31
3. "That's What Love Will Make You Do" (James Banks, Eddy Marion, Henderson Thigpen) – 9:56
4. "Knockin' on Heaven's Door" (Bob Dylan) – 11:07
5. "Sitting in Limbo" (Plummer Bright, James Chambers) – 10:29
6. "Mission in the Rain" (Hunter, Garcia) – 7:43
7. "Don't Let Go" (Jesse Stone) – 16:03

Disc two

1. "After Midnight" (J. J. Cale) – 11:00
2. "Strange Man" (Dorothy Love Coates) – 7:12
3. "Tore Up over You" (Hank Ballard) – 9:28
4. "I'll Take a Melody" (Allen Toussaint) – 15:10
5. "The Way You Do the Things You Do" (Smokey Robinson, Robert "Bobby" Rogers) – 7:11
6. "My Sisters and Brothers" (Charles Johnson) – 6:41
7. "Lonesome and a Long Way from Home" (Bonnie Bramlett, Leon Russell) – 14:27

Bonus track:

8. "Mighty High" (David Crawford, Richard Downing) – 6:26

== Personnel ==
Jerry Garcia Band

- Jerry Garcia – guitar, vocals
- Donna Godchaux – vocals
- Keith Godchaux – keyboards, vocals
- John Kahn – bass
- Ron Tutt – drums, vocals

Production

- Album coordinator: Cassidy Law
- Executive producer: Deborah Koons Garcia
- Recording: Betty Cantor-Jackson
- Mastering: Jeffrey Norman
- Tape archivist: David Lemieux
- Photography: Ed Perlstein
