= Side Trips, Volume One =

Live album by Howard Wales and Jerry Garcia
- Released: October 1998
- Recorded: 1970
- Genre: Jazz fusion
- Length: 65:22
- Label: Grateful Dead Records
- Producer: Howard Wales; John Cutler

Howard Wales and Jerry Garcia chronology
Hooteroll? (1971)	Side Trips, Volume One (1998)

Jerry Garcia chronology
So What (1998)	Side Trips, Volume One (1998)	Mother McCree's Uptown Jug Champions (1999)

Side Trips, Volume One is a jazz fusion album by Howard Wales and Jerry Garcia. It was recorded live at the Matrix in San Francisco in 1970, and released on CD in October 1998. It was released as a two-disc LP in a limited edition of 2,500 copies for Record Store Day in November 2017.

== Monday night jam sessions at the Matrix ==
In a 1991 interview, Garcia said, "So they used to have this Monday night jam session, but Howard gradually sort of took it over. Howard's this amazing organ player — difficult person, but wonderful musician. And for some reason he liked our playing, John [Kahn] and mine. We didn't know each other, John and I. In fact we played with Howard for almost a year before we even actually started talking to each other. Really. We would just show up, plug in, and play. About half the set I'd be whispering to John, I'd be saying, 'Hey, man, what key are we in?' Howard didn't have tunings or anything, he just played. Sometimes he would do these things that were so outside that you just couldn't — unless you knew where it was going, you had no idea where to start. Sometimes they'd turn out to be just these things like four-bar blues turnarounds, relatively simple musical things, but they were so extended the way he'd play them — 'God, what is this?'"

== Critical reception ==
Professional ratings
Review scores
Source	Rating
Allmusic	3/5 stars

On AllMusic, William Ruhlmann wrote, "Wales and Garcia are joined by bassist John Kahn and drummer Bill Vitt (both of whom would work extensively in Garcia's non-Dead aggregations) for 65 minutes of free-form playing. Occasionally, especially when Garcia is playing, it sounds like the Dead in the middle of one of its extended improvisations, except, of course, that the music never returns to a familiar tune."

== Track listing ==
All compositions by Howard Wales.

1. "Free Flight" – 18:14
2. "Space Funk" – 13:12
3. "All for Life" – 24:33
4. "Venutian Blues" – 9:15

== Personnel ==
Musicians

- Howard Wales – Hammond B3 organ, Fender Rhodes piano
- Jerry Garcia – guitar
- John Kahn – bass
- Bill Vitt – drums

Production

- Produced by Howard Wales and John Cutler
- CD mastering by Jeffrey Norman
- Design by Gecko Graphics
- Photo by Ron Rakow
- Logo photo by Mary Ann Mayer
- Thanks to Deborah Garcia, Herbie Herbert, Steve Parish
