= Barr v. American Ass'n of Political Consultants =

Barr v. American Ass'n of Political Consultants, Inc.
- Supreme Court of the United States

Argued May 6, 2020 Decided July 6, 2020
- Full case name: William P. Barr, Attorney General, et al., v. American Association of Political Consultants, Inc., et al.
- Docket no.: 19-631
- Citations: 591 U.S. ___ (more) 140 S. Ct. 2335; 207 L. Ed. 2d 784

Case history
- Prior: Summary judgment granted, Am. Ass'n of Political Consultants v. Sessions, 323 F. Supp. 3d 737 (E.D.N.C. 2018); Vacated and remanded, Am. Ass'n of Political Consultants, Inc. v. FCC, 923 F.3d 159 (4th Cir. 2019); Cert. granted, 140 S. Ct. 812 (2020)

Holding
- The 2015 government-debt exception of the Telephone Consumer Protection Act of 1991 violates the First Amendment.

Court membership
- Chief Justice John Roberts Associate Justices Clarence Thomas · Ruth Bader Ginsburg; Stephen Breyer · Samuel Alito; Sonia Sotomayor · Elena Kagan; Neil Gorsuch · Brett Kavanaugh

Case opinions
- Plurality: Kavanaugh, joined by Roberts, Alito; Thomas (Parts I and II)
- Concurrence: Sotomayor (in judgment)
- Concur/dissent: Breyer (concurring in the judgment with respect to severability and dissenting in part), joined by Ginsburg, Kagan
- Concur/dissent: Gorsuch (concurring in the judgment in part and dissenting in part), joined by Thomas (Part II)

Laws applied
- U.S. Const. Amend. I; Telephone Consumer Protection Act of 1991

Barr v. American Ass'n of Political Consultants, Inc., 591 U.S. ___ (2020), was a United States Supreme Court case involving the use of robocalls made to cell phones, a practice that had been banned by the Telephone Consumer Protection Act of 1991 (TCPA), but which exemptions had been made by a 2015 amendment for government debt collection. The case was brought by the American Association of Political Consultants, an industry trade group, and others that desired to use robocalls to make political ads, challenging the exemption unconstitutionally favored debt collection speech over political speech. The Supreme Court, in a complex plurality decision, ruled on July 6, 2020, that the 2015 amendment to the TCPA did unconstitutionally favor debt collection speech over political speech and violated the First Amendment.

== Background ==
The Telephone Consumer Protection Act of 1991 (TCPA) was enacted to help consumers deal with growing amounts of unsolicited advertising and messaging they were receiving by telephone systems. One provision was to prohibit the use of any automated call system to contact consumers on a manner which they may be charged for the call, such as on cell phones, without the consumer's prior consent, as outlined at 47 U.S.C. § 227(b)(1)(A)(iii). This effectively banned robocalls from making calls to cell phones. The Federal Communications Commission (FCC) was authorized to oversee and fine those that misuse this provision, as well as giving states powers to seek civil remedies in court.

In 2015, Congress passed the Bipartisan Budget Bill as part of its normal appropriations process. It included a brief amendment to the TCPA that made an exemption to § 227(b)(1)(A)(iii) to allow for automated calls related to debts owned to the federal government.

Political advocacy groups, such as those that run polls, have generally been adverse to robocall restrictions as it limits their ability to get their message out and to measure how well a candidate is performing in informal surveys, which they feel is an important part of the election process. After the 2015 Bipartisan Budget Bill was passed, a group of advocacy groups filed suit in the United States District Court for the Eastern District of North Carolina in May 2016, challenging that that new amendment was unconstitutional as it created a content-based form of discrimination on speech in violation of the First Amendment of the United States Constitution. The groups' tactic was aimed at trying to invalidate § 227(b)(1)(A)(iii) as a whole, and not just the new amendment, by showing that the limitations it placed as a whole were content-based distriction. The District Court granted summary judgement for the government asserting that while there was speech discrimination, it met the basis of strict scrutiny serving a compelling government interest, in this case, collecting on debt it was owed.

The advocacy groups appealed to the United States Court of Appeals for the Fourth Circuit. There, the Fourth Circuit vacated the District Court's ruling and remanded the case for further review. The Fourth agreed in the District Court's concept that there was a rationale to apply the strict scrutiny test for the government-debt speech exemption, but ruled that the District Court's application of the test was incorrect, given the nature of the TCPA was meant to be prohibitive. The Fourth Circuit also found that the amendment was severable from the original TCPA law, and thus invalidated the new amendment.

== Supreme Court ==
The government asked the Supreme Court to hear the case, and the Supreme Court granted the petition in January 2020. Oral arguments were heard on May 6, 2020, part of the block of cases that were held via teleconference due to the COVID-19 pandemic. Oral arguments focused on how the strict scrutiny tests should apply to the 2015 amendment, and whether that amendment was severable from the entire TCPA, questions that had been brought up from the Fourth Circuit's decision.

The Supreme Court issued its ruling on July 6, 2020. The Court affirmed the Fourth Circuit's decision in that the 2015 amendment, in that its exception for the government-debt clause violated the First Amendment, and because the amendment was severable from the rest of the TCPA, invalidated only that portion of the law.

=== First Amendment challenge ===
The 6–3 decision was complex. Six justices agreed that the government-debt amendment, or the entire TCPA, violated the First Amendment.

Justice Brett Kavanaugh wrote the plurality decision, joined by Chief Justice John Roberts and Justices Clarence Thomas and Samuel Alito. Kavanaugh agreed with the Fourth Circuit's reasoning that the 2015 amendment was a content-based restriction that should be judged by strict scrutiny, as per Reed v. Town of Gilbert, and that it failed to pass the strict scrutiny test.

Justice Sonia Sotomayor wrote in concurrence. She too would invalidate the government-debt amendment, but stated that the amendment failed on intermediate scrutiny, rather than strict scrutiny.

Justice Neil Gorsuch would have gone further than the plurality and argued that the TCPA's entire robocall restriction is a content-based restriction that fails strict scrutiny and thus could not be constitutionally enforced.

Justice Stephen Breyer, joined by Justices Ruth Bader Ginsburg and Elena Kagan, dissented, stating that strict scrutiny was not the correct standard to use. Justice Breyer disagreed with language in Reed v. Gilbert. He suggested that content discrimination should not always trigger strict scrutiny. Instead, the Court should consider "First Amendment values," applying strict scrutiny in cases involving "political speech, public forums, and the expression of all viewpoints on any given issue," but use a less strict standard when a case, as here, "primarily involves commercial regulation—namely, debt collection." In Breyer's view, courts should not "use the First Amendment in a way that would threaten the workings of ordinary regulatory programs posing little threat to the free marketplace of ideas."

=== Severability ===
With a majority of justices agreed that the debt-collection amendment was unconstitutional, the question arose whether the amendment could be severed from the rest of the TCPA, or whether the whole law was invalid. The Court ruled 7–2 that the amendment was severable.

Seven justices followed Kavanaugh's severability analysis, and would preserve most of the TCPA. Kavanaugh's opinion noted that the TCPA has an express severability clause. Even without this clause, the Court should apply the "presumption of severability" and allow as much of the statute to stand as possible. As Kavanaugh wrote, "constitutional litigation is not a game of gotcha against Congress, where litigants can ride a discrete constitutional flaw in a statute to take down the whole, otherwise constitutional statute."

Justices Gorsuch dissented from this part of the ruling, joined by Justice Thomas. These justices would issue an injunction preventing enforcement of the TCPA, allowing political robocalls to go out to cellphones.

== Toilet flush ==
The case was also brought to international media attention after a toilet was heard being flushed during oral arguments. The FCC chairman Ajit Pai stated on Twitter "...the FCC does not construe the flushing of a toilet immediately after counsel said "what the FCC has said" to reflect a substantive judgment of the Supreme Court, or of any Justice thereof, regarding an agency determination." Though it is not known for certain where the toilet flush came from, Slate alleged it came from Justice Breyer's microphone due to a history of technical difficulties with Zoom from him.
