= Shining Star (Jerry Garcia Band album) =

Live album by Jerry Garcia Band
- Released: March 20, 2001
- Recorded: 1989–1993
- Genre: Rock
- Label: Grateful Dead Records
- Producer: David Lemieux

Jerry Garcia Band chronology
Don't Let Go (2001)	Shining Star (2001)	Pure Jerry: Theatre 1839, San Francisco, July 29 & 30, 1977 (2004)

Jerry Garcia chronology
Don't Let Go (2001)	Shining Star (2001)	Grateful Dawg (2001)

Professional ratings
Review scores
Source	Rating
Allmusic	4/5 stars
The Music Box	5/5 stars

Shining Star is the fourth live album, and fifth album overall, by the Jerry Garcia Band. A double CD, it was recorded at various concerts from 1989 to 1993. It was released on March 21, 2001.

== Critical reception ==
On Allmusic, Lindsay Planer wrote, "While the Grateful Dead will always be considered Jerry Garcia's primary outlet, the Jerry Garcia Band often proved the most musically satisfying of the two. Shining Star is a double-disc anthology featuring Garcia's other band, and is comprised entirely of cover tunes derived from concert recordings made between 1989 and 1993. The late '80s and early '90s were sporadic in terms of performance consistency for the Grateful Dead; however, 'the Jerry band' — as Deadheads refer to this aggregate — proved to be vibrant, funky, and alarmingly agile."

In The Music Box, John Metzger said, "Though the music contained on Shining Star — the latest release by the Jerry Garcia Band and the second two-disc set from the group in two months — was recorded between 1989 and 1993, it is presented in such a way as to create a 'new' concert. The seamlessness of the package is remarkable, and each track is first-rate, top-notch Garcia.... Shining Star joins 1997's How Sweet It Is and the band's 1991 self-titled double disc as essential recordings for anyone interested in Garcia's longstanding side project. What's more — each of these packages is unique, without a single song repeated.... So, which one of the three packages is the best? Undoubtedly it's Shining Star."

== Track listing ==
Disc One

1. "Shining Star" (Leo Graham, Paul Richmond)
2. "He Ain't Give You None" (Van Morrison)
3. "I Second That Emotion" (Al Cleveland, Smokey Robinson)
4. "Money Honey" (Jesse Stone)
5. "Strugglin' Man" (Jimmy Cliff)
6. "Russian Lullaby" (Irving Berlin)
7. "Everybody Needs Somebody to Love" (Bert Berns, Solomon Burke, Jerry Wexler)

Disc Two

1. "Let's Spend the Night Together" (Mick Jagger, Keith Richards)
2. "Mississippi Moon" (Peter Rowan)
3. "Let it Rock" (Chuck Berry)
4. "When the Hunter Gets Captured by the Game" (Robinson)
5. "Ain't No Bread in the Breadbox" (Norton Buffalo)
6. "Positively 4th Street" (Bob Dylan)
7. "The Maker" (Daniel Lanois)
8. "Midnight Moonlight" (Rowan)

"Midnight Moonlight" was later released as part of a full concert on (Pure Jerry: Merriweather Post Pavilion, September 1 & 2, 1989)

== Personnel ==
Jerry Garcia Band

- Jerry Garcia – guitar, vocals
- Gloria Jones – background vocals
- John Kahn – electric bass
- David Kemper – drums
- Jackie LaBranch – background vocals
- Melvin Seals – keyboards, organ

Production

- Soundboard – John Cutler
- Executive producer – Deborah Koons Garcia
- Compilation producer – David Lemieux
- Mastering – Jeffrey Norman
- Painting, typography – Neil Osborn
- Photography – Susana Millman, Robert Minkin
