= Howard Wales =

American keyboardist (1943–2020)

- Born: February 8, 1943; Milwaukee, Wisconsin, U.S.
- Died: December 7, 2020 (aged 77) Redding, California, U.S.
- Genres: Rock, jazz
- Instrument: Keyboards
- Years active: 1960s–2020
- Website: howardwales.bandcamp.com

Howard Wales (February 8, 1943 – December 7, 2020) was an American keyboardist who worked in a wide variety of styles. He was a collaborator with Jerry Garcia in the early 1970s.

Wales was a session player for many musical acts, including Ronnie Hawkins, Freddie King, James Brown, and the Four Tops. Though he was adept at accompanying rock and R&B artists, he also played free-form jazz. Later in his career he released several solo albums in this style.

For several months in 1970, Wales led Monday night jazz-rock jam sessions at the Matrix, a club in San Francisco. Jerry Garcia usually played guitar at these free-form performances. The two were often joined by John Kahn on bass and Bill Vitt on drums. A studio album called Hooteroll?, with these musicians and others, and featuring music composed mostly by Wales, was released in 1971. A live album recorded at the Matrix jam sessions, Side Trips, Volume One, was released in 1998.

Wales contributed to the 1970 Grateful Dead album American Beauty. He played organ on the songs "Truckin' " and "Candyman", and piano on "Brokedown Palace".

Wales had a cerebral hemorrhage in November 2020 and died on December 7, 2020, at the age of 77.

== Discography ==
Howard Wales

- Rendezvous with the Sun (1976)
- The Monk in the Mansion (1992)
- Complex Simplex (2001)
- Between Two Worlds (2006)
- Life Is a Trip (2009)
- Faces (2012)
- Overview (2014)
- Undisclosed Location (2018)

Howard Wales and Jerry Garcia

- Hooteroll? (1971)
- Side Trips, Volume One (1998)

With other artists

- A.B. Skhy – A.B. Skhy (1969)
- Music of El Topo – Shades of Joy (1970)
- American Beauty – Grateful Dead (1970)
- Baby Batter – Harvey Mandel (1971)
- Electronic Progress – Harvey Mandel (1971)
- The Runner – Jeff Jolly Band (1996)
- Planetary Warrior – Harvey Mandel (1997)
- Changer L'Horizon – Rod and the Shotgun Blues (1998)
- Berkeley Soul – Sy Klopps (2000)
- Raw Material – Jeff Jolly (2001)
- Mosaique – Rocío Guitard (2002)
- Harvey Mandel and the Snake Crew – Harvey Mandel (2006)
- The Wax Still Drips – Stackabones (2011)
