= Garcia Live Volume Three =

Live album by Legion of Mary
- Released: October 15, 2013
- Recorded: December 14 – 15, 1974
- Genres: Rock, jazz-rock
- Length: 180:08
- Label: ATO
- Producers: Marc Allan, Joe Gastwirt

Merl Saunders and Jerry Garcia chronology
Keystone Companions: The Complete 1973 Fantasy Recordings (2012)	Garcia Live Volume Three (2013)	Garcia Live Volume Six (2016)

Jerry Garcia chronology
Live at the Boarding House: The Complete Shows (2013)	Garcia Live Volume Three (2013)	Glendale Train (2013)

Garcia Live Volume Three is a three-CD album by Legion of Mary, a band led by Jerry Garcia and Merl Saunders. It was recorded live on December 14 and 15, 1974, at the Paramount Theatre in Portland, Oregon and the EMU Ballroom in Eugene, Oregon. It was released by ATO Records on October 15, 2013.

In addition to Garcia on guitar and vocals and Saunders on keyboards and vocals, the lineup of Legion of Mary included Martin Fierro on saxophone and flute, John Kahn on bass, and Ron Tutt on drums. The band existed from December 1974 to July 1975. Garcia Live Volume Three was recorded on their first tour. They have one other live album, Legion of Mary: The Jerry Garcia Collection, Vol. 1, which was released in 2005.

Wolf, one of Garcia's guitars, is depicted on the album cover.

== Critical reception ==
Professional ratings
Review scores
Source	Rating
AllMusic	4/5 stars

On AllMusic, Fred Thomas said, "The third installment of the Garcia Live series, an ongoing concert-recording archive for die-hard Grateful Dead and Jerry Garcia Band fans, finds over two and a half hours of previously unreleased material from a two-night stand by one of Garcia's more obscure incarnations, Legion of Mary.... With the oceanic amounts of live recordings from Garcia and the Dead, even the biggest Deadheads can get bogged down by the repetitive elements of their complete catalog of live shows. Legion of Mary represents some truly reaching and challenging sounds even for the ever-searching Garcia. It's an anomaly and a somewhat lost page in the Garcia history book, certainly one of the more interesting releases of its type, and a must-hear addition to anyone even remotely interested in the countless hours of Dick's Picks and Live/Dead material.

== Track listing ==
Disc 1

December 14, 1974, Paramount Theatre, Portland, Oregon:

1. "Boogie On Reggae Woman" (Stevie Wonder) – 18:04
2. "The Night They Drove Old Dixie Down" (Robbie Robertson) – 7:56
3. "Freedom Jazz Dance" (Eddie Harris) – 13:40
4. "Mystery Train" (Junior Parker, Sam Phillips) – 12:30
5. "How Sweet It Is (To Be Loved by You)" (Brian Holland, Lamont Dozier, Eddie Holland) – 11:06

Disc 2

December 15, 1974, EMU Ballroom, Eugene, Oregon, first set:

1. "You Can Leave Your Hat On" (Randy Newman) – 16:27
2. "Neighbor, Neighbor" (Alton J. Valier) – 12:30
3. "The Night They Drove Old Dixie Down" (Robertson) – 8:25

Disc 3

December 15, 1974, EMU Ballroom, Eugene, Oregon, second set:

1. "It Ain't No Use" (Jerry Williams Jr., Gary U.S. Bonds, Don Hollinger) – 13:26
2. "Valdez in the Country" (Donny Hathaway) – 13:26
3. "I Second That Emotion" (Al Cleveland, Smokey Robinson) – 14:53
4. "Wondering Why" (Merl Saunders, Pam Carrier) – 24:53
5. "Roadrunner" (Holland, Dozier, Holland) – 12:48

== Personnel ==
Legion of Mary

- Jerry Garcia – guitar, vocals
- Merl Saunders – keyboards, vocals
- Martin Fierro – saxophone, flute, percussion
- John Kahn – bass
- Ron Tutt – drums

Production

- Produced for release by Marc Allan, Joe Gastwirt
- Original recordings produced by Jerry Garcia
- Executive producer: Coran Capshaw
- Recording: Betty Cantor-Jackson
- Mastering: Joe Gastwirt
- Project coordinator: Kevin Monty
- Research associates: Evan Cooper, Hank Bateman
- Curators: Joe Gastwirt, Marc Allen
- Art direction, design, illustration: Ryan Corey
- Photography: Roberto Rabanne, John Conroy
- Liner notes: Darryl Norsen
