= Severability =

Ability of certain terms in a contract to be voided without voiding the remainder

In law, severability (sometimes known as salvatorius, from Latin) refers to a provision in a contract or piece of legislation which states that if some of the terms are held to be illegal or otherwise unenforceable, the remainder should still apply. Sometimes, severability clauses will state that some provisions to the contract are so essential to the contract's purpose that if they are illegal or unenforceable, the contract as a whole will be voided. However, in many legal jurisdictions, a severability clause will not be applied if it changes the fundamental nature of the contract, and that instead the contract will be void; thus, often this is not explicitly stated in the severability clause.

== Severable contract ==
In contract law, a severable contract (or "divisible contract") is a contract that is composed of several separate contracts concluded between the same parties, such that failing (breaching) one part of such a 'severable' contract does not breach the whole contract. Therefore, the other party must still honor the other subparts and cannot cancel the whole agreement. A severable contract generally must contain a "severability clause" that allows certain clauses and aspects of the contract to be "severed" without affecting the validity of the rest of the contract.

For example, if Mr. X purchases a computer, a scanner, a printer and a desk from a retailer, and the retailer cannot deliver the printer, the other parts of the contract (the computer, the scanner and the desk) are still valid and must be honored.

The above example, however, is incomplete. If Mr. X purchases a computer, scanner, printer and desk as part of a package, with the explicit agreement that all parts must be delivered together, the failure to deliver the printer may be material breach of the entire contract.

In addition, if a contract is made explicitly for a set - such as a complete set of books, furniture or clothes - the failure to deliver the entire set is almost certainly a breach of the entire contract.

== Sample clause ==
If a provision of this Agreement is or becomes illegal, invalid or unenforceable in any jurisdiction, that shall not affect:

1. the validity or enforceability in that jurisdiction of any other provision of this Agreement; or
2. the validity or enforceability in other jurisdictions of that or any other provision of this Agreement.

== Within legislation ==
Severability clauses are also commonly found in legislation under constitutional law, where they state that if some provisions of the law, or certain applications of those provisions, are found to be unconstitutional, the remaining provisions, or the remaining applications of those provisions, will, nonetheless, continue in force as law.

A broad example would be one like this:

If any one or more section, subsection, sentence, clause, phrase, word, provision or application of this Ordinance shall for any person or circumstance be held to be illegal, invalid, unenforceable, and/or unconstitutional, such decision shall not affect the validity of any other section, subsection, sentence, clause, phrase, word, provision or application of this Ordinance which is operable without the offending section, subsection, sentence, clause, phrase, word, provision or application shall remain effective notwithstanding such illegal, invalid, unenforceable, and/or unconstitutional section, subsection, sentence, clause, phrase, word, provision or application, and every section, subsection, sentence, clause, phrase, word, provision or application of this Ordinance are declared severable. The legislature hereby declares that it would have passed each part, and each provision, section, subsection, sentence, clause, phrase or word thereof, irrespective of the fact that any one or more section, subsection, sentence, clause, phrase, word, provision or application be declared illegal, invalid, unenforceable, and/or unconstitutional.

== Inseverability clauses ==
Many laws have clauses specifying clearly the exact opposite, in which only all parts of the law taken together can be enforced: This act is to be construed as a whole, and all parts of it are to be read and construed together. If any part of this act shall be adjudged by any court of competent jurisdiction to be invalid, the remainder of this act shall be invalidated. Nothing herein shall be construed to affect the parties' right to appeal the matter. (example New Hampshire statute)

A more extreme variant is a clause specifying all parties should undo all the gains they earned due to that law/contract if any provision is adjudged to be invalid.

== Severability doctrine ==
In court systems within constitutional law countries, judges may employ a severability doctrine when they deem one or more clauses of a passed statute as unconstitutional. This doctrine is used to evaluate the rest of the legislative statute, if it lacks severability clauses, to determine if the unconstitutional clauses can be severed from the rest of statute without affecting the intent or execution of the statute, thus keeping as much of the passed statute as possible. The severability doctrine is frequently used by the Supreme Court of the United States. Supreme Court Justice Brett Kavanaugh wrote in his lead opinion in Barr v. American Assn. of Political Consultants, Inc., "Constitutional litigation is not a game of gotcha against Congress, where litigants can ride a discrete constitutional flaw in a statute to take down the whole, otherwise constitutional statute...".

== See also ==
- Blue pencil doctrine

== Bibliography ==
- Legal Definition of Severable Contract – Pascasarjana Magister Pendidikan
