= Telephone Consumer Protection Act of 1991 =

U.S. federal law

- Long title: A bill to amend the Communications Act of 1934 to prohibit certain practices involving the use of telephone equipment for advertising and solicitation purposes.
- Enacted by: the 102nd United States Congress

Citations
- Public law: Pub. L. 102–243

Codification
- Acts amended: Communications Act of 1934
- U.S.C. sections created: 47 U.S.C. § 227
- U.S.C. sections amended: 47 U.S.C. § 201

Legislative history
- Introduced in the Senate as S. 1462 by Ernest Hollings (D-SC) on July 11, 1991; Passed the Senate on November 7, 1991 (Voice vote); Passed the House as the Telephone Consumer Protection Act of 1991 on November 26, 1991 (Voice vote) with amendment; Senate agreed to House amendment on November 27, 1991 (Voice vote); Signed into law by President George H. W. Bush on December 20, 1991

United States Supreme Court cases
- Mims v. Arrow Financial Services, LLC, 565 U.S. 368 (2012); Campbell-Ewald Co. v. Gomez, No. 14-857, 577 U.S. ___ (2016); Barr v. American Assn. of Political Consultants, Inc., No. 19-631, 591 U.S. ___ (2020); Facebook, Inc. v. Duguid, No. 19-511, 592 U.S. ___ (2021)

The Telephone Consumer Protection Act of 1991 (TCPA) was passed by the United States Congress in 1991 and signed into law by President George H. W. Bush as Public Law 102-243. It amended the Communications Act of 1934. The TCPA is codified as 47 U.S.C. § 227. The TCPA restricts telephone solicitations (i.e., telemarketing) and the use of automated telephone equipment. The TCPA limits companies or debt collectors from calling clients or prospective customers using automatic dialing systems, artificial or prerecorded voice messages, SMS text messages, and fax machines. It also specifies several technical requirements for fax machines, autodialers, and voice messaging systems—principally with provisions requiring identification and contact information of the entity using the device to be contained in the message.

== General provisions ==
Unless the recipient has given prior express consent, the TCPA and Federal Communications Commission (FCC) rules under the TCPA generally:

- Prohibits solicitors from calling residences before 8 a.m. or after 9 pm, local time.
- Requires solicitors maintain a company-specific "do-not-call" (DNC) list of consumers who asked not to be called; the DNC request must be honored for 5 years.
- Requires solicitors honor the National Do Not Call Registry.
- Requires solicitors provide their name, the name of the person or entity on whose behalf the call is being made, and a telephone number or address at which that person or entity may be contacted.
- Prohibits solicitations to residences that use an artificial voice or a recording.
- Prohibits any call made using automated telephone equipment or an artificial or prerecorded voice to an emergency line (e.g., "911"), a hospital emergency number, a physician's office, a hospital/health care facility/ patient care facility, a cellular telephone, or any service for which the recipient is charged for the call.
- Prohibits autodialed calls that engage two or more lines of a multi-line business.
- Prohibits unsolicited advertising faxes.
- In the event of a violation of the TCPA, a subscriber may (1) sue for up to $500 for each violation or recover actual monetary loss, whichever is greater, (2) seek an injunction, or (3) both.
- In the event of a willful violation of the TCPA, a subscriber may sue for up to three time the damages, i.e. $1,500, for each violation.

When Congress passed the TCPA in 1991, it delegated the do-not-call rules to the FCC. Congress suggested that the FCC's do-not-call regulations "may require the establishment and operation of a single national database." The FCC did not adopt a single national database but rather required each company to maintain its own do-not-call database. The FCC's initial do-not-call list regulations were ineffective at proactively stopping unsolicited calls because the consumer had to make a do-not-call request for each telemarketer. In 2003, even though the FCC was the agency entrusted with the TCPA, it was the Federal Trade Commission that established the National Do Not Call Registry and implemented regulations prohibiting commercial telemarketers from making unsolicited sales calls to persons who did not wish to receive them. After being challenged in court by the telemarketing industry, the National Do Not Call Registry received Congressional ratification in the speedy enactment of Do-Not-Call Implementation Act. In 2013, the Philadelphia Federal Appeals Court held that consent to receive calls from collectors, banks, or telemarketers to consumers' cell phones may be revoked by the consumer.

The CAN-SPAM Act made a minor amendment to the TCPA to explicitly apply the TCPA to calls and faxes originating from outside the U.S.

The portions of the TCPA related to unsolicited advertising faxes were amended by the Junk Fax Prevention Act of 2005.

In February 2024, the FCC issued a Declaratory Ruling that speech synthesis via generative audio (deepfakes) is considered an "artificial" voice for the purposes of the TCPA.

== Private right of action ==
Though the TCPA is a federal statute, suits brought by consumers against violators are frequently filed in state courts. The TCPA is unusual in that the language creating a private right of action led to conflicting views on whether the federal courts had federal question subject matter jurisdiction. The TCPA provides in relevant part: "A person or entity may, if otherwise permitted by the laws or rules of court of a State, bring in an appropriate court of that State. ..." Prior to January 2012, there was a circuit split among the federal appeals courts on the issue of whether federal courts have federal question, diversity jurisdiction (individually or under the Class Action Fairness Act of 2005), or whether the state courts have exclusive jurisdiction. In 2012, the Supreme Court decided Mims v. Arrow Fin. Servs., LLC, which resolved the circuit split by concluding that "The TCPA's permissive grant of jurisdiction to state courts does not deprive the U.S. district courts of federal-question jurisdiction over private TCPA suits."

== Major court cases ==
The TCPA's constitutionality was challenged by telemarketers soon after it was enacted. Two cases, Moser v. FCC, 46 F.3d 970 (9th Cir. 1995) cert. denied, 515 U.S. 1161 (1995) and Destination Ventures Ltd. v. FCC, 46 F.3d 54 (9th Cir. 1995) effectively settled this issue finding the restrictions in the TCPA were constitutional.

The Ninth Circuit held that the TCPA applies to unsolicited cellular telephone text messages advertising the commercial availability of goods or services as "calls" made in violation of the act: In June 2007, a ruling (later overturned) was handed down in class action case Satterfield v. Simon & Schuster, No. C 06-2893 CW, 2007 U.S. Dist. LEXIS 46325 (N.D. Cal. June 26, 2007), a case involving the transmission of SMS text messages promoting a popular author's "mobile club" to cellular phones, the service provider that actually sent the messages. The defendants, potentially 90 million dollar lawsuit against publishing giant Simon & Schuster, argued that the named subscriber, the child's mother, had consented to the transmission of promotional messages when, to receive a free ringtone, she checked the box in an online form labeled "Yes! I would like to receive promotions from Nextones affiliates and brands...." Judge Claudia Wilken ruled that the SMS text messages are not covered by the TCPA, first, because the manner in which the SMS messages were sent does not fit the statutory definition of an "automatic telephone dialing system," and second, because the plaintiff had agreed to receive promotional messages under a broadly worded consent provision, executed in connection with the download of a free ringtone. The Ninth Circuit Court of Appeals reversed and reinstated the potentially 90 million dollar lawsuit against publishing giant Simon & Schuster. A settlement was finally approved by Judge Claudia Wilken on August 6, 2010, which would pay out $175 to each class member who files a claim.

In April 2005 a class action lawsuit against Jamster! was filed. The lawsuit alleges that Jamster! scammed cellular telephone customers through the use of fraudulent and deceptive advertisements. The plaintiffs argue that the ads in question offered one free ring tone to cell phone customers who responded to the ad via text message, but failed to inform users that they would be subscribed to a monthly service. The lawsuit was combined with four others and settled in November 2009.

In August 2014, Capital One Financial Corp., AllianceOne Receivables Management Inc., Leading Edge Recovery Solutions, LLC and Capital Management Services, L.P. entered into an agreement to pay $75.5 million to end a consolidated class action lawsuit pending in the United States District Court for the Northern District of Illinois alleging that the companies used an automated dialer to call customers' cellphones without consent. This is the largest proposed cash settlement under the TCPA to date. It is notable that this legal action involved informational telephone calls, which are not subject to the "prior express written consent" requirements which have been in place for telemarketing calls since October 2013.

The United States Supreme Court resolved a significant circuit split to decide that federal courts have federal question subject matter jurisdiction in Mims v. Arrow Financial Services, LLC, 565 US 368, 132 S. Ct. 740, 181 L. Ed. 2d 881 (2012).

In 2015, Congress added an exemption to § 227(b)(1)(A)(iii) to allow for robocalls related to federally-owed debt collection. This resulted in the Supreme Court case Barr v. American Assn. of Political Consultants, Inc., 591 U.S. ___ (2020), which ruled this created a content-based restriction on free speech that failed strict scrutiny, and invalidated the exemption but leaving the rest of the statute in place due to severability.

In January 2017, the Ninth Circuit Court of Appeals found two text messages were enough to obtain Article III standing.

In August 2019, the 11th Circuit Court of Appeals found a single text message was not enough to obtain Article III standing under TCPA.

In July 2020, the US Supreme Court found the "government-debt" exception to the TCPA was unconstitutional. The "government-debt" exception was added as an amendment to the TCPA in 2015. The case, Barr v. American Assn. of Political Consultants, Inc., was brought by political groups that desired to use robocalls for political ads. The court found the TCPA did unconstitutionally favor debt collection speech over political speech and violated the First Amendment.

In July 2020, the Southern District of Texas found a single text message was enough to obtain Article III standing.

In September 2020, the Eastern District of Texas found a single missed call using a localized number was enough to trigger Article III standing under TCPA. The court reasoned, "At issue in this case is a missed call, not a single, unsolicited text message. It only takes one glance at a text message to recognize it is for an extended warranty for a car you have never owned or a cruise you have won from a raffle you never entered. A missed call with a familiar area code, on the other hand, is more difficult to immediately dismiss as an automated message."

In October 2020, the Northern District of Ohio found the TCPA was unconstitutional from 2015 through 2020 due to the "government-debt" exception, which exempted calls made to collect a debt owed or guaranteed by the United States. The defective provision was severed from the TCPA in 2020. The Ohio court reasoned the severance did not apply retroactively, so the court lacked jurisdiction over all claims from 2015 through 2020.

In December 2020, the District Court for the Southern District of Ohio found that a consumer can revoke consent to be contacted by the holder of a debt, and a third party debt collector calling on behalf of the holder can be held liable for TCPA violations even if the revoked consent was not communicated to the third party debt collector. Specifically the court found "[a] third party debt collection agency is liable for autodialed calls under the TCPA when the consumer has revoked his prior express consent to be called, even when that revocation has not been communicated to the debt collector or the debt collector otherwise fails to confirm the consumer has consented to calls."

Andrew Perrong, a Philadelphia attorney, has filed at least 45 TCPA lawsuits against a wide variety of businesses, ranging from chimney sweeps and collection agencies to large businesses like Verizon and Citibank. Perrong has demanded tens of thousands of dollars in some cases, and most of his suits are settled quickly. It is unknown how much money Perrong has made from his settlements. His first settlement occurred in 2015 while a senior at La Salle College High School.

In the Supreme Court decision Facebook v. Duguid (2021), the Court established that for a device to qualify as an "automatic telephone dialing system", it must be based on the capacity to store or produce numbers from a random or sequential generator. The case ruled that an automatic system that may phone a user from a stored number but otherwise not generated in a random or sequential way (such as for two-factor authentication) does not meet this definition under the TCPA.

== FCC actions ==
Since 2015, the FCC has ordered violators of the TCPA to pay $208.4 million. The sum includes forfeiture orders in cases involving robocalling, Do Not Call Registry and telephone solicitation violations. According to records obtained by the Wall Street Journal in 2019, the government had collected $6,790 of that amount.

In March 2021 the FCC issued a fine of $225 million against the Texas-based telemarketers John C. Spiller and Jakob A. Mears, after they made approximately one billion robocalls to people across the country. The pair used business names including Rising Eagle and JSquared Telecom, were responsible for the calls. One of the people involved in the scheme admitted to making "millions" of robocalls per day, even going so far as to go out of his way to call numbers on the Do Not Call list because he believed it would be more profitable to do so.

On June 6, 2023, the FCC imposed a $5,134,500 fine against Jack Burkman and Jacob Wohl, who had used robocalls in swing states to commit voter intimidation during the 2020 United States presidential election. New York District Judge Victor Marrero accused them of specifically targeting areas with large African American populations. The fine was the largest to have ever been imposed under the TCPA.

== See also ==
- Telemarketing
- Autodialer
- Campbell-Ewald Co. v. Gomez
- Truth in Caller ID Act of 2009
