= Legion of Mary (band) =

American rock band (1974–1975)

- Origin: San Francisco Bay Area
- Genres: Rock
- Years active: 1974–1975
- Label: Rhino
- Past members: Jerry Garcia; Merl Saunders; Martin Fierro; John Kahn; Ron Tutt

Legion of Mary was an American rock band, formed by Jerry Garcia of the Grateful Dead and his friend and musical collaborator Merl Saunders. The band existed from July 1974 to July 1975, and played about 60 live shows. Its members were Garcia (guitar and vocals), Saunders (keyboards and vocals), John Kahn (bass guitar), Martin Fierro (saxophone and flute) and Ron Tutt (drums). The previous lineup of the band, with Paul Humphrey on drums, is sometimes also referred to as Legion of Mary, but later research has shown that they did not use the Legion of Mary name.

In their concerts, Legion of Mary played rock music that had an eclectic mix of influences, including blues, funk, reggae, rock and roll, and especially jazz. Performances included extended improvisational solos, which Garcia made famous with his role in the Grateful Dead.

== Discography ==
Legion of Mary: The Jerry Garcia Collection, Vol. 1 is a two-CD album recorded live at various shows from December 1974 to July 1975. It was released by Rhino Records on August 23, 2005.

Garcia Live Volume Three is a three-CD album recorded on December 14 and 15, 1974. It was released by ATO Records on October 15, 2013.

Pure Jerry: Keystone Berkeley, September 1, 1974 is a three-CD album containing a complete concert by an earlier lineup of the band, not yet known as Legion of Mary, with Paul Humphrey on drums. It was released by Pure Jerry Records on December 28, 2004.
