= Christopher Sabec =

American businessman

- Occupation(s): Entertainment Attorney, Entrepreneur
- Known for: Rightscorp, Inc.

Christopher Sabec is an entertainment attorney, manager, and entrepreneur who has worked with Dave Matthews Band, Hanson, the Jerry Garcia Estate and Tea Leaf Green. Sabec is also the co-founder and CEO of Rightscorp, Inc., the copyright monetization company.

== Career ==
=== Music management ===
After graduating from University of Georgia School of Law in Athens, Georgia in 1992, Sabec moved to Richmond, VA and was introduced to Dave Matthews. Later, as music attorney for Dave Mathews, Sabec assisted in negotiating Matthews' first recording contract with RCA Records and in setting up his music publishing company, Colden Grey.

In 1994, Sabec met Zac, Isaac and Taylor Hanson at the South by Southwest music conference barbecue in Austin, Texas. Sabec signed the three boys aged 8, 11 and 13 to a management contract and got them signed to Mercury Records.

In November 2002, Sabec was hired as chief executive of the Jerry Garcia Estate. Under Sabec's management the first live release in to retail was After Midnight, a multitrack recording from Kean College, 1980. He went on to put out between three and four new releases a year from the vault of more than 500 concerts.

=== Speaking ===
Sabec was a panelist at South by Southwest Music Conference in March, 2000 and has taught music industry continuing education courses at the San Francisco Music Tech Summit.

Christopher Sabec was one of the first managers of major label artists to promote the downloading of MP3s as a promotional and marketing tool. In 1998, Christopher, was interviewed by then CEO of MP3.com, Michael Robertson, where he talked about how MP3s were going to change the music industry.

=== Rightscorp ===
Sabec was the co-founder and CEO of Rightscorp, Inc. The company acts on behalf of entertainment studios, artists, or copyright holders, sending notices to copyright infringers to offer the downloader several options for financial restitution. The notice sent provides a settlement option through Rightscorp for $20 per infringement. If the user chooses not to pay and has repeatedly violated copyright infringements, the ISP may suspend or terminate the subscriber account until a settlement is reached.

Rightscorp, Inc. went public in October 2013, trading on the OTCQB under the ticker RIHT.

=== Class Action Lawsuit ===
On November 21, 2014, Morgan Pietz of The Pietz Law Firm, together with Drew Pomerance of Roxborough, Pomerance, Nye & Adreani filed a Class action Lawsuit against Christopher Sabec, Robert Steele, and Craig Harmon, and Rightscorp, Inc. as well as various John Does.

The complaint sought class certification against Rightscorp, Inc. for violations of the Telephone Consumer Protection Act, the Fair Debt Collection Practices Act, California's Rosenthal Act, and abuse of process for willfull misuse of subpoena power by issuing special DMCA subpoenas, under 17 U.S.C. § 512(h).

Pietz's original plaintiff withdrew from the case and, after locating replacements, half the claims were dropped. The court struck down one of two of the claims and Pietz's client was ordered to pay legal fees.
