= Well-Matched: The Best of Merl Saunders & Jerry Garcia =

Compilation album by Merl Saunders and Jerry Garcia
- Released: May 23, 2006
- Recorded: 1971–1974
- Genres: Rock, jazz-rock, rhythm and blues
- Length: 78:04
- Label: Fantasy

Merl Saunders and Jerry Garcia chronology
Legion of Mary: The Jerry Garcia Collection, Vol. 1 (2005)	Well-Matched: The Best of Merl Saunders & Jerry Garcia (2006)	Keystone Companions: The Complete 1973 Fantasy Recordings (2012)

Merl Saunders chronology
Live On Tour (2006)	Well-Matched: The Best of Merl Saunders & Jerry Garcia (2006)	Keystone Companions: The Complete 1973 Fantasy Recordings (2012)

Jerry Garcia chronology
Garcia Plays Dylan (2005)	Well-Matched: The Best of Merl Saunders & Jerry Garcia (2006)	Pure Jerry: Coliseum, Hampton, VA, November 9, 1991 (2006)

Well-Matched: The Best of Merl Saunders & Jerry Garcia is a retrospective album by Merl Saunders and Jerry Garcia. It contains selections from six of their albums, along with one previously unreleased track, all recorded between 1971 and 1974. It was released on CD by Fantasy Records on May 23, 2006.

The albums excerpted on Well-Matched are Heavy Turbulence (released in 1972), Fire Up (1973), Live at Keystone (1973), Keystone Encores Volume I (1988), Keystone Encores Volume II (1988), and Keepers (1997).

== Critical reception ==
Professional ratings
Review scores
Source	Rating
Allmusic	4/5 stars
Glide	3.5/5 stars
Sea of Tranquility	4/5 stars

On Allmusic, Steve Leggett said, "[Saunders and Garcia led a band] specializing in a graceful mix of jazz, R&B, blues, gospel, and light funk with hints of bop, fusion, and even reggae. Aside from the two-volume Live at Keystone (1973), most of the group's recorded output appeared on various Saunders releases on Fantasy Records, and this remarkably cohesive compilation picks key tracks from all of these, with roughly half of the set coming from the Keystone LPs. Garcia is in full flight here as a guitarist, with Saunders' soul-jazz organ giving things a wonderfully fluid feel, and the end result is a kind of laid-back West Coast jazz-rock that is very much the sum of its parts.

In Glide magazine, Shawn Donohue wrote, "... the music presented here is superb and will prove especially profound for those recreational fans that aren’t as familiar with the duo's past efforts. Garcia always seems to be musically smiling while he is onstage with Saunders, and his playing is precise while Saunders' keys babble along, coaxing Garcia to hit the right notes for maximum effect. It's quite a different ride from his Grateful Dead days. If you're new to this musical tag-team, grab this album as a jumping off point, you will not be disappointed."

On Sea of Tranquility, Mike Blackburn said, "During that four to five year period, and under Saunder's loose Art Tatum based jazz tutelage, Garcia reined in his free flowing solo style somewhat, injecting some discipline and fire into his playing. The result was a Well-Matched collaboration indeed, resulting in this fiery yet harmonic display of musical expression. Of the bounty of work Jerry created outside the confines of the Dead (who were also arguably hitting their commercial peak during those early 70s), these jams and collaborations represent perhaps the very best."

== Track listing ==
No.	Title	Writer(s)	Original album	Length
1.	"Mystery Train"	Sam Phillips, Junior Parker	Keystone Encores	11:32
2.	"Lonely Avenue"	Doc Pomus	Fire Up	8:53
3.	"Merl's Tune"	Merl Saunders, John White	Keystone Encores	13:32
4.	"Positively 4th Street"	Bob Dylan	Live at Keystone	7:43
5.	"After Midnight"	JJ Cale	Fire Up	5:03
6.	"Welcome to the Basement"	Saunders, Eddie Moore	Heavy Turbulence	6:16
7.	"That's All Right"	Arthur Crudup	Keepers	5:07
8.	"Space"	Saunders, Jerry Garcia, John Kahn, Bill Vitt	Live at Keystone	3:51
9.	"I Second That Emotion"	Smokey Robinson, Al Cleveland	previously unreleased	9:45
10.	"The Harder They Come"	Jimmy Cliff	Live at Keystone	6:22

== Personnel ==
=== Musicians ===
- Merl Saunders – keyboards, vocals
- Jerry Garcia – guitar, vocals
- John Kahn – bass
- Bill Vitt – drums on "Mystery Train", "Merl's Tune", "Positively 4th Street", "After Midnight", "Space", "I Second That Emotion", "The Harder They Come"
- Bill Kreutzmann – drums on "Lonely Avenue"
- The Hawkins Singers (Walter, Tramaine, Lynette, Feddie) – vocals on "Lonely Avenue"
- David Grisman – mandolin on "Positively Fourth Street" and "That's All Right"
- Tom Fogerty – guitar on "After Midnight", "Welcome to the Basement"
- Eddie Moore – drums on "Welcome to the Basement"
- Kenneth Nash – percussion on "Welcome to the Basement"
- Bob Drew – alto saxophone on "Welcome to the Basement"
- Tower of Power – horns on "Welcome to the Basement"
- Vassar Clements – fiddle on "That's All Right"
- E.W. Wainwright – drums on "That's All Right"

=== Production ===
- Compilation: David Gans
- Production coordinator: Stuart Kremsky
- Remastering: Joe Tarantino
- Design: Linda Kalin, Deb Sibony
- Photography: Annie Leibovitz, Tony Lane, Phil Bray
- Liner notes: Blair Jackson
