= Garcia Plays Dylan =

Compilation album by Jerry Garcia
- Released: October 25, 2005
- Recorded: 1973–1995
- Genre: Rock, folk
- Label: Rhino

Jerry Garcia chronology
Pure Jerry: Warner Theatre, March 18, 1978 (2005)	Garcia Plays Dylan (2005)	Well-Matched: The Best of Merl Saunders & Jerry Garcia (2006)

Professional ratings
Review scores
Source	Rating
Allmusic	3.5/5 stars
The Music Box	4/5 stars

Garcia Plays Dylan is an album composed of various live performances featuring Jerry Garcia playing covers of Bob Dylan songs. It is culled from performances from 1973–1995, and features Garcia playing with Grateful Dead, Legion of Mary, Jerry Garcia Band, and Garcia-Saunders. Garcia takes lead vocals on all tracks.

Another collection, Postcards of the Hanging, features more Dylan covers performed by the Grateful Dead (with lead vocals shared among Garcia, Bob Weir and Phil Lesh).

== Track listing ==
All songs composed by Bob Dylan, except "Tears of Rage" by Richard Manuel and Bob Dylan.

Disc one

1. "It Takes a Lot to Laugh, It Takes a Train to Cry" – 8:12
2. "Tough Mama" – 9:17
3. "Positively 4th Street" – 10:46
4. "The Wicked Messenger" – 13:20
5. "Knockin' on Heaven's Door" – 17:15
6. "Simple Twist Of Fate" – 10:58
7. "I Shall Be Released" – 7:40

Disc two

1. "When I Paint My Masterpiece" – 14:00
2. "She Belongs to Me" (Note: Later released with entire concert on Dave's Picks Volume 49) – 6:31
3. "Forever Young" – 9:05
4. "Tangled Up In Blue" (Note: Later released with entire concert on Garcia Live Volume 19) – 11:48
5. "Senor (Tales of Yankee Power)" – 7:16
6. "Visions of Johanna" – 9:21
7. "Quinn the Eskimo (The Mighty Quinn)" – 5:15
8. "It's All Over Now, Baby Blue" (Note: Later released with entire concert on Spring 1990) – 7:07

Notes

Bonus Disc – Garcia Plays Dylan Again

1. "It Takes a Lot to Laugh, It Takes a Train to Cry" (acoustic) – 5:38
2. "Tears of Rage" – 8:19
3. "Going, Going, Gone" – 18:56

== Track information ==
Disc one

1. Jerry Garcia & Merl Saunders. Recorded Live at The Boarding House, San Francisco, CA (1/25/73)
2. Jerry Garcia Band. Recorded Live at Keystone, Berkeley, CA (11/18/75)
3. Jerry Garcia Band. Recorded Live at Keystone, Berkeley, CA (11/17/75)
4. Legion Of Mary. Recorded Live at Oriental Theatre, Milwaukee, WI (4/19/75)
5. Jerry Garcia Band. Recorded Live at Sophie's, Palo Alto, CA (2/15/76) (?)
6. Jerry Garcia Band. Recorded Live at Santa Cruz Civic Auditorium, Santa Cruz, CA (2/19/78)
7. Jerry Garcia Band. Recorded Live at the Warfield Theatre, San Francisco, CA (11/28/87)

Disc two

1. Jerry Garcia Band. Recorded Live at The Stone, San Francisco, CA (2/2/80)
2. Grateful Dead. Recorded Live at Frost Amphitheater, Palo Alto, CA (4/28/85)
3. Jerry Garcia Band. Recorded Live at the Warfield Theatre, San Francisco, CA (3/4/88)
4. Jerry Garcia Band. Recorded Live at Oakland Coliseum, Oakland, CA (10/31/92)
5. Jerry Garcia Band. Recorded Live at the Warfield Theatre, San Francisco, CA (4/23/93)
6. Grateful Dead. Recorded Live at Soldier Field, Chicago, IL (7/8/95)
7. Grateful Dead. Recorded Live at Sullivan Stadium, Foxboro, MA (7/2/89)
8. Grateful Dead. Recorded Live at Copps Coliseum, Hamilton, Ontario (3/22/90)

Bonus Disc - "Garcia Plays Dylan Again"

1. Garcia/Kahn. Neighbors of Woodcraft, Portland, OR - late show (06/04/82)
2. Jerry Garcia Band. Greek Theater, Berkeley, CA - (08/05/90)
3. Legion Of Mary. Keystone, Berkeley, CA - (05/22/75)

== Credits ==
- Jerry Garcia - guitar, vocals

=== Jerry Garcia & Merl Saunders ===
- Merl Saunders - organ
- John Kahn - electric bass
- Bill Vitt - drums

=== Jerry Garcia Band ===
- John Kahn - bass
- Ozzie Ahlers, Keith Godchaux, Nicky Hopkins - keyboards
- Buzz Buchanan, Johnny de Fonseca, David Kemper, Ron Tutt - drums
- Donna Godchaux, Gloria Jones, Jackie LaBranch - vocals

=== Legion of Mary ===
- Merl Saunders - organ
- John Kahn - bass
- Ron Tutt - drums
- Martin Fierro - saxophone

=== Grateful Dead ===
- Bob Weir - guitar, vocals
- Phil Lesh - bass, vocals
- Brent Mydland - keyboards, vocals on disc 2, tracks 2 & 7-8
- Mickey Hart - drums
- Bill Kreutzmann - drums
- Vince Welnick - keyboards on disc 2, track 6

== See also ==
- List of songs written by Bob Dylan
- List of artists who have covered Bob Dylan songs
