= Garcia Live Volume Six =

2016 live album by Jerry Garcia and Merl Saunders

Live album by Jerry Garcia and Merl Saunders
- Released: June 24, 2016
- Recorded: July 5, 1973
- Venue: The Lion's Share; San Anselmo, California
- Genre: Rock, rhythm and blues
- Length: 179:25
- Label: ATO
- Producer: Marc Allan

Merl Saunders and Jerry Garcia chronology
Garcia Live Volume Three (2013)	Garcia Live Volume Six (2016)	Garcia Live Volume Nine (2017)

Jerry Garcia chronology
On Broadway: Act One – October 28th, 1987 (2015)	Garcia Live Volume Six (2016)	Garcia Live Volume Seven (2016)

Garcia Live Volume Six is a three-CD live album by Jerry Garcia and Merl Saunders. It was recorded on July 5, 1973, at the Lion's Share in San Anselmo, California. It was released on June 24, 2016.

From February 1971 to July 1975, Jerry Garcia and Merl Saunders played many live shows together when the Grateful Dead were not on tour. Their band's lineup for the Lion's Share concert was Garcia on guitar and vocals, Saunders on keyboards and vocals, John Kahn on bass, and Bill Vitt on drums. A few days later, the band played two shows at the Keystone in Berkeley, California, that are documented in the albums Live at Keystone, Keystone Encores, and Keystone Companions.

== Critical reception ==
Professional ratings
Review scores
Source	Rating
All About Jazz	4/5 stars

On PopMatters, Jedd Beaudoin said, "A total of eight official releases from that [Garcia and Saunders] partnership exist, including a 1974 date from the Keystone. But this one, tracked at the small-ish Lion's Share just after Independence Day '73, is the one that takes them all.... The song selection is choice and the group sounds hungry for new musical heights.... Now, if we could just find out who the heck is playing trumpet we'd be in great shape."

Doug Collette of All About Jazz called the album "a distinctive entry in the solo discography of guitarist/songwriter/vocalist Jerry Garcia," and noted that it "documents a starting point for ongoing endeavors he would refine the remainder of his life."

Writing for No Depression, Mike Seely commented: "The music doesn't merely distract you; it teleports you to another sphere of reality. You're lost out there with Jerry, uninterested in heading home. You forget about life for awhile, which isn't too far removed from being gratefully dead."

A reviewer for Aquarium Drunkard stated: "intimacy and freedom were on the menu that night while outfitting themselves with a wrecking crew of a rhythm section... this new set adds an additional 3 hours to the party that (seemingly) never wants to end."

Jeff Wilson of The Absolute Sound remarked: "it's nice to hear a musician whose improvisational wizardry can match Garcia's, as Saunders delivers solos as colorful, unpredictable, and yes, 'mind-blowing' as the Fat Man's."

== Track listing ==
Disc one
First set:

1. "After Midnight" (JJ Cale) – 10:35
2. "Someday Baby" (Lightnin' Hopkins) – 9:14
3. "She's Got Charisma" -> (Merl Saunders) – 18:40
4. "That's Alright, Mama" (Arthur Crudup) – 13:16

Disc two

1. "The System" (Saunders, Pamela Carrier) – 18:45
2. "The Night They Drove Old Dixie Down" (Robbie Robertson) – 6:00

Second set:

3. "I Second That Emotion" (Al Cleveland, Smokey Robinson) – 13:29
4. "My Funny Valentine" (Richard Rodgers, Lorenz Hart) – 19:16
5. "Finders Keepers" (General Johnson, Jeffrey Bowen) – 9:29

Disc three

1. "Money Honey" (Jesse Stone) – 8:37
2. "Like a Road" (Don Nix, Dan Penn) – 9:21
3. "Merl's Tune" -> (Saunders, John White) – 16:44
4. "Lion's Share Jam" (Jerry Garcia, John Kahn, Saunders, Bill Vitt) – 9:52
5. "How Sweet It Is (To Be Loved by You)" (Brian Holland, Lamont Dozier, Eddie Holland) – 6:04

== Personnel ==
Musicians

- Jerry Garcia – guitar, vocals
- Merl Saunders – keyboards, vocals
- John Kahn – bass
- Bill Vitt – drums
- Mike Price – trumpet on the second set

Production

- Produced for release by Marc Allan
- Original recordings produced by Jerry Garcia
- Associate producer: Kevin Monty
- Recording: Betty Cantor-Jackson
- Mastering: Fred Kevorkian
- Curation: Marc Allan, Kevin Monty
- Project coordination: Lauren Goetzinger, Robby Saady
- Art direction, design, illustration: Ryan Corey
- Liner notes essay: Benjy Eisen
- Archival research: Merl Saunders, Jr.
- Photos: Roberto Rabanne
