= Garcia Live Volume 18 =

Live album by Jerry Garcia and Merl Saunders
- Released: June 10, 2022
- Recorded: November 2, 1974
- Venue: Keystone Berkeley
- Genres: Rock, rhythm and blues
- Label: ATO
- Producers: Marc Allan, Kevin Monty

Merl Saunders and Jerry Garcia chronology
Garcia Live Volume 15 (2020)	Garcia Live Volume 18 (2022)	Garcia Live Volume 22 (2026)

Jerry Garcia chronology
Garcia Live Volume 17 (2021)	Garcia Live Volume 18 (2022)	Garcia Live Volume 19 (2022)

Garcia Live Volume 18 is a two-CD album by Jerry Garcia and Merl Saunders. It contains the complete concert recorded on November 2, 1974 at the Keystone in Berkeley, California. It was released on June 10, 2022.

In the early- to mid-1970s Jerry Garcia and Merl Saunders performed many live shows together, mostly in the San Francisco Bay Area, and released the album Live at Keystone. Garcia Live Volume 18 features the July 1974 to January 1975 lineup of their band, with Garcia on guitar and vocals, Saunders on keyboards and vocals, Martin Fierro on saxophone and flute, John Kahn on bass, and Paul Humphrey on drums.

== Critical reception ==
In Glide Magazine Doug Collette said, "... each member of the band is as engaged in their respective role as the others, so the five-piece literally and figuratively sounds far bigger and more versatile than its number might allow. Fortunately, all such aspects of the musicianship come through thoroughly in Fred Kevorkian’s mastering of original recordings by the famed Betty Cantor-Jackson."

== Track listing ==
Disc 1

First set:

1. "Neighbor, Neighbor" (Alton Joseph Valier, Huey Meaux) – 11:10
2. "Valdez in the Country" (Donny Hathaway) – 17:11
3. "The Harder They Come" (Jimmy Cliff) – 16:31
4. "You Can Leave Your Hat On" (Randy Newman) – 12:06
5. "That's the Touch I Like" (Jesse Winchester) – 9:21

Disc 2

Second set:

1. "Freedom Jazz Dance" (Eddie Harris) – 11:34
2. "Tough Mama" (Bob Dylan) – 10:07
3. "Wondering Why" (Merl Saunders, Pam Carrier) – 21:28
4. "People Make the World Go Round" (Thom Bell, Linda Creed) – 4:28
5. "Mystery Train" (Junior Parker, Sam Phillips) – 14:56

== Personnel ==
Musicians

- Jerry Garcia – guitar, vocals
- Merl Saunders – keyboards, vocals
- Martin Fierro – saxophone, flute, percussion
- John Kahn – bass
- Paul Humphrey – drums

Production

- Produced for release by Marc Allan, Kevin Monty
- Recording: Betty Cantor-Jackson
- Mastering: Fred Kevorkian
- Project coordinator: Lauren Goetzinger
- Design, illustration: Lawrence Azerrad
- Layout: Danny Cash
- Liner notes essay: Gary Lambert
- Photos: John Conroy, Dr. Bob Marks
- Front cover artwork: Jerry Garcia
