= Garcia Live Volume 12 =

Live album by Jerry Garcia and Merl Saunders
- Released: December 20, 2019
- Recorded: January 23, 1973
- Venue: The Boarding House; San Francisco
- Genre: Rock, rhythm and blues
- Length: 186:33
- Label: ATO
- Producer: Marc Allan, Kevin Monty

Merl Saunders and Jerry Garcia chronology
Garcia Live Volume Nine (2017)	Garcia Live Volume 12 (2019)	Garcia Live Volume 15 (2020)

Jerry Garcia chronology
Garcia Live Volume 11 (2019)	Garcia Live Volume 12 (2019)	Bear's Sonic Journals: Dawn of the New Riders of the Purple Sage (2020)

Garcia Live Volume 12 is a three-CD live album by Jerry Garcia and Merl Saunders. It contains the complete concert recorded on January 23, 1973 at the Boarding House in San Francisco. It was released on December 20, 2019.

At this concert, Jerry Garcia (electric guitar, vocals) and Merl Saunders (keyboards, vocals) were accompanied by their usual rhythm section of John Kahn (bass guitar) and Bill Vitt (drums). They were joined by vocalist Sarah Fulcher, who often sang with the band in the early part of 1973.

== Critical reception ==
On AllMusic, Fred Thomas wrote, "On this date, Saunders and Garcia are more grounded in blues- and soul-rocking than the often-cosmic psychedelia of the Grateful Dead, but the creative chemistry of the band still explores the outer reaches of improvisation.... The relaxed energy and loose performances capture the magical connection Garcia and Saunders found in these low-pressure gigs. The powerful addition of Fulcher's presence makes Garcia Live, Vol. 12 a mandatory footnote to the scope of Garcia's creative output."

In Glide Magazine, Doug Collette wrote, "Garcia Live Volume 12 offers some of, if not the most, spirited, edgy performances yet released in this archival series. And while it’s not quite accurate to assign all the credit to vocalist Sarah Fulcher as the catalyst for this combustible content, it is no coincidence she is featured prominently in photos within the twelve-page booklet... As it was evolving here, roughly three years into their ongoing collaborations, Jerry Garcia's relationship with Merl Saunders was becoming one of the most fulfilling of his life and career."

== Track listing ==
Disc one

First set:

1. "Expressway (To Your Heart)" (Kenny Gamble, Leon Huff) – 15:09
2. "It's Too Late" (Chuck Willis) – 7:33
3. "The System" > (Merl Saunders, Pamela Dianne Carrier) – 20:04
4. "Honey Chile" (Richard Morris, Sylvia Moy) – 13:49
5. "Money Honey" (Jesse Stone) – 7:35

Disc two

1. "I Know It's a Sin" (Jimmy Reed, Mary Reed) – 10:23
2. "Find a Rainbow" (Sarah Fulcher) – 11:37
3. "The Night They Drove Old Dixie Down" (Robbie Robertson) – 6:24

Second set:

4. "It Takes a Lot to Laugh, It Takes a Train to Cry" (Bob Dylan) – 8:12
5. "I Was Made to Love Her" (Henry Cosby, Lula Mae Hardaway, Sylvia Moy, Stevie Wonder) – 12:10
6. "Lonely Avenue" (Doc Pomus) – 12:27
7. "Go Climb a Mountain" (Sarah Fulcher) – 14:26

Disc three

1. "That's All Right, Mama" (Arthur Crudup) – 11:18
2. "Georgia on My Mind" (Hoagy Carmichael, Stuart Gorrell) – 15:18
3. "I Second That Emotion" (Smokey Robinson, Al Cleveland) – 11:57
4. "How Sweet It Is (To Be Loved by You)" (Lamont Dozier, Brian Holland, Eddie Holland) – 8:08

== Personnel ==
Musicians

- Jerry Garcia – guitar, vocals
- Merl Saunders – keyboards, vocals
- Sarah Fulcher – vocals
- John Kahn – bass
- Bill Vitt – drums

Production

- Produced by Marc Allan, Kevin Monty
- Project Coordination by Lauren Goetzinger
- Recording: Betty Cantor, Rex Jackson
- Mixing: Jonathan Wilson, Dave Cerminara
- Mastering: Fred Kevorkian
- Design, illustration: Ryan Corey
- Liner notes: Jesse Jarnow
- Photos: Jim Needham
