= Keystone Companions: The Complete 1973 Fantasy Recordings =

Live album by Merl Saunders and Jerry Garcia
- Released: September 25, 2012
- Recorded: July 10 – 11, 1973
- Genre: Rock
- Label: Fantasy
- Producers: Merl Saunders, Jerry Garcia, John Kahn, Bill Vitt

Merl Saunders and Jerry Garcia chronology
Well-Matched: The Best of Merl Saunders & Jerry Garcia (2006)	Keystone Companions: The Complete 1973 Fantasy Recordings (2012)	Garcia Live Volume Three (2013)

Jerry Garcia chronology
Ragged but Right (2010)	Keystone Companions: The Complete 1973 Fantasy Recordings (2012)	Garcia Live Volume One (2013)

Keystone Companions: The Complete 1973 Fantasy Recordings is a four-CD album by Merl Saunders and Jerry Garcia. It was recorded live at the Keystone in Berkeley, California on July 10 and 11, 1973, and released by Fantasy Records on September 25, 2012.

From February 1971 to July 1975, Merl Saunders and Jerry Garcia played many live shows together when the Grateful Dead were not on tour. Their band's lineup for the July '73 shows at the Keystone was Saunders on keyboards, Garcia on guitar and vocals, John Kahn on bass, and Bill Vitt on drums.

Some songs from the July 10 and 11, 1973 Keystone concerts were released as the 1973 album Live at Keystone, and others were released in 1988 as Keystone Encores. Keystone Companions includes all of the songs from the two earlier albums (except for the track titled "Space"), along with seven previously unreleased tracks. All the songs were remastered for the new album, and are presented in the order that they were played in concert.

Keystone Companions is packaged as a box set, and includes a booklet with photos and liner notes, a poster, and a button, among other extras.

== Critical reception ==
Professional ratings
Review scores
Source	Rating
Allmusic	4.5/5 stars
Blues Review	8/10
Rolling Stone	4/5 stars

In Rolling Stone, Patrick Doyle wrote, "What's most remarkable about this four-disc set, which compiles two 1973 dates, is the range: They jam on Rodgers and Hart as well as Jimmy Cliff, and turn out the Funkadelic-like instrumental 'Keepers'; Garcia also croons an unexpectedly sweet version of 'Positively 4th Street' amid soaring, melodic guitar solos. There are no rules — just four luminaries testing their own boundaries."

On Allmusic, Thom Jurek said, "Taking it all in, it's fascinating to hear how complementary Garcia and Saunders were, and the degree to which they trusted one another in moving a set arrangement in another direction on the spot. Contrast the two versions of 'My Funny Valentine'. On the latter one, Saunders shifts tonalities from a straight, subdued reading toward a more modal and exploratory one. Garcia responds by extending the tune's entire harmonic reach. The rhythm section, too, is unshakable — check their astonishing interplay and shifting time signatures on the first version of 'Merl's Tune'.... The music, by any standard, is simply excellent."

In Blues Review, Bob Putignano wrote, "I’ve always felt the Saunders brought out and extracted a different side of Garcia, a side that was more jazz-oriented. Blues and rhythm and blues surfaced readily, and the deep grooves (especially from Saunders' B3) allowed Garcia alternate landscapes to explore. Additionally, within the Dead's universe there was far more pressure and egos to deal with. With Merl it seemed obvious that the musical state-of-affairs were more casual, yet no intensity is lost."

On Voice of America, Katherine Cole said, "The music on Keystone Companions' four discs is exactly what you’d expect from a Jerry Garcia side project: a mix of rock, blues and jazz with some bluegrass and soul mixed in. And, as with any jam session, the songs sometimes wander and might even include all those styles of music within the same tune.... Keystone Companions is a fan’s dream come true — it contains two complete sets equaling almost four hours of live music. The tracks were remastered to crystal clarity..."

In Relix, Tony Sclafani wrote, "This new release configures the original recordings in the order in which the songs were performed and also offers vintage photos and liner notes by David Gans. The results are compelling. The spacious, remastered sound brings out the chemistry of the two main players as well as the interplay of the rhythm section, made up of bassist John Kahn and drummer Bill Vitt."

== Track listing ==
Disc 1

1. "Hi-Heel Sneakers" (Robert Higgenbotham) – 8:12
2. "Keepers" (Merl Saunders, John Kahn) – 7:54
3. "The Harder They Come" (Jimmy Cliff) – 6:23
4. "It Takes a Lot to Laugh, It Takes a Train to Cry" (Bob Dylan) – 6:21
5. "It's Too Late (She's Gone)" (Chuck Willis) – 7:47
6. "My Funny Valentine" (Richard Rodgers, Lorenz Hart) – 18:14
7. "Mystery Train" (Sam Phillips, Junior Parker) – 11:37

Disc 2

1. "I Second That Emotion" (Smokey Robinson, Al Cleveland) – 10:59
2. "Someday Baby" (Sam Hopkins) – 10:15
3. "Merl's Tune" (Saunders, John White) – 13:34
4. "It Ain't No Use" (Jerry Williams, Gary Bonds, Don Hollinger) – 9:36
5. "Positively 4th Street" (Dylan) – 7:45
6. "How Sweet It Is (To Be Loved by You)" (Brian Holland, Lamont Dozier, Eddie Holland) – 8:09

Disc 3

1. "It Takes a Lot to Laugh, It Takes a Train to Cry" (Dylan) – 7:06
2. "Keepers" (Saunders, Kahn) – 6:34
3. "One Kind Favor" (Blind Lemon Jefferson) – 6:39
4. "That's All Right, Mama" (Arthur Crudup) – 4:11
5. "The Harder They Come" (Cliff) – 10:09
6. "My Funny Valentine" (Rodgers, Hart) – 18:05
7. "Money Honey" (Jesse Stone) – 8:21

Disc 4

1. "Someday Baby" (Hopkins) – 10:15
2. "Merl's Tune" (Saunders, White) – 12:21
3. "Like a Road Leading Home" (Don Nix, Dan Penn) – 11:02
4. "How Sweet It Is (To Be Loved by You)" (Holland, Dozier, Holland) – 10:20

== Personnel ==
=== Musicians ===
- Merl Saunders – keyboards
- Jerry Garcia – guitar, vocals
- John Kahn – bass
- Bill Vitt – drums
- David Grisman – mandolin on "Positively 4th Street"

=== Production ===
- Produced by Merl Saunders, Jerry Garcia, John Kahn, Bill Vitt
- Compilation producer: Chris Clough
- Recording: Betty Cantor, Rex Jackson
- Mixing: Seth Presant
- Mastering: George Horn, Paul Blakemore
- Cover design: Andrew Pham
- Art direction: Abbey Anna
- Artwork: Susan Brooks
- Photography: Annie Leibovitz, Bob Minkin, Tony Lane
- Liner notes: David Gans
