= Fire Up Plus =

Compilation album by Merl Saunders and Friends
- Released: July 9, 1992
- Recorded: 1971–1973
- Genre: Rock, funk
- Length: 68:53
- Label: Fantasy
- Producer: Merl Saunders, Tom Fogerty, Brian Gardner

Merl Saunders and Jerry Garcia chronology
Keystone Encores (1988)	Fire Up Plus (1992)	Pure Jerry: Keystone Berkeley, September 1, 1974 (2004)

Merl Saunders chronology
Save the Planet So We'll Have Someplace to Boogie (1991)	Fire Up Plus (1992)	It's In the Air (1993)

Jerry Garcia chronology
Jerry Garcia Band (1991)	Fire Up Plus (1992)	Not for Kids Only (1993)

Fire Up Plus is an album by Merl Saunders and Friends. It contains most of the songs from two LPs from the early 1970s — Heavy Turbulence, and Fire Up. It was released on CD by Fantasy Records on July 9, 1992.

Fire Up Plus features Merl Saunders on keyboards and vocals, Jerry Garcia of the Grateful Dead on guitar and vocals, Tom Fogerty of Creedence Clearwater Revival on guitar, John Kahn on bass, and Bill Vitt on drums.

Heavy Turbulence was recorded in the fall of 1971 and released in 1972. All six tracks from that album are included in Fire Up Plus.

Fire Up was recorded between November 1972 and January 1973, and released in 1973. Six of the eight tracks from that album are included in Fire Up Plus. The songs "Charisma (She's Got)" and "Chock-Lite Puddin'" were omitted due to space considerations.

== Critical reception ==
Professional ratings
Review scores
Source	Rating
Allmusic	3.5/5 stars
The Best Of Website	B

On Allmusic, Lindsay Planer said, "Here, [Saunders, Garcia, Fogerty, Kahn, and Vitt] lay down their substantially funky existence onto a considerably eclectic mix of cover tunes and highly inventive originals. Saunders' arrangements — particularly with the Tower of Power brass on "Man-Child" and "Soul Roach" – reveal a hidden talent for the keyboardist. That blending of styles results in a hearty big band sound with the horn section taking a backseat to no one. Saunders alternates between the rubbery funk of "Expressway (To Your Heart)" through to a comparably leaner sound on their redux of JJ Cale's "After Midnight." The lead vocals are split between Saunders and Garcia.

On The Best Of Website, Barry Small wrote, "There are many solid moments on this release, though none better than the lovely blues inspired riffs that Garcia lays out on "Lonely Avenue". I generally prefer the cover versions to the original Merl compositions. John Lennon's song "Imagine" is done instrumentally. The rendition of JJ Cale's "After Midnight" is top notch.... Merl Saunders' Fire Up Plus is a more than worthwhile addition to a CD collection.

Writing about Heavy Turbulence on Allmusic, Eugene Chadbourne said, "This is pretty much a straight rock and funk effort... Since [Fogerty] is such a terrific rhythm guitarist, it is really no surprise that he and Saunders could create such a pumping oil well; this is an album in which the rhythmic feel of each song can never be faulted, no matter how different the approaches might be. The band is really well recorded, the tones thick and fat, and the grooves trembling from the fine organ fondling.... Lead guitar fills by Jerry Garcia are a musical inspiration, as well as probably stimulating much of the original album's sales."

Writing about Fire Up on Allmusic, Chadbourne said, "With both the chops and musical background to lead the somewhat younger rock neophytes on a vision quest, Saunders became something of a galvanizing force, bringing out some of the tightest and strongest performances of the players featured here.... the program wisely emphasizes the leader's clever songwriting; fans of the good ol' boogaloo should enjoy both "Soul Roach" and "Chock-Lite Puddin'." The range of material is narrowly focused into the areas where these players really excel, rather than attempting to be jaw-droppingly eclectic."

== Track listing ==
From Heavy Turbulence:

1. "My Problems Got Problems" (Merl Saunders, Pamela Carrier) – 4:29
2. "The Night They Drove Old Dixie Down" (Robbie Robertson) – 4:03
3. "Save Mother Earth" (Saunders, Edmund Lewis) – 7:18
4. "Imagine" (John Lennon) – 2:36
5. "Welcome to the Basement" (Saunders, Eddie Moore) – 6:12
6. "Man-Child" (Saunders, Lewis) – 12:30

From Fire Up:

7. "After Midnight" (JJ Cale) – 4:58
8. "Expressway to Your Heart" (Kenneth Gamble, Leon A. Huff) – 5:14
9. "Soul Roach" (Saunders, Ray Shanklin) – 4:24
10. "Benedict Rides" (Saunders, Carrier) – 3:03
11. "The System" (Saunders, Carrier) – 3:55
12. "Lonely Avenue" (Doc Pomus) – 8:42

== Personnel ==
=== Musicians ===
- Merl Saunders – keyboards, vocals
- Jerry Garcia – guitar, vocals
- Tom Fogerty – guitar, vocals
- John Kahn – bass; electric piano on "Soul Roach"
- Bill Vitt – drums
- The Hawkins Singers (Edwin, Walter, Tramaine, Lynette, Feddie, Carol) – vocals
- Tower of Power – horns
- Eddie Moore – drums on "Welcome to the Basement"
- Kenneth Nash – percussion on "Welcome to the Basement"
- Bob Drew – alto saxophone on "Welcome to the Basement"
- Gaylord Birch – congas on "Expressway (To Your Heart)"
- Mike Howell – guitar on "Soul Roach"
- Christopher Parker – drums on "Soul Roach"
- Bill Kreutzmann – drums on "Lonely Avenue"

=== Production ===
- Produced by Merl Saunders, Tom Fogerty, Brian Gardner
- Engineer: Brian Gardner
- Assistant engineer: Eddie Harris
- Digital remastering: Phil De Lancie
- Art direction: Phil Carroll
- Design: Jamie Putnam
- Photos: Tony Lane
