= Bill Vitt =

American drummer and keyboardist (1943–2019)

- Born: William Robert Vitt; May 6, 1943; Washington
- Origin: San Francisco Bay Area
- Died: July 16, 2019 (aged 76) home
- Genres: Rock - jazz
- Instrument: Drums - keyboards
- Years active: 1960s–2019
- Formerly of: Brewer & Shipley; Sons of Champlin

Bill Vitt (May 6, 1943 - July 16, 2019, aged 76) was an American drummer and keyboardist. He worked extensively as a live performer and as a session musician. In the 1970s he played with Brewer & Shipley, Jerry Garcia, Merl Saunders, and the Sons of Champlin.

He retired from the music business in the 1980s, but became active again in the 2000s, playing live shows and recording albums. He played the music that he loved until his death. He died with his adoring daughter, Aura, by his side, grateful and content with the life he led

== Discography ==
- Tarkio – Brewer & Shipley – 1970
- Danny Cox – Danny Cox – 1971
- Hooteroll? – Howard Wales and Jerry Garcia – 1971
- Heavy Turbulence – Merl Saunders – 1972
- Rural Space – Brewer & Shipley – 1972
- Tom Fogerty – Tom Fogerty – 1972
- Excalibur – Tom Fogerty – 1972
- Fillmore: The Last Days – various artists – 1972 (as a member of Sons of Champlin)
- Casting Pearls – Mill Valley Bunch – 1972
- Fire Up – Merl Saunders – 1973
- Live at Keystone – Merl Saunders, Jerry Garcia, John Kahn, Bill Vitt – 1973
- Keystone Encores – Merl Saunders, Jerry Garcia, John Kahn, Bill Vitt – 1988
- Fire Up Plus – Merl Saunders and Friends – 1992
- ASAP – David Collini – 1992
- Keepers – Merl Saunders – 1997
- Side Trips, Volume One – Howard Wales and Jerry Garcia – 1998
- Garcia Plays Dylan – Jerry Garcia – 2005
- Well-Matched: The Best of Merl Saunders & Jerry Garcia – Merl Saunders and Jerry Garcia – 2006
- State of Grace – Bill Vitt – 2008
- Keystone Companions: The Complete 1973 Fantasy Recordings – Merl Saunders and Jerry Garcia – 2012
- Back At It Again – Keystone Revisited – 2013
- Garcia Live Volume Six – Jerry Garcia and Merl Saunders – 2016
- Garcia Live Volume Nine – Jerry Garcia and Merl Saunders – 2017
- Garcia Live Volume 12 – Jerry Garcia and Merl Saunders – 2019
- Garcia Live Volume 15 – Jerry Garcia and Merl Saunders – 2020
