= Garcia Live Volume 17 =

Live album by Jerry Garcia Band
- Released: November 12, 2021
- Recorded: November 7 – 13, 1976
- Genres: Rock, rhythm and blues
- Length: 153:04
- Label: Round / ATO
- Producers: Marc Allan; Kevin Monty

Jerry Garcia Band chronology
| Garcia Live Volume 16 (2021) | Garcia Live Volume 17 (2021) | Garcia Live Volume 19 (2022) |

Jerry Garcia chronology
| Garcia Live Volume 16 (2021) | Garcia Live Volume 17 (2021) | Garcia Live Volume 18 (2022) |

Garcia Live Volume 17 is a three-CD live album by the Jerry Garcia Band. It was recorded in November 1976 at several venues in northern California. It was released on November 12, 2021.

The album features the January 1976 to August 1977 lineup of the Jerry Garcia Band, with Jerry Garcia on guitar and vocals, Keith Godchaux on keyboards, Donna Jean Godchaux on vocals, John Kahn on bass, and Ron Tutt on drums.

== Critical reception ==
In Relix Larson Sutton wrote, "Even though the 17th installment of the GarciaLive series breaks a bit from most of the others in the terrific ongoing chain of archival sets – as it is a compilation of cuts from several shows rather than a singular, complete performance – its chosen tracks and sequencing approximate well a Jerry Garcia Band '76 concert. And with the standout version of "Mighty High" closing the three-disc volume, it is one not to be missed."

In Glide Magazine Doug Collette said, "Jerry Garcia must've been happy to just play music come fall of 1976. At least that would seem to be the case, judging from the seeming inexhaustible string of ideas he issues forth with his guitar (plus his strong, pliant vocals) during the approximately two and half hours of music on GarciaLive Volume 17."

== Track listing ==
Disc 1

1. "Sugaree" (Jerry Garcia, Robert Hunter) – 13:47 ^{[C]}
2. "They Love Each Other" (Garcia, Hunter) – 8:40 ^{[C]}
3. "Catfish John" (Bob McDill, Allen Reynolds) – 12:10 ^{[B]}
4. "Midnight Moonlight" (Peter Rowan) – 9:46 ^{[B]}

Disc 2

1. "How Sweet It Is (To Be Loved by You)" (Brian Holland, Lamont Dozier, Eddie Holland) – 9:42 ^{[C]}
2. "Friend of the Devil" (Garcia, John Dawson, Hunter) – 9:55 ^{[C]}
3. "Russian Lullaby" (Irving Berlin) – 12:30 ^{[A]}
4. "Tore Up Over You" (Hank Ballard) – 13:08 ^{[A]}
5. "I'll Take a Melody" (Allen Toussaint) – 15:03 ^{[A]}

Disc 3

1. "After Midnight" (J. J. Cale) – 12:25 ^{[A]}
2. "Stir It Up" (Bob Marley) – 9:20 ^{[A]}
3. "Mystery Train" (Junior Parker, Sam Phillips) – 9:46 ^{[C]}
4. "The Way You Do the Things You Do" (Smokey Robinson, Bobby Rogers) – 8:08 ^{[B]}
5. "Mighty High" (David Crawford, Richard Downing) – 8:42 ^{[D]}

Recording dates

[A] November 7, 1976 – Keystone, Berkeley, California
[B] November 12, 1976 – Freeborn Hall, University of California, Davis, Davis, California
[C] November 13, 1976 – East Gym, Humboldt State University, Arcata, California
[D] 1976, date and location unknown

== Personnel ==
Jerry Garcia Band

- Jerry Garcia – guitar, vocals
- Donna Jean Godchaux – backing vocals
- Keith Godchaux – keyboards
- John Kahn – bass
- Ron Tutt – drums

Production

- Produced by Marc Allan and Kevin Monty
- Recording: Betty Cantor-Jackson
- Mastering: Fred Kevorkian
- Design, illustration: Lawrence Azerrad
- Liner notes essay: Steve Parrish
- Photos: Richard Loren, Ed Perlstein
- Front cover artwork: Jerry Garcia
