= Heavy Turbulence =

Studio album by Merl Saunders
- Released: February 1972
- Recorded: Fall 1971
- Label: Fantasy
- Producer: Tom Fogerty; Merl Saunders; Brian Gardner

Merl Saunders chronology
Soul Grooving (1968)	Heavy Turbulence (1972)	Fire Up (1973)

Heavy Turbulence is an album by Merl Saunders. His second album, it was recorded in the fall of 1971, and released in February 1972.

In the early 1970s, Merl Saunders and Jerry Garcia sometimes performed concerts together at small venues in the San Francisco Bay Area. At the time, their band was Garcia's main musical outlet when the Grateful Dead were not on tour. Heavy Turbulence features their usual band lineup from 1971 – Saunders on keyboards and vocals, Garcia on lead guitar and vocals, Tom Fogerty on rhythm guitar, John Kahn on bass, and Bill Vitt on drums.

Saunders' next album, Fire Up, released in 1973, was recorded with the same group of musicians. All of the tracks from Heavy Turbulence and most of the tracks from Fire Up were re-released on the 1992 compilation album Fire Up Plus.

== Critical reception ==
Professional ratings
Review scores
Source	Rating
AllMusic	4/5 stars
The Encyclopedia of Popular Music	4/5 stars

On Allmusic, Eugene Chadbourne said "This is pretty much a straight rock and funk effort... Since [Fogerty] is such a terrific rhythm guitarist, it is really no surprise that he and Saunders could create such a pumping oil well; this is an album in which the rhythmic feel of each song can never be faulted, no matter how different the approaches might be. The band is really well recorded, the tones thick and fat, and the grooves trembling from the fine organ fondling.... Lead guitar fills by Jerry Garcia are a musical inspiration, as well as probably stimulating much of the original album's sales."

== Track listing ==
Side 1

1. "My Problems Got Problems" (Merl Saunders, Pamela Carrier) – 4:25
2. "The Night They Drove Old Dixie Down" (Robbie Robertson) – 4:00
3. "Save Mother Earth" (Saunders, Edmund Lewis) – 7:20
4. "Imagine" (John Lennon) – 2:35

Side 2

1. "Welcome to the Basement" (Saunders, Eddie Moore) – 6:12
2. "Man-Child" (Saunders, Lewis) – 12:35

== Personnel ==
Musicians

- Merl Saunders – keyboards, vocals
- Jerry Garcia – guitar, vocals
- Tom Fogerty – guitar, vocals
- John Kahn – bass
- Bill Vitt – drums
- The Hawkins Singers (Edwin, Walter, Tramaine, Lynette, Feddie, Carol) – vocals on "The Night They Drove Old Dixie Down", "Save Mother Earth", "Man-Child"
- Tower of Power – horns on "Welcome to the Basement", "Man-Child"
- Eddie Moore – drums on "Welcome to the Basement"
- Kenneth Nash – percussion on "Welcome to the Basement"
- Bob Drew – alto saxophone on "Welcome to the Basement"

Production

- Produced by Tom Fogerty with Merl Saunders and Brian Gardner
- Engineer: Brian Gardner
- Assistant engineer: Eddie Harris
