= Garcia Live Volume 15 =

GarciaLive Volume 15

Live album by Jerry Garcia and Merl Saunders
- Released: December 4, 2020
- Recorded: May 21, 1971
- Venues: Keystone Korner; San Francisco
- Genres: Rock, rhythm and blues
- Length: 118:18
- Label: ATO
- Producers: Marc Allan, Kevin Monty

Merl Saunders and Jerry Garcia chronology
Garcia Live Volume 12 (2019)	GarciaLive Volume 15 (2020)	Garcia Live Volume 18 (2022)

Jerry Garcia chronology
Garcia Live Volume 14 (2020)	Garcia Live Volume 15 (2020)	Garcia Live Volume 16 (2021)

GarciaLive Volume 15 is a two-CD live album by Jerry Garcia and Merl Saunders. It was recorded on May 21, 1971 at the Keystone Korner in San Francisco. It contains the complete concert from that date except for the encore, which was "Deal". It was released on December 4, 2020.

At this show, Garcia (guitar, vocals) and Saunders (keyboards, vocals) played as a trio with drummer Bill Vitt. Their usual bass player, John Kahn, was not present. Saxophonist Martin Fierro sat in on some songs. A few years later, Fierro would be a member of the Garcia / Saunders band called Legion of Mary.

== Critical reception ==
In Glide Magazine, Doug Collette wrote, "[The recording] derives from the early days of the longstanding collaboration between these two deeply kindred spirits and covers what is, in retrospect, very familiar stylistic ground in the nascent stages of exploration. Back cover disclaimer on audio quality aside, Fred Kevorkian's mastering of Jeff Ziegler's mix achieves the optimum combination of atmosphere and clarity... Garcia's work with Saunders allowed him extra freedom to stretch out in a more informal setting than with the Grateful Dead, the fruitful prospects for which were enhanced through the intimacy of a venue such as this two-hundred seat room. Accordingly, the ensemble artfully maintains a keen balance between restraint and expansion during the course of the largely instrumental, near-two hours total."

== Track listing ==
Disc one

First set:

1. "Man-Child" (Merl Saunders, Ed Lewis) – 17:16
2. "One Kind Favor" (Blind Lemon Jefferson) – 9:14
3. "I Know It's a Sin" (Jimmy Reed, Mary Reed) – 6:58
4. "I Was Made to Love Her" (Henry Cosby, Lula Mae Hardaway, Sylvia Moy, Stevie Wonder) – 9:58
5. "Keystone Korner Jam" (Jerry Garcia, Saunders, Bill Vitt, Martin Fierro) – 16:28
6. "The Night They Drove Old Dixie Down" (Robbie Robertson) – 5:04

Disc two

Second set:

1. "Save Mother Earth" (Saunders, Lewis) – 25:19
2. "That's All Right" (Jimmy Rogers) – 8:28
3. "The Wall Song" (David Crosby) – 12:45
4. "Mystery Train" (Junior Parker, Sam Phillips) – 6:44

== Personnel ==
Musicians

- Jerry Garcia – guitar, vocals
- Merl Saunders – keyboards, vocals
- Bill Vitt – drums
- Martin Fierro – saxophone on "I Was Made to Love Her", "Keystone Korner Jam", "Save Mother Earth", "That's All Right", "The Wall Song"

Production

- Produced by Marc Allan, Kevin Monty
- Project Coordination by Lauren Goetzinger
- Mixing: Jeff Zeigler
- Mastering: Fred Kevorkian
- Design, illustration: Ryan Corey
- Liner notes essay: Benjy Eisen
- Photos: Bob Gruen, Dr. Bob Marks, Brian McMillen, Roberto Rabanne
