= Garcia Live Volume 14 =

GarciaLive Volume 14

Live album by Jerry Garcia and John Kahn
- Released: July 24, 2020
- Recorded: January 27, 1986
- Venue: The Ritz; New York City
- Genre: Americana, folk
- Length: 70:38 (bonus disc: 73:10)
- Label: Round / ATO
- Producer: Marc Allan; Kevin Monty

Jerry Garcia chronology
Garcia Live Volume 13 (2020)	Garcia Live Volume 14 (2020)	Garcia Live Volume 15 (2020)

GarciaLive Volume 14 is an album by Jerry Garcia and John Kahn. It contains the complete concert recorded at The Ritz in Manhattan on January 27, 1986. It was released as a CD on July 24, 2020, and as a two-disc LP on August 14, 2020. Some copies of the CD include a bonus disc containing the complete concert recorded at the same venue on the following night.

In January and February 1986 Garcia and Kahn, long-time collaborators in the Jerry Garcia Band and other groups, performed a number of concerts as a duo. Garcia sang and played acoustic guitar and Kahn played double bass. Another album recorded on this concert tour is Pure Jerry: Marin Veterans Memorial Auditorium, San Rafael, California, February 28, 1986.

== Track listing ==
Garcia Live Volume 14 – recorded January 27, 1986

First set:

1. "Deep Elem Blues" (Joe Shelton, Robert Shelton) – 5:37
2. "Little Sadie" (traditional) – 4:31
3. "Friend of the Devil" (Jerry Garcia, Robert Hunter, John Dawson) – 6:25
4. "Oh Babe, It Ain't No Lie" (Elizabeth Cotten) – 5:26
5. "When I Paint My Masterpiece" (Bob Dylan) – 5:44
6. "Run for the Roses" (Garcia, Hunter) – 4:33

Second set:

7. "Dire Wolf" (Garcia Hunter) – 4:27
8. "Simple Twist of Fate" (Dylan) – 8:26
9. "Spike Driver Blues" (Mississippi John Hurt) – 4:10
10. "Bird Song" (Garcia, Hunter) – 9:14
11. "Ripple" (Garcia, Hunter) – 4:02

Encore:

12. "Goodnight Irene" (Huddie Ledbetter, John Lomax) – 7:45

Bonus disc – recorded January 28, 1986

First set:

1. "It Takes a Lot to Laugh, It Takes a Train to Cry" (Dylan) – 6:20
2. "Dire Wolf" (Garcia, Hunter) – 3:34
3. "I've Been All Around This World" (traditional) – 5:36
4. "Spike Driver Blues" (Hurt) – 5:26
5. "Jack-a-Roe" (traditional) – 4:22
6. "Run for the Roses" (Garcia, Hunter) – 4:35

Second set:

7. "Deep Elem Blues" (J. Shelton, R. Shelton) – 7:09
8. "Oh Babe, It Ain't No Lie" (Cotten) – 5:26
9. "Little Sadie" (traditional) – 5:32
10. "Gomorrah" (Garcia, Hunter) – 5:48
11. "Bird Song" (Garcia, Hunter) – 9:03
12. "Ripple" (Garcia, Hunter) – 4:10

Encore:

13. "Goodnight Irene" (Ledbetter, Lomax) – 5:56

== Personnel ==
Musicians

- Jerry Garcia – acoustic guitar, vocals
- John Kahn – double bass

Production

- Produced by Marc Allan, Kevin Monty
- Project Coordination by Lauren Goetzinger
- Mastering: Fred Kevorkian
- Design, illustration: Ryan Corey
- Liner notes essay: Billy Strings
- Photos: John Atashian, Robbi Cohn
