= Keystone Encores =

Live album by Merl Saunders, Jerry Garcia, John Kahn, Bill Vitt
- Released: March 1, 1988
- Recorded: July 10–11, 1973
- Genre: Rock
- Length: 55:24 (CD)
- Label: Fantasy
- Producers: Merl Saunders, John Kahn

Merl Saunders and Jerry Garcia chronology
Live at Keystone (1973)	Keystone Encores (1988)	Fire Up Plus (1992)

Merl Saunders chronology
Meridien Dreams (1987)	Keystone Encores (1988)	Blues from the Rainforest (1990)

Jerry Garcia chronology
Vintage NRPS (1986)	Keystone Encores (1988)	Almost Acoustic (1988)

Keystone Encores is an album by Merl Saunders, Jerry Garcia, John Kahn, and Bill Vitt. It was recorded live at the Keystone in Berkeley, California, on July 10 and 11, 1973, and released on CD by Fantasy Records in 1988. It was also released, with additional tracks, as two separate LPs called Keystone Encores Volume I and Keystone Encores Volume II.

Keystone Encores was the follow up to Live at Keystone, a two-disc LP released in 1973 containing songs from the July 10 and 11 concerts. These shows were among the many that Merl Saunders and Jerry Garcia played together from February 1971 to July 1975 when the Grateful Dead were not on tour. On these two nights, the lineup of the band was Saunders on keyboards, Garcia on guitar and vocals, John Kahn on bass, and Bill Vitt on drums.

== Critical reception ==
Professional ratings
Review scores
Source	Rating
Allmusic (Volume I)	4/5 stars
Allmusic (Volume II)	4/5 stars

Writing on Allmusic about Keystone Encores Volume I, Lindsay Planer said, "By mid-1973 the band was virtually a fixture at the Keystone and... their languid and unhurried style was the perfect blend of spontaneous improvisation and skilled musicianship. In particular, Garcia and Saunders carved out a fresh extension for Garcia to feed his insatiable love for jazz-flavored R&B. The combination of Saunders' sweet and soulful organ leads and Garcia's crystalline intonations are flawlessly supported by Kahn's assertive, yet elegant interjections."

Writing on Allmusic about Keystone Encores Volume II, Dave Connolly said, "Although Merl Saunders (who brought these recordings to light) gets top billing, the real attraction here is Jerry Garcia. Garcia's vocals and dexterous guitar playing shine, with Saunders' swirling organ lower in the mix. Bill Vitt (who had appeared with Saunders and Garcia on 1972's Heavy Turbulence) and John Kahn (then a member of Old & In the Way) are primarily here for support, laying down a foundation of drums and bass that never threatens to eclipse the two stars. The four songs featured here, all covers, are bluesy numbers peppered with the kind of country pickin' that the Grateful Dead covered on occasion, though without that band's intricate interplay."

== More Keystone albums ==
Live at Keystone is a two-disc LP released in 1973. It was the first album to contain songs recorded at the July 10 and 11, 1973 concerts at the Keystone in Berkeley. In 1988 it was re-released, with additional tracks, as two separate CDs — Live at Keystone Volume I and Live at Keystone Volume II.

Keystone Companions: The Complete 1973 Fantasy Recordings is a four-CD album released in 2012. It contains remastered versions of all the tracks from the Live at Keystone and Keystone Encores albums, plus seven previously unreleased tracks from the same dates. The songs on Keystone Companions are presented in the order they were performed in concert.

== Track listing ==
=== Keystone Encores CD ===
1. "Hi-Heel Sneakers" (Robert Higgenbotham) – 8:12
2. "It's Too Late (She's Gone)" (Chuck Willis) – 7:44
3. "I Second That Emotion" (Smokey Robinson, Al Cleveland) – 10:57
4. "One Kind Favor" (Blind Lemon Jefferson) – 6:36
5. "Money Honey" (Jesse Stone) – 8:19
6. "How Sweet It Is" (Brian Holland, Lamont Dozier, Eddie Holland) – 10:20

=== Keystone Encores Volume I LP ===
Side 1

1. "I Second That Emotion" (Robinson, Cleveland) – 10:57
2. "One Kind Favor" (Jefferson) – 6:36

Side 2

1. "Money Honey" (Stone) – 8:19
2. "Merl's Tune" (Merl Saunders, John White) – 13:35 – LP-only track

=== Keystone Encores Volume II LP ===
Side 1

1. "Hi-Heel Sneakers" (Higgenbotham) – 8:12
2. "Mystery Train" (Sam Phillips, Junior Parker) – 11:32 – LP-only track

Side 2

1. "It's Too Late (She's Gone)" (Willis) – 7:44
2. "How Sweet It Is" (Holland, Dozier, Holland) – 10:20

== Personnel ==
=== Musicians ===
- Merl Saunders – keyboards
- Jerry Garcia – guitar, vocals
- John Kahn – bass
- Bill Vitt – drums

=== Production ===
- Produced by Merl Saunders, John Kahn
- Recording: Betty Cantor, Rex Jackson
- Engineering: Danny Kopelson
- Mastering: George Horn
- Photography: Annie Leibovitz, Phil Bray
