= Garcia Live Volume Nine =

Live album by Jerry Garcia and Merl Saunders
- Released: July 28, 2017
- Recorded: August 11, 1974
- Venues: The Keystone; Berkeley, California
- Genres: Rock, rhythm and blues
- Length: 117:27
- Label: ATO
- Producers: Marc Allan, Kevin Monty

Merl Saunders and Jerry Garcia chronology
Garcia Live Volume Six (2016)	Garcia Live Volume Nine (2017)	Garcia Live Volume 12 (2019)

Jerry Garcia chronology
Garcia Live Volume Eight (2017)	Garcia Live Volume Nine (2017)	Garcia Live Volume 10 (2018)

Garcia Live Volume Nine is a two-CD live album by Jerry Garcia and Merl Saunders. It contains the complete concert recorded on August 11, 1974 at the Keystone in Berkeley, California. It was released on July 28, 2017.

The musical lineup for this concert was Garcia on guitar and vocals, Saunders on keyboards and vocals, Martin Fierro on saxophone and flute, John Kahn on bass, and Bill Kreutzmann on drums. A slightly later version of this band, with a different drummer, was called Legion of Mary.

== Critical reception ==
On AllMusic, Timothy Monger wrote, "Captured in the period between the release of the Grateful Dead's From the Mars Hotel LP and their touring hiatus that began in late 1974, this lively set from Jerry Garcia and longtime collaborator Merl Saunders has a comfortable, spontaneous ease to it.... By this point, the Saunders-Garcia partnership was already well established and their preferred venue, Keystone Berkeley, provided a relaxed space to try out the various facets of their funk, rock, and R&B repertoire.... The highlights, though, are in the extended jams, particularly the 19-minute "The Harder They Come", which feels like a dynamic zenith of this set."

On Grateful Web, Dylan Muhlberg said, "GarciaLive Volume Nine: August 11, 1974, Keystone Berkeley is like nothing you've heard previously from the Jerry Garcia catalog. It's remarkable how the supple drumming of Bill Kreutzmann varies the groove entirely, compared to Garcia's previous collaborator Bill Vitt and future associate Ron Tutt... Fans of Jerry Garcia need to get their hands on this release... This is like nothing you've ever heard before, with crystal-clear transfer. You'll be taken from your living room back to the intimate confines of the Keystone, Berkeley, for a night of infinite possibilities."

On Glide Magazine, Doug Collette wrote, "The nine selections of Volume Nine in this archival series well illustrate how a setlist can oftentimes barely scratch the surface of what went on below and beyond the songs documented in a given night’s performance.... Precursor to the band eventually dubbed Legion of Mary that coalesced later this same year, this quintet displays the same predilection to dig deeply into a groove, the depth of which recordist Betty Cantor-Jackson captures with her usual impeccable clarity (and which Fred Kevorkian preserves with his equally reliable mastering)."

== Track listing ==
Disc 1

First set:

1. "That's What Love Will Make You Do" (Henderson Thigpen, James Banks, Eddy Marion) – 13:14
2. "La La" (Martin Fierro) – 17:06
3. "It Ain't No Use" (Jerry Williams, Gary Bonds, Don Hollinger) – 10:57
4. "Mystery Train" (Junior Parker, Sam Phillips) – 13:33

Disc 2

Second set:

1. "The Harder They Come" (Jimmy Cliff) – 19:10
2. "Ain't No Woman (Like the One I've Got)" (Dennis Lambert, Brian Potter) – 17:01
3. "It's Too Late" (Chuck Willis) – 9:06
4. "(I'm a) Road Runner" (Brian Holland, Lamont Dozier, Eddie Holland) – 10:43
5. "The Night They Drove Old Dixie Down" (Robbie Robertson) – 6:34

== Personnel ==
Musicians

- Jerry Garcia – guitar, vocals
- Merl Saunders – keyboards, vocals
- Martin Fierro – flute, saxophone
- John Kahn – bass
- Bill Kreutzmann – drums

Production

- Produced by: Marc Allan, Kevin Monty
- Original recordings produced by: Jerry Garcia
- Recording: Betty Cantor-Jackson
- Mastering: Fred Kevorkian
- Art direction, design, illustration: Ryan Corey
- Liner notes essay: Merl Saunders, Jr.
- Photos: Larry Hulst, Roberto Rabanne
- Project coordination: Lauren Goetzinger
