= Fire Up (album) =

Studio album by Merl Saunders
- Released: May 1973
- Length: 39:42
- Label: Fantasy
- Producer: Merl Saunders

Merl Saunders chronology
Heavy Turbulence (1972)	Fire Up (1973)	Live at Keystone (1973)

Fire Up is an album by Merl Saunders. It was released in May 1973 through Fantasy Records. The self-produced album features many high-profile collaborators, including Grateful Dead members Jerry Garcia and Bill Kreutzmann alongside Creedence Clearwater Revival guitarist Tom Fogerty. It peaked at number 197 on the Billboard 200 albums chart.

Six of the album's eight tracks were included on the compilation Fire Up Plus in 1992.

== Background ==
Despite meeting resistance from his label over the album's lyrical content, Garcia encouraged Saunders to write the way he wanted:

Jerry always encouraged me to write material for the group. Fantasy was saying stuff like, 'the music is great, but these words about ecology and whatnot, you gotta tone 'em down.' I said, 'I like the words.' And Jerry's attitude was, 'Yeah, fuck 'em! Do what you want, Merl!' He was really my inspiration to do things the way I wanted to do them.

== Reception ==
In a retrospective review for AllMusic, Eugene Chadbourne stated the album "emphasizes [Saunders'] clever songwriting", listing "Soul Roach" and "Chock-Lite Pudding" as highlights.

== Track listing ==
Side one
No.	Title	Writer(s)	Length
1.	"After Midnight"	J.J. Cale	4:56
2.	"Expressway (To Your Heart)"	Leon Huff; Kenny Gamble	5:20
3.	"Charisma (She's Got)"	Merl Saunders	4:47
4.	"Soul Roach"	Saunders; Ray Shanklin	4:24

Side two
No.	Title	Writer(s)	Length
1.	"Chock-lite Puddin'"	Saunders	4:35
2.	"Benedict Rides"	Saunders; Pamela Carrier	3:02
3.	"The System"	Saunders; Carrier	3:48
4.	"Lonely Avenue"	Doc Pomus	8:50
Total length:			39:42

== Personnel ==
- Merl Saunders – electric piano, organ, ARP (flute), ARP (band), clavinet
- Jerry Garcia – guitar, vocals
- Tom Fogerty – rhythm guitar
- John Kahn – bass
- Bill Vitt – drums
- Gaylord Birch – congas, drums, tambourine
- Chuck Rainey – bass
- Walter Hawkins and sisters (Tramaine, Lynette, and Freddie) – background vocals
- Mike Howell – guitar, rhythm guitar
- Ken Nash – percussion
- Christopher Parker – drums
- Bill Somers – percussion
- Bill Kreutzmann – drums
