= Garcia Live Volume 11 =

Live album by Jerry Garcia Band
- Released: July 12, 2019
- Recorded: November 11, 1993
- Venue: Providence Civic Center; Providence, Rhode Island
- Genre: Rock, rhythm and blues
- Length: 131:35
- Label: Round / ATO
- Producer: Marc Allan, Kevin Monty

Jerry Garcia Band chronology
Electric on the Eel (2019)	Garcia Live Volume 11 (2019)	Garcia Live Volume 13 (2020)

Jerry Garcia chronology
Electric on the Eel (2019)	Garcia Live Volume 11 (2019)	Garcia Live Volume 12 (2019)

Garcia Live Volume 11 is a two-CD live album by the Jerry Garcia Band. It contains the complete concert recorded on November 11, 1993 at the Providence Civic Center in Providence, Rhode Island. It was released on July 12, 2019.

This show was part of what turned out to be the last East Coast tour by the Jerry Garcia Band. The album marks the first release of a Garcia Band concert recorded after 1991. It features the band's long-running musical lineup of Jerry Garcia (guitar, vocals), Melvin Seals (keyboards), John Kahn (bass), David Kemper (drums), Jaclyn LaBranch (vocals), and Gloria Jones (vocals).

== Critical reception ==
In Relix, Larson Sutton wrote, "The 11th in the Garcia Live series, it's no accident that this 11/11/93 ripper from Providence was chosen to be next, beyond the numeric synchronicity.... First and foremost is Jerry Garcia’s inspired voice and guitar work that proves once again why he was so beloved.... The two-disc collection is recorded quite well, balancing sonically and with strong fidelity each stellar contribution from the always-steady ensemble..."

In Glide Magazine, Doug Collette said, "Opening to rapturous audience acclaim, the penultimate cut, "Don't Let Go", is one of six cuts out of thirteen in double-figure duration on Garcia Live Volume 11, further illustrating why the moniker of this unit was the 'Jerry Garcia Band': every member plays his role to the hilt, not just the man from whom the name derives."

In Grateful Web, Dylan Muhlberg wrote, "1993 was indeed a year which saw [Garcia] reinvigorated, playing with focus and dynamics.... Garcia and the group played their heart out every time he visited Providence. We are grateful to have the crisp restoration of the entire evening’s performance accompanied by an engaging essay by Blair Jackson."

== Track listing ==
Disc 1

First set:

1. "Cats Under the Stars" (Jerry Garcia, Robert Hunter) – 9:42
2. "Mission in the Rain" (Garcia, Hunter) – 9:13
3. "That's What Love Will Make You Do" (Henderson Thigpen, James Banks, Eddy Marion) – 10:01
4. "Simple Twist of Fate" (Bob Dylan) – 13:42
5. "Ain't No Bread in the Breadbox" (Norton Buffalo) – 9:49
6. "My Sisters and Brothers" (Charles Johnson) – 4:09
7. "Deal" (Garcia, Hunter) – 9:24

Disc 2

Second set:

1. "The Way You Do the Things You Do" (Smokey Robinson, Bobby Rogers) – 15:48
2. "He Ain't Give You None" (Van Morrison) – 10:13
3. "Dear Prudence" (John Lennon, Paul McCartney) – 11:38
4. "The Hunter Gets Captured by the Game" (Robinson) – 8:37
5. "Don't Let Go" (Jesse Stone) – 13:00
6. "Midnight Moonlight" (Peter Rowan) – 6:15

== Personnel ==
Jerry Garcia Band

- Jerry Garcia – guitar, vocals
- Melvin Seals – keyboards
- John Kahn – bass
- David Kemper – drums
- Jaclyn LaBranch – vocals
- Gloria Jones – vocals

Production

- Produced for release by Marc Allan and Kevin Monty
- Project Coordination by Lauren Goetzinger
- Recording: John Cutler
- Mastering: Fred Kevorkian
- Design, illustration: Ryan Corey
- Liner notes essay "Cats on the Bandstand": Blair Jackson
- Photos: James R. Anderson, Bob Minkin, Joe Ryan
