= Fire Up =

Fire Up may refer to:

- Fire Up (album), by Merl Saunders featuring Jerry Garcia and Tom Fogerty (1973)
- Fire Up (TV series), Singaporean Chinese drama (2016)
