= Garcia Live Volume 16 =

Live album by Jerry Garcia Band
- Released: June 25, 2021
- Recorded: November 15, 1991
- Venue: Madison Square Garden
- Genre: Rock, rhythm and blues
- Length: 154:11
- Label: Round / ATO
- Producer: Marc Allan; Kevin Monty

Jerry Garcia Band chronology
Garcia Live Volume 13 (2020)	Garcia Live Volume 16 (2021)	Garcia Live Volume 17 (2021)

Jerry Garcia chronology
Garcia Live Volume 15 (2020)	Garcia Live Volume 16 (2021)	Garcia Live Volume 17 (2021)

Garcia Live Volume 16 is a three-CD album by the Jerry Garcia Band. It contains the complete concert recorded on November 15, 1991, at Madison Square Garden in New York City. It was released on June 25, 2021.

This show was the Jerry Garcia Band's first appearance at Madison Square Garden. It featured their 1986 to 1993 lineup of Jerry Garcia on guitar and vocals, Melvin Seals on keyboards, John Kahn on bass, David Kemper on drums, and Jaclyn LaBranch and Gloria Jones on backing vocals.

== Critical reception ==
In Glide Magazine Doug Collette wrote, "Garcia Live Volume 16 may be the ideal entry in this ongoing archive series to provide the curious music lover eager to comprehend the virtues of the Jerry Garcia Band.... [Garcia] is equally expressive through the selection of tunes by his favorite composers plus an eclectic range of other song choices, consistently vigorous vocals... and, last but not least, versatile and inventive guitar work."

== Track listing ==
Disc one

First set:

1. "How Sweet It Is (To Be Loved by You)" (Brian Holland, Eddie Holland, Lamont Dozier) – 7:41
2. "Struggling Man" (Jimmy Cliff) – 7:18
3. "He Ain't Give You None" (Van Morrison) – 8:31
4. "Simple Twist of Fate" (Bob Dylan) – 13:42
5. "Lay Down Sally" (Eric Clapton, Marcy Levy, George Terry) – 10:01

Disc two

1. "The Night They Drove Old Dixie Down" (Robbie Robertson) – 9:44
2. "My Sisters and Brothers" (Charles Johnson) – 4:36
3. "Deal" (Jerry Garcia, Robert Hunter) – 9:02

Second set:

4. "The Way You Do the Things You Do" (Smokey Robinson, Bobby Rogers) – 14:10
5. "Waiting for a Miracle" (Bruce Cockburn) – 6:15
6. "Shining Star" (Paul Richmond, Leo Graham) – 11:25
7. "Ain't No Bread in the Breadbox" (Norton Buffalo) – 9:54

Disc three

1. "Don't Let Go" (Jesse Stone) – 15:46
2. "That Lucky Old Sun" (Haven Gillespie, Beasley Smith) – 12:29
3. "Bright Side of the Road" (Van Morrison) – 5:58

Encore:

4. "What a Wonderful World" (George Weiss, Bob Thiele) – 8:17

== Personnel ==
Jerry Garcia Band

- Jerry Garcia – guitar, vocals
- Melvin Seals – keyboards
- John Kahn – bass
- David Kemper – drums
- Jaclyn LaBranch – vocals
- Gloria Jones – vocals

Production

- Produced by Marc Allan and Kevin Monty
- Recording: John Cutler
- Mastering: Fred Kevorkian
- Project coordinator: Lauren Goetzinger
- Design, illustration: Lawrence Azerrad
- Liner notes essay: Dean Budnick
- Photos: John Atashian, Bob Minkin
- Front cover artwork: Jerry Garcia
