= Garcia Live Volume 13 =

Live album by Jerry Garcia Band
- Released: April 24, 2020
- Recorded: September 16, 1989
- Venue: Poplar Creek Music Theatre
- Genre: Rock, rhythm and blues
- Length: 132:15
- Label: Round / ATO
- Producer: Marc Allan, Kevin Monty

Jerry Garcia Band chronology
Garcia Live Volume 11 (2019)	Garcia Live Volume 13 (2020)	Garcia Live Volume 16 (2021)

Jerry Garcia chronology
Bear's Sonic Journals: Dawn of the New Riders of the Purple Sage (2020)	Garcia Live Volume 13 (2020)	Garcia Live Volume 14 (2020)

Garcia Live Volume 13 is a two-CD live album by the Jerry Garcia Band. It contains the complete concert recorded on September 16, 1989 at Poplar Creek Music Theatre in Hoffman Estates, Illinois. It was released on April 24, 2020.

At this concert Clarence Clemons of Bruce Springsteen's E Street Band played saxophone for the entire show.

== September 1989 tour ==
In September 1989 the Jerry Garcia Band played a 12-concert tour of the Northeast and Midwest. Garcia Live Volume 13 is a recording of the last show of this tour. At five of the concerts, including this one, Clarence Clemons sat in on tenor saxophone. The opening act at all the shows was Bob Weir and Rob Wasserman.

== Critical reception ==
In Glide Magazine, Doug Collette wrote, "Everyone involved is deeply engaged, energetic and enthusiastic, so the playing transcends the ostensible familiarity of this setlist. And, as essayist Blair Jackson also points out in [the album liner notes], Clemons' pedigreed playing moves Garcia to stretch himself, not just through his impassioned guitar or his singing... but quite probably in song choice as well."

== Track listing ==
Disc 1

First set:

1. "Cats Under the Stars" (Jerry Garcia, Robert Hunter) – 9:32
2. "They Love Each Other" (Garcia, Hunter) – 8:26
3. "Let It Rock" (Chuck Berry) – 9:00
4. "I Shall Be Released" (Bob Dylan) – 9:54
5. "Someday Baby" (Lightnin' Hopkins) – 8:17
6. "Dear Prudence" (John Lennon, Paul McCartney) – 11:06
7. "Let's Spend the Night Together" (Mick Jagger, Keith Richards) – 10:40

Disc 2

Second set:

1. "How Sweet It Is (To Be Loved by You)" (Brian Holland, Lamont Dozier, Eddie Holland) – 7:56
2. "Knockin' on Heaven's Door" (Dylan) – 11:45
3. "Think" (Jimmy McCracklin, Deadric Malone) – 9:45
4. "Waiting for a Miracle" (Bruce Cockburn) – 7:03
5. "Evangeline" (David Hidalgo, Louie Pérez) – 5:51
6. "The Night They Drove Old Dixie Down" (Robbie Robertson) – 10:34
7. "Tangled Up in Blue" (Dylan) – 12:22

== Personnel ==
Jerry Garcia Band

- Jerry Garcia – guitar, vocals
- Melvin Seals – keyboards
- John Kahn – bass
- David Kemper – drums
- Jaclyn LaBranch – vocals
- Gloria Jones – vocals

Additional musicians

- Clarence Clemons – saxophone

Production

- Produced by Marc Allan, Kevin Monty
- Project Coordination by Lauren Goetzinger
- Recording: John Cutler
- Mastering: Fred Kevorkian
- Design, illustration: Ryan Corey
- Liner notes essay: Blair Jackson
- Photos: Bob Minkin
