= Garcia Live Volume 10 =

Live album by Jerry Garcia Band
- Released: February 23, 2018
- Recorded: May 20, 1990
- Venue: Hilo Civic Auditorium; Hilo, Hawaii
- Genre: Rock, rhythm and blues
- Length: 136:52
- Label: Round
- Producer: Marc Allan; Kevin Monty

Jerry Garcia Band chronology
Garcia Live Volume Eight (2017)	Garcia Live Volume 10 (2018)	Electric on the Eel (2019)

Jerry Garcia chronology
Garcia Live Volume Nine (2017)	Garcia Live Volume 10 (2018)	Before the Dead (2018)

Garcia Live Volume 10 is a two-CD live album by the Jerry Garcia Band. It contains the complete concert recorded on May 20, 1990 at the Hilo Civic Auditorium in Hilo, Hawaii. It was released on February 23, 2018.

From February 1986 to November 1993, the lineup of the Jerry Garcia Band was Jerry Garcia (guitar, lead vocals), Melvin Seals (keyboards), John Kahn (bass), David Kemper (drums), Jaclyn LaBranch (backing vocals), and Gloria Jones (backing vocals).

== Critical reception ==
On AllMusic, Timothy Monger said, "... this May 20, 1990 show held at the Hilo Civic Auditorium was a benefit for the Ocean Recreational Council of Hawaii.... the show offers some JGB standards like the Marvin Gaye classic "How Sweet It Is (To Be Loved by You)" and the Hunter-Garcia tune "They Love Each Other" alongside reggae covers by Peter Tosh and Jimmy Cliff. Some additional contemporary covers also graced this set, like Los Lobos' "Evangeline" and Bruce Cockburn's "Waiting for a Miracle", as well as a unique cover of the Dylan/Band classic "Tears of Rage".

== Track listing ==
Disc 1

First set:

1. "How Sweet It Is (To Be Loved by You)" (Lamont Dozier, Brian Holland, Eddie Holland) – 6:20
2. "They Love Each Other" (Jerry Garcia, Robert Hunter) – 7:09
3. "Tough Mama" (Bob Dylan) – 5:16
4. "Like a Road Leading Home" (Don Nix, Dan Penn) – 8:14
5. "Run for the Roses" (Garcia, Hunter) – 5:39
6. "The Way You Do the Things You Do" (Smokey Robinson, Bobby Rogers) – 10:06
7. "My Sisters and Brothers" (Charles Johnson) – 4:13
8. "Knockin' on Heaven's Door" (Dylan) – 10:07
9. "Deal" (Garcia, Hunter) – 8:21

Disc 2

Second set:

1. "The Harder They Come" (Jimmy Cliff) – 10:55
2. "Forever Young" (Dylan) – 8:24
3. "Stop That Train" (Peter Tosh) – 7:10
4. "Tore Up over You" (Hank Ballard) – 7:24
5. "Tears of Rage" (Dylan, Richard Manuel) – 7:47
6. "Evangeline" (David Hidalgo, Louie Pérez) – 4:01
7. "Waiting for a Miracle" (Bruce Cockburn) – 6:19
8. "That Lucky Old Sun" (Haven Gillespie, Beasley Smith) – 9:37
9. "Tangled Up in Blue" (Dylan) – 9:40

== Personnel ==
Jerry Garcia Band

- Jerry Garcia – guitar, vocals
- Gloria Jones – vocals
- John Kahn – bass
- David Kemper – drums
- Jaclyn LaBranch – vocals
- Melvin Seals – keyboards

Production

- Produced for release by Marc Allan, Kevin Monty
- Original recordings produced by Jerry Garcia
- Recording: John Cutler
- Mastering: Fred Kevorkian
- Design and illustration: Ryan Corey
- Liner notes: Dennis McNally
- Photos: Bill Smythe
- Project coordination: Lauren Goetzinger

== Charts ==
Chart (2018)	Peak position
US Billboard 200	153
