= Positively 4th Street =

Song written and composed by Bob Dylan

- US picture sleeve

Single by Bob Dylan
- B-side: "From a Buick 6"
- Released: September 7, 1965
- Recorded: July 29, 1965
- Genre: Folk rock; pop
- Length: 3:54
- Label: Columbia (43389)
- Songwriter: Bob Dylan
- Producer: Bob Johnston

Bob Dylan singles chronology
"Like a Rolling Stone" (1965)	"Positively 4th Street" (1965)	"Can You Please Crawl Out Your Window?" (1965)

"Positively 4th Street" is a song written and performed by Bob Dylan, first recorded in New York City on July 29, 1965. It was released as a single by Columbia Records on September 7, 1965, reaching No. 1 on Canada's RPM chart, No. 7 on the U.S. Billboard Hot 100, and No. 8 on the UK Singles Chart. Rolling Stone magazine ranked the song as No. 203 in their 500 Greatest Songs of All Time list.

The song was released between Highway 61 Revisited and Blonde on Blonde, as the follow-up to Dylan's hit single "Like a Rolling Stone", but was not included on either album. The song's title does not appear anywhere in the lyrics. There has been much debate over the years regarding the significance and whereabouts of the 4th Street mentioned in the title, and which person or group is addressed in the song.

An unreleased promo spot of the song can be found on the No Direction Home DVD special features.

== Recording sessions and release ==
The master take of "Positively 4th Street" was recorded on July 29, 1965, during the mid-June to early August recording sessions that produced all of the material that appeared on Dylan's 1965 album, Highway 61 Revisited. The song was the last to be attempted that day, with Dylan and a variety of session musicians having already successfully recorded master takes of "It Takes a Lot to Laugh, It Takes a Train to Cry" and "Tombstone Blues". The studio band on "Positively 4th Street" featured Bobby Gregg (drums), Russ Savakus (bass), Frank Owens (piano), Al Kooper (organ) and Mike Bloomfield (guitar), with the song initially being logged on the studio's official recording session documentation under the working title of "Black Dally Rue".

Although the song was recorded during the Highway 61 Revisited sessions, and shares much stylistically with the tracks on that album, it was saved for a single-only release, eventually charting in the top ten on both sides of the Atlantic. 17,000 early copies of the "Positively 4th Street" single were mis-pressed, with an outtake version of "Can You Please Crawl Out Your Window?" (a song that Dylan later released as his next single) appearing on the A-side in place of "Positively 4th Street". Critic Dave Marsh praised the song as "an icy hipster bitch session" with "Dylan cutting loose his barbed-wire tongue at somebody luckless enough to have crossed the path of his desires." The song was later included on the U.S. version of Bob Dylan's Greatest Hits, as well as the compilation albums Masterpieces, Biograph, and The Essential Bob Dylan. It also was used in director Todd Haynes's 2007 film I'm Not There.

Joni Mitchell has cited the song as one of her biggest inspirations at the dawn of her career: "There came a point when I heard a Dylan song called 'Positively Fourth Street' and I thought 'oh my God, you can write about anything in songs'. It was like a revelation to me".

In 1989, a Bristol music promoter purchased an old KB Discomatic jukebox that had once belonged to John Lennon during the mid-1960s. A copy of Dylan's "Positively 4th Street" single was found among the 41 7" singles loaded onto the machine. As a result, the song appears on the John Lennon's Jukebox compilation album, which was released to coincide with the publicity surrounding the jukebox's unveiling and a South Bank Show documentary about the jukebox.

== Musical structure and lyrics ==
"Positively 4th Street" sample

The song, like most of Dylan's, is composed of a simple harmonic, or chordal, and melodic structure; the verse has a I-ii-IV-I progression followed by I-V-IV-vi-V. The song is in the key of F# Major.

While the lyrics are distinctly negative, the organ-dominated backing music is that of carefree folk-rock. The melody is somewhat repetitive and does not deviate from the harmonic progression set up during the first four lines of the song. Additionally, the song has no recognizable, repeating refrain, and does not feature its title anywhere in the song's lyrics.

Dylan begins by telling the unspecified target of the song that they have a lot of nerve to say that they are his friend and then goes on to list a multitude of examples of their backstabbing duplicity. Paul Williams, the founder of Crawdaddy! magazine, noted that the song's lyrics are uncharacteristically straightforward and devoid of the poetic imagery present in the majority of Dylan's contemporaneous material. Thus, the song can be seen as an open letter to Dylan's intended target, with the Top 40 airwaves serving as Dylan's means of communication.

The lyrics are bitter and derisive, which caused many, at the time of the song's release, to draw a comparison with Dylan's similarly toned previous single "Like a Rolling Stone". Indeed, journalist Andy Gill described it as "simply the second wind of a one-sided argument, so closely did it follow its predecessor's formula, both musically and attitudinally". Robert Christgau called the song "righteously nasty".

Cash Box described it as a "throbbingly bittersweet funky affair in which Dylan attacks those people who wouldn’t accept him when he was an unknown."

== Inspiration and the significance of 4th Street ==
There is uncertainty about which "4th Street" the title refers to, and many scholars and fans have speculated that it refers to more than one. New York City's 4th Street is at the heart of the Manhattan residential district Greenwich Village, where Dylan once lived. This area was central to the burgeoning folk music scene of the early 1960s, which centered around Dylan and many other influential singer-songwriters. For example, Gerde's Folk City was originally located at 11 West 4th Street. However, the song also may concern Dylan's stay at the University of Minnesota in Minneapolis, where 4th Street S.E. is one of the two main roads crossing through the part of campus known as Dinkytown, where Dylan lived and performed.

The song is generally assumed to ridicule Greenwich Village residents who criticized Dylan for his departure from traditional folk styles towards the electric guitar and rock music. Many of the Greenwich Village folk crowd, who had been good friends of Dylan's, took offense and assumed that the song carried personal references. Noted Village figure Izzy Young, who ran the Folklore Center, had this to say of the accusation:

At least five hundred came into my place [the Folklore Center] ...and asked if it was about me. I don't know if it was, but it was unfair. I'm in the Village twenty-five years now. I was one of the representatives of the Village, there is such a thing as the Village. Dave Van Ronk was still in the Village. Dylan comes in and takes from us, uses my resources, then he leaves and he gets bitter. He writes a bitter song. He was the one who left.

Other possible targets of the song's derision include Irwin Silber, editor of Sing Out! magazine and a critic of Dylan's move away from traditional folk styles, and Tom Paxton, who had criticized the emerging folk rock scene of the period in a Sing Out! magazine article titled "Folk Rot" (although Dylan wrote and recorded "Positively 4th Street" months before the "Folk Rot" article was published in January 1966).

In the book Dylan: Visions, Portraits, and Back Pages, compiled by the writers of the UK's Mojo magazine, there is some speculation that "Positively 4th Street", like other Dylan compositions of the time, was influenced by Dylan's experimentation with LSD. The book alleges that Dylan's feeling was that "LSD is not for groovy people: it's for mad, hateful people who want revenge." This allegation is supported by the derisive, attacking tone of many of the songs on Bringing It All Back Home and Highway 61 Revisited, as well as the harsh and powerful textures of Dylan's electric sound.

== Certifications ==
Certifications for "Positively 4th Street"
Region	Certification	Certified units/sales
United States (RIAA)	Gold	500,000^{‡}
^{‡} Sales+streaming figures based on certification alone.

== Cover versions ==
Living Voices were the first to cover the song in 1966, on their Positively 4th Street and Other Message Folk Songs LP.

Johnny Rivers recorded the song, using it as the closing track on his Realization album in 1968. Dylan said in his best-selling book Chronicles: Volume One that he preferred Johnny Rivers' version of "Positively 4th Street" to his own recording of the song. "Positively 4th Street" was also rehearsed by the Beatles during the Let It Be recording sessions, but they never recorded a complete version of the song.

In 1970, the Byrds included a live version of the song, recorded at the Felt Forum, on their (Untitled) album. The Jerry Garcia Band also covered the song in their live shows and a live recording appears on The Very Best of Jerry Garcia compilation album. A Merl Saunders and Garcia live performance at the Keystone in Berkeley, California, in July 1973 was included in Live at Keystone in 1973 and re-released in September of 2012 as a part of Keystone Companions: The Complete 1973 Fantasy Recordings. The punk band X released a version of "Positively 4th Street" on their "4th of July" single in 1987. Antiseen also covered this song on their 1989 LP, Noise for the Sake of Noise.

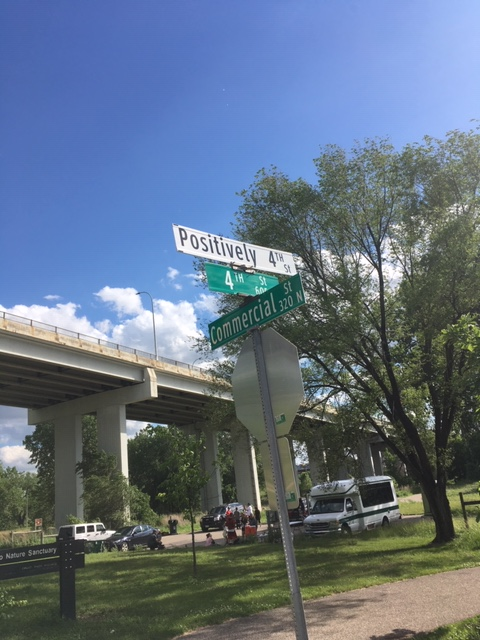
Street sign commemorating the song in St Paul, Minnesota

Other musicians and bands that have covered the song, include Lucinda Williams, on the live compilation album In Their Own Words, Vol. 1, Charly García on his 1995 album Estaba en llamas cuando me acosté, the Stereophonics on their 1999 EP, Pick a Part That's New, the Violent Femmes on their 2000 album, Freak Magnet, and Simply Red on their 2003 album, Home.

Larry Norman released a version of "Positively 4th Street" (with slightly altered lyrics) on the 2003 album Rock, Scissors et Papier and Bryan Ferry covered the song on his 2007 album, Dylanesque. A recording of the song by Steve Wynn appeared on the 2009 album, Steve Sings Bob.

== Other uses ==
David Hajdu used the title of the song in the title of his 2002 book, Positively 4th Street: The Lives and Times of Joan Baez, Bob Dylan, Mimi Baez Fariña and Richard Fariña.

On July 22, 2015, the St. Paul, Minnesota, city council renamed a street near CHS Field "Positively 4th Street" after the song.

Comedian Jimmy Fallon performed a parody version of the song in 2016 with the lyrics replaced by those of Drake’s "Hotline Bling".

== See also ==
- The Music Inn, a store at 169 4th Street at which Dylan was a customer
