= David Gans (musician) =

American singer-songwriter

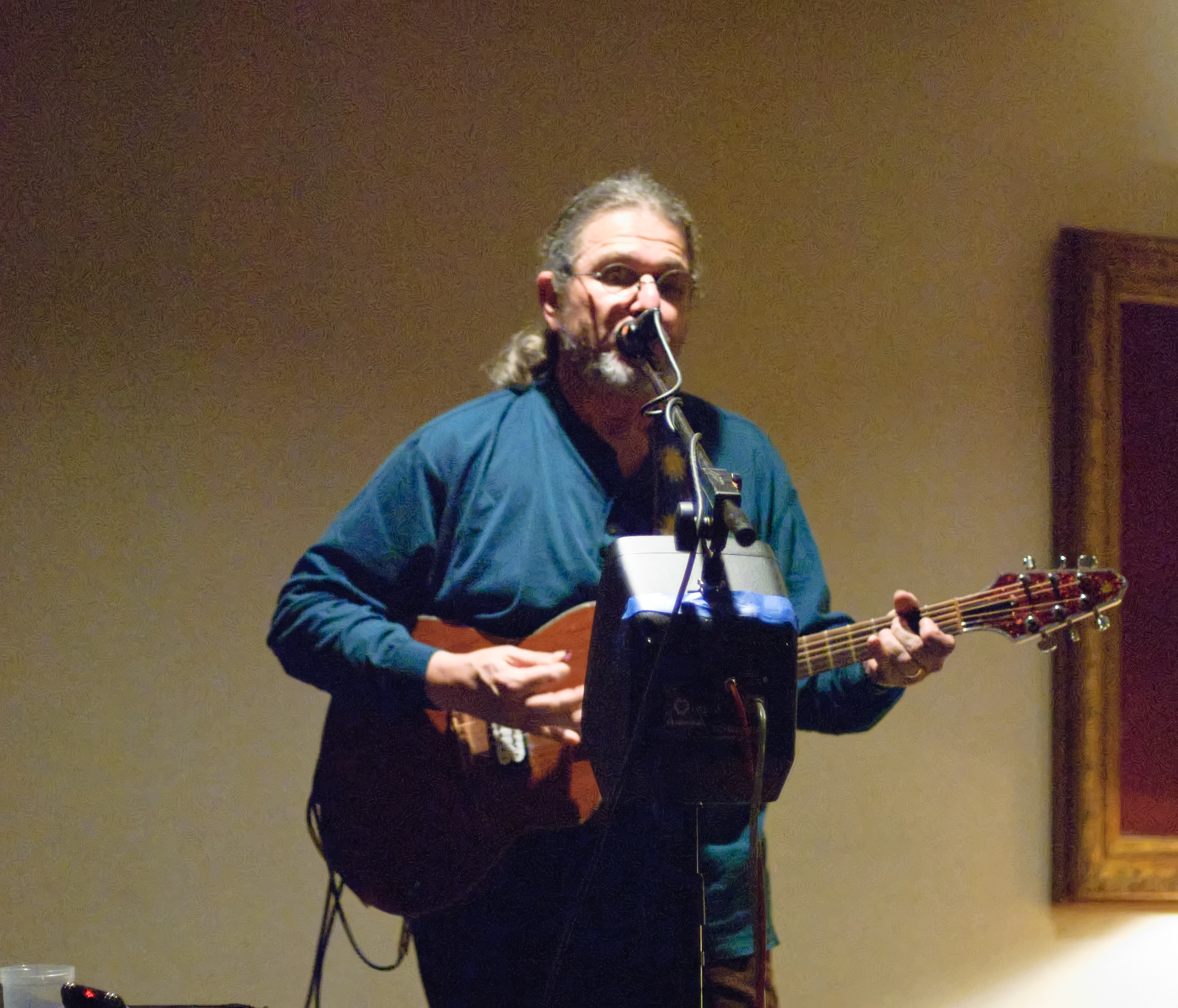
- David Gans in 2009

Background information
- Born: October 29, 1953 (age 73); Los Angeles, California, United States
- Genres: Rock; Folk; Jam band
- Occupations: Musician; Songwriter; Music journalist; Author
- Instruments: Vocals; Guitar
- Years active: 1970–present
- Labels: Shanachie; Arista; Perfectible Recordings
- Website: David Gans official website

David Gans (born October 29, 1953) is an American musician, songwriter, and music journalist. He is a guitarist, and is known for incisive, literate songwriting. He is also noted for his music loop work, often creating spontaneous compositions in performance. He is the co-author of the book Playing in the Band: An Oral and Visual Portrait of the Grateful Dead, and the host of the weekly syndicated radio show The Grateful Dead Hour. He currently co-hosts a radio show with Gary Lambert on Sirius XM's The Grateful Dead Channel called Tales from the Golden Road, a call-in show about the Grateful Dead.

== Biography ==
=== Journalism ===
Born in Los Angeles, California, Gans started out as a musician in 1970, playing guitar and writing songs and performing both as a soloist and as a member of various bands around the San Francisco Bay Area. Then, in an unusual career change, he became a music journalist. Gans' journalism career was quite successful, writing for BAM, a free San Francisco-based magazine, and Jann Wenner's Record from its beginning to its end, and working as music editor of Mix magazine for a while. He wrote articles for prominent magazines such as Relix and Rolling Stone. He commented, "Writing for music magazines gave me access to musicians and producers and record company publicists. I got a million-dollar education from interviewing Leo Fender, Randy Newman, Fleetwood Mac, Steve Goodman, T Bone Burnett, Warren Zevon, Ted Templeman, and people like that. I spent time in recording studios, learned how the music business operates, rode in limos with the Doobie Brothers, got lots of records for free, and got paid for all of it."

In 1985, his first book, Playing in the Band: an Oral and Visual Portrait of the Grateful Dead (co-authored with Peter Simon) about his long-time favorites, the Grateful Dead, was published to critical acclaim. Nicholas Meriweather noted that "Playing in the Band introduced thousands of fans to the deeper history of the band and scene, at a time when good books on the band were a rarity"

Four of Gans' photos appear in the book Eyes of the World (Jay Blakesberg-Josh Baron), published in 2017.

=== Broadcast ===
While promoting his first book on the Grateful Dead, Playing in the Band, Gans found himself in the studios of KFOG radio in San Francisco. He soon found himself producing pieces for the station, which led to his being offered the opportunity to host "The Grateful Dead Hour.", originally titled "The Deadhead Hour". The program was syndicated on dozens of stations across the United States. Gans has added Tales from the Golden Road on Sirius/XM Satellite Radio with co-host Gary Lambert, editor of The Grateful Dead Almanac; and the local weekly show, Dead to the World, on Berkeley's KPFA to his oeuvre of media work.

Gans is credited by many for encouraging Grateful Dead bassist Phil Lesh to emerge from retirement. Lesh played several shows with David Gans and the Broken Angels in late 1997 and early 1998. Gans assembled interesting combinations of musicians for Lesh to jam with in a series of benefits for Lesh's Unbroken Chain Foundation, culminating with a sold-out show at the Fillmore Auditorium in San Francisco on January 31, 1998. Shortly after that event, Lesh began assembling ensembles of his own and touring as Phil Lesh and Friends.

=== Music ===
Gans describes his career in musical journalism as "getting 'sidetracked'" from his first love: actually making music. In the mid-1990s, with the death of Jerry Garcia and the Grateful Dead's subsequent extended hiatus, Gans decided to set journalism on the back-burner and focus on music again.

In 1997, he released a duet album of himself playing with Berkeley singer-songwriter Eric Rawlins, Home By Morning, backing it up by performing around the Bay Area. This was followed the next year by a topical single, "Monica Lewinsky," that got a lot of airplay and publicity and enabled Gans to expand his touring base. After more than twenty years of performing in the Bay Area as a solo singer-songwriter and with various bands (The Reptiles, Crazy Fingers, David Gans and the Broken Angels), Gans began touring nationally, which he continues to do today. He performs at many festivals including the Gathering of the Vibes, the High Sierra Music Festival, MagnoliaFest and the Suwannee SpringFest (both held annually at the Spirit of the Suwannee Music Park), Grateful Fest (in Nelson Ledges Quarry Park, Ohio), the Master Musicians Festival (in Somerset, Kentucky); the Terrapin Hill Music Festival (in Harrodsburg, Kentucky), Hookahville (in Ohio), the Sunshine Daydream Music Festival (in Terra Alta, West Virginia), the Berkeley (California) Free Folk Festival, and others. He has appeared in concert all over the country, from Seattle to Atlanta, Burlington to Phoenix.

In 2002, Gans became one of the first independent musicians to release a DVD. Live at the Powerhouse documents an outdoor afternoon performance at a northern California brewpub, demonstrating his work multi-tracking himself live, using a Boss RC-20 Loop Station.

He has performed onstage with members of the Grateful Dead, The Schwag, JGB, the New Riders of the Purple Sage, Donna the Buffalo, Peter Rowan, Ollabelle, The Waybacks, Blueground Undergrass, Dark Star Orchestra, Keller Williams, moe., Hot Buttered Rum, the Rowan Brothers, and Henry Kaiser.

From 2012 to 2015, Gans led Sycamore Slough String Band, an acoustic band playing the music of the Grateful Dead. The band featured a variety of special guest from the Grateful Dead family of musicians including Mark Karan, Jason Crosby, Henry Kaiser, James Nash and Sunshine Becker. The band performed live throughout Northern California and toured the East Coast.

== Discography ==
=== Musician ===
- Home By Morning, David Gans and Eric Rawlins. Perfectible Recordings, 1997.
- "Monica Lewinsky", David Gans and the Broken Angels (CD single). Perfectible Recordings, 1998.
- Solo Acoustic, David Gans. Perfectible Recordings, 2001.
- Live at the Powerhouse, David Gans. PowerVision DVD, 2003.
- Solo Electric, David Gans. Perfectible Recordings, 2003.
- Twisted Love Songs, David Gans. Perfectible Recordings, 2007.
- The Ones That Look The Weirdest Taste The Best, David Gans. Perfectible Recordings, 2008.
- Life Is a Jam, David Gans. Perfectible Recordings, 2010
- First Rehearsals, Sycamore Slough String Band. Perfectible Recordings, 2012.
- It's a Hand-Me-Down, David Gans. Perfectible Recordings, 2015.
- You Are Here, David Gans. Perfectible Recordings, 2015.
- Just Watching The Show, Joe Burke & The Watery Parts. Perfectible Recordings, 2017.
- Chocolate Coffee Pot, David Gans. Perfectible Recordings, 2016
- Drop the Bone, David Gans. Perfectible Recordings, 2017.
- Drop The Bone (Bonus Disc), David Gans. Perfectible Recordings, 2017

=== Producer ===
- Various artists, The Music Never Stopped: Roots of the Grateful Dead. Co-produced with Henry Kaiser. Shanachie Records, 1995.
- Grateful Dead, So Many Roads (1965–1995) (5-CD boxed set). Co-produced with Steve Silberman and Blair Jackson; Arista, 1999. RIAA certified gold.
- The Persuasions, Might as Well: The Persuasions Sing Grateful Dead. Co-produced with Jerry Lawson. Grateful Dead/Arista Records, 1999.
- Various artists, Stolen Roses: Songs of the Grateful Dead. Grateful Dead/Arista Records, 1999.
- Grateful Dead, Postcards of the Hanging: Grateful Dead Perform the Songs of Bob Dylan. Grateful Dead/Arista Records, 2002.
- Grateful Dead, Best of the Grateful Dead Hour. Grateful Dead Records, 1998.
- Jerry Garcia, All Good Things: Jerry Garcia Studio Sessions. Co-produced with Blair Jackson. Rhino Records, 2004.
- Joe Burke & The Watery Parts, Just Watching the Show. Perfectible Recordings, 2017.

=== Liner notes ===
- David Murray Octet: Dark Star: Music of the Grateful Dead. Astor Place Records.
- Grateful Dead, American Beauty. Individually and as part of the boxed set of The Golden Road (1965-1973). Rhino Records, 2002
- Grateful Dead, Terrapin Station. Part of the Beyond Description (1973–1989) boxed set. Rhino Records, 2004.
- Jerry Garcia Band, "Let It Rock" aka The Jerry Garcia Collection, Vol. 2: Jerry Garcia Band, Keystone Berkeley '75. Jerry Garcia Family LLC, 2009.
- Merl Saunders, Jerry Garcia: Keystone Companions: The Complete 1973 Fantasy Recordings. Fantasy Records, 2012.

=== Consultant ===
- Anthem to Beauty DVD

== Bibliography ==
- Playing in the Band: An Oral and Visual Portrait of the Grateful Dead by David Gans and Peter Simon. St Martin's Press, 1985; revised edition published by St. Martin's Press 1996.
- Talking Heads: The Band and Their Music. Avon Books, 1985. Out of print.
- Not Fade Away: The Online World Remembers Jerry Garcia. David Gans, editor. Thunder's Mouth Press, 1995.
- Conversations with the Dead: The Grateful Dead Interview Book. Citadel Underground, 1991. Expanded edition published by Da Capo Press 2002.
- This Is All a Dream We Dreamed: An Oral History of the Grateful Dead. Flatiron Books, 2015.
