= Gaylord Birch =

American drummer (1946–1996)

Gaylord G. Birch (March 10, 1946 – April 14, 1996) was an American drummer for the bands Santana, Graham Central Station, Cold Blood, Pointer Sisters and Herbie Hancock.

== History ==
Birch was the drummer for the Pointer Sisters during 1974 and performed many live performances with the group. Birch also appeared in the band Santana during 1976 and again in 1991, as well as playing the drums for a number of Herbie Hancock performances. In 1979, he joined Merl Saunders & Jerry Garcia in Reconstruction, a band which also included Ed Neumeister (trombone), Ron Stallings (tenor sax & vocals) and John Kahn (bass). Reconstruction existed from January through August 1979 and played over 60 gigs, nearly all in the San Francisco Bay Area; dozens of these performances were recorded and circulate among aficionados. Birch also filled in as drummer with Jerry Garcia's band for three gigs in January 1975 and was their regular drummer from October 1985 through February 1986.

Birch also played drums briefly with Cold Blood, and is on the recordings Thriller! (1973) and Live at the Record Plant Sausalito, CA JUL 2, 1974. He played and recorded with Charles Brown in the 1980s. In the early 1970s Birch also played for Graham Central Station, Melissa Etheridge and recorded with Santana and Stevie Wonder. Birch also started his own band called the Birchworks, a local band that played in local clubs in the bay area and on occasion drummed with touring jazz acts. Birch was known as the go-to drummer whenever a recording or a band needed someone to fill in. He was one of the most versatile drummers around, playing any genre that was required of him. He was a very learned drummer.
