= Live at Keystone =

Live album by Merl Saunders, Jerry Garcia, John Kahn, Bill Vitt
- Released: 1973
- Recorded: July 10–11, 1973
- Venue: Keystone
- Genre: Rock
- Label: Fantasy
- Producers: Merl Saunders, Jerry Garcia, John Kahn, Bill Vitt

Merl Saunders and Jerry Garcia chronology
Live at Keystone (1973)	Keystone Encores (1988)

Merl Saunders chronology
Fire Up (1973)	Live at Keystone (1973)	Merl Saunders (1974)

Jerry Garcia chronology
Garcia (1972)	Live at Keystone (1973)	Garcia (1974)

Live at Keystone is an album by Merl Saunders, Jerry Garcia, John Kahn, and Bill Vitt. It was recorded live at the Keystone in Berkeley, California on July 10 and 11, 1973, and released later that year as a two-disc vinyl LP. It was re-released in 1988, with additional tracks, as two separate CDs, called Live at Keystone Volume I and Live at Keystone Volume II.

From February 1971 to July 1975, Merl Saunders and Jerry Garcia often played live shows together when the Grateful Dead were not on tour. For many of those concerts, their band had the lineup featured on this album – Saunders on keyboards, Garcia on guitar and vocals, John Kahn on bass, and Bill Vitt on drums. One track of Live at Keystone, "Positively 4th Street", also includes David Grisman on mandolin.

== Critical reception ==
Professional ratings
Review scores
Source	Rating
Allmusic	4/5 stars

On Allmusic, Lindsay Planer wrote, "... let the music speak for itself as Live at Keystone is chocked with inspired covers, each respectively extended and collectively improvised by co-instrumental leads Jerry Garcia (guitar/vocals) and Merl Saunders (organ) with Bill Vitt (drums) and John Kahn (bass). This was an ad-hoc configuration, as opposed to the organized touring unit that Garcia developed as the Jerry Garcia Band. From December of 1970 until the spring of 1974 — prior to the combo evolving into the Legion of Mary — the guitarist could often be found performing sporadically in and around San Francisco between engagements with the Grateful Dead. The quartet ably fuse rock with jazz in their spacy unfettered jams. These emerge from an eclectic composite of R&B and blues to seminal rock oldies and even popular standards."

== More Keystone albums ==
In 1988, Fantasy Records released two single-disc LPs with more music recorded at the shows of July 10 and 11, 1973 — Keystone Encores Volume I and Keystone Encores Volume II. They also released a single-disc CD, Keystone Encores, containing six of the eight tracks from the LPs.

In 2012, the label released a four-CD album called Keystone Companions: The Complete 1973 Fantasy Recordings. This contains remastered versions of all the tracks from the Live at Keystone and Keystone Encores albums, plus seven previously unreleased tracks from the same dates. (The track titled "Space" is a segment of "Merl's Tune", and so is included as part of the complete recording of that track.) The songs on Keystone Companions are presented in the order they were performed in concert.

== Track listing ==
=== Live at Keystone LP ===
Side 1

1. "Keepers" (Merl Saunders, John Kahn) – 6:38
2. "Positively 4th Street" (Bob Dylan) – 7:45
3. "The Harder They Come" (Jimmy Cliff) – 6:20

Side 2

1. "It Takes a Lot to Laugh, It Takes a Train to Cry" (Dylan) – 7:03
2. "Space" (Saunders, Jerry Garcia, Kahn, Bill Vitt) – 3:53
3. "It's No Use" (Jerry Williams, Gary Bonds, Don Hollinger) – 9:34 *

Side 3

1. "That's All Right, Mama" (Arthur Crudup) – 4:18
2. "My Funny Valentine" (Richard Rodgers, Lorenz Hart) – 18:06

Side 4

1. "Someday Baby" (Sam Hopkins) – 10:13
2. "Like a Road Leading Home" (Don Nix, Dan Penn) – 10:58

* In the album liner notes the song is credited to Gene Clark and Roger McGuinn, but they wrote a different song of the same name, which appears on the Byrds album Mr. Tambourine Man.

=== Live at Keystone Volume I CD ===
1. "Keepers" (Saunders, Kahn) – 6:38
2. "Positively 4th Street" (Dylan) – 7:45
3. "The Harder They Come" (Cliff) – 6:20
4. "It Takes a Lot to Laugh, It Takes a Train to Cry" (Dylan) – 7:03
5. "Space" (Saunders, Garcia, Kahn, Vitt) – 3:53
6. "It's No Use" (Williams, Bonds, Hollinger) – 9:34
7. "Merl's Tune" (Saunders, White) – 13:35 – CD bonus track

=== Live at Keystone Volume II CD ===
1. "That's All Right, Mama" (Crudup) – 4:18
2. "My Funny Valentine" (Rodgers, Hart) – 18:06
3. "Someday Baby" (Hopkins) – 10:13
4. "Like a Road Leading Home" (Nix, Penn) – 10:58
5. "Mystery Train" (Sam Phillips, Junior Parker) – 11:32 – CD bonus track

== Personnel ==
=== Musicians ===
- Merl Saunders – keyboards
- Jerry Garcia – guitar, vocals
- John Kahn – bass
- Bill Vitt – drums
- David Grisman – mandolin on "Positively 4th Street"

=== Production ===
- Produced by Merl Saunders, Jerry Garcia, John Kahn, Bill Vitt
- CD bonus tracks produced by Merl Saunders, John Kahn
- Recording: Betty Cantor, Rex Jackson
- Engineering: Danny Kopelson
- Mastering: George Horn
- Photography: Annie Leibovitz
- Design: Tony Lane
