= Merl Saunders =

American pianist and keyboardist (1934–2008)

- Born: Merl Washington; February 14, 1934; San Mateo, California, U.S.
- Died: October 24, 2008 (aged 74) San Francisco, California, U.S.
- Instruments: Hammond organ, piano
- Years active: 1960s–2006
- Formerly of: Dinosaurs, Legion of Mary, Saunders/Garcia Band, Rainforest Band

Merl Saunders (February 14, 1934 – October 24, 2008) was an American multi-genre musician who played piano and keyboards, favoring the Hammond B-3 console organ.

== Biography ==
Born in San Mateo, California, United States, Saunders attended Polytechnic High School in San Francisco. In his first band in high school was singer Johnny Mathis. He served in the U.S. Air Force from 1953 to 1957. He worked as musical director of the Billy Williams Revue and served in a similar capacity in Oscar Brown Jr.'s off-Broadway show, Big Time Buck White.

He gained notice in the 1970s when he began collaborating with Jerry Garcia, with whom he had begun playing in 1971 at a small Fillmore Street nightclub called The Matrix. He sat in with the Grateful Dead and co-founded the Saunders/Garcia Band which produced three albums and would become the band Legion of Mary, with the addition of Martin Fierro (saxophone), in 1974. It disbanded the following year; however, he and Garcia continued to collaborate in the band Reconstruction in 1979, with Ed Neumeister (trombone), Gaylord Birch (drums), and John Kahn (bass).

He led his own band as Merl Saunders and Friends, playing live dates with Garcia, as well as with Mike Bloomfield, David Grisman, Michael Hinton, Tom Fogerty, Vassar Clements, Kenneth Nash, John Kahn, and Sheila E. He also collaborated with Grateful Dead percussionist Mickey Hart in the band High Noon.

Saunders took the lead in reintroducing Jerry Garcia to his guitar, after Garcia suffered a diabetic coma in the summer of 1986.

In 1990, he released the world music and New Age classic album Blues From the Rainforest, a collaboration with Garcia and Muruga Booker. This led to the release of a video which chronicled Saunders' journey to the Amazon rainforest and the subsequent albums Fiesta Amazonica, It's in the Air, and Save the Planet so We'll have Someplace to Boogie. One of the songs from Blues from the Rainforest was used as part of the soundtrack for the TV series Baywatch. Saunders continued to perform with the Rainforest Band for the next ten years.

Saunders worked with musicians Paul Pena, Bonnie Raitt, Phish, Widespread Panic, Miles Davis, and B. B. King. He also recorded with the Dinosaurs, a "supergroup" of first-generation Bay Area rock musicians.

He had his own record label, Sumertone Records (named for his children Susan, Merl Jr., and Tony), and had also recorded on Fantasy Records, Galaxy Records, and Relix Records, as well as the Grateful Dead and Jerry Garcia labels. He worked with the Grateful Dead on the theme music for the 1985 TV show The Twilight Zone. As musical director he completed two-and-a-half seasons of the show. He also worked on the TV series Nash Bridges and on several soundtracks for movies, including Fritz the Cat and Steelyard Blues. He was production coordinator for the Grammy Awards for two years and for the Grammy's Greatest Moments TV special. He also supplied the music for the computer animation video Headcandy: Sidney's Psychedelic Adventure.

He worked with several charitable organizations such as the Seva Foundation, the Rex Foundation, the Rainforest Action Network, and the Haight-Ashbury Free Clinic, and headlined the Haight Street Music Fair for 24 consecutive years. He has been granted a Doctorate of Music by Unity College, in Unity, Maine.

In 2002, Saunders suffered from a stroke that paralyzed one side of his body and curtailed his musical career. He died in San Francisco, California, on the morning of October 24, 2008, after fighting infections as a result of complications related to the stroke. He was survived by his two sons, Tony Saunders (bassist) and Merl Saunders Jr. (a former senior executive director of National Academy of Recording Arts and Sciences), and his daughter Susan Mora.

In December 2008, TMZ reported that the estate of Merl Saunders had filed a lawsuit against the estate of Jerry Garcia, disputing royalties for a 2004 live album. Saunders' estate claimed they were not aware of the album's release and that they had equal rights to the royalties. The case was later settled amicably.

== Tributes ==
- On Saturday, February 14, 2009, a tribute to Merl Saunders' life and musical career was held at the Great American Music Hall in San Francisco. It featured actor/director Max Gail and Wavy Gravy as MCs, with many past musical collaborators including Grateful Dead guitarist Bob Weir, Tony Saunders, David Grisman, Michael Hinton, Melvin Seals, Michael Warren, Larry Vann, Tonedog, Misa Malone, and Bill Vitt, among others.
- A re-launch of the Rainforest Band as a tribute to Merl Saunders took place at the 29th Starwood Festival on July 25, 2009, the site of their last performance. The tribute featured his son Tony Saunders, Michael Hinton, Misa Malone, and other members of the Rainforest Band and of Saunders’ projects. Also appearing were Sikiru Adepoju on talking drum and Douglas "Val" Serrant on steel drum and djembe.

== Discography ==
=== Main studio, live, and compilation releases ===
- 1968: Soul Grooving – Merl Saunders Trio and Big Band
- 1972: Heavy Turbulence – with Jerry Garcia and Tom Fogerty
- 1973: Fire Up – with Jerry Garcia and Tom Fogerty
- 1973: Live at Keystone – with Jerry Garcia, John Kahn, and Bill Vitt
- 1974: Merl Saunders
- 1976: You Can Leave Your Hat On – with Aunt Monk
- 1979: Do I Move You
- 1982: San Francisco After Dark
- 1987: Meridien Dreams
- 1988: Keystone Encores – with Jerry Garcia, John Kahn, and Bill Vitt
- 1990: Blues From The Rainforest: A Musical Suite – featuring Muruga Booker, Shakti Booker, Eddie Moore, Joanie Lane (a.k.a. Jamie), special guest: Jerry Garcia
- 1991: Save The Planet So We'll Have Someplace To Boogie – Merl Saunders & the Rainforest Band
- 1992: Fire Up Plus – with Jerry Garcia, John Kahn, Tom Fogerty, and Ron Tutt
- 1993: It's In The Air – Merl Saunders & the Rainforest Band
- 1995: Still Having Fun
- 1997: Keepers – Merl Saunders and Friends
- 1998: Fiesta Amazonica – Merl Saunders & the Rainforest Band
- 1998: The Twilight Zone (Vol. 1): Original Soundtrack from the TV series – Grateful Dead and Merl Saunders
- 1998: Merl Saunders Live With His Funky Friends
- 2000: Struggling Man – Merl Saunders & His Funky Friends
- 2004: Still Groovin' – special guests Mavis Staples, Bonnie Raitt, David Grisman, and Huey Lewis. Produced by Tony Saunders
- 2004: Pure Jerry: Keystone Berkeley, September 1, 1974 – with Jerry Garcia
- 2005: Legion of Mary: The Jerry Garcia Collection, Vol. 1 – Legion of Mary with Jerry Garcia
- 2006: Live On Tour – Merl Saunders and Melvin Seals
- 2006: Well-Matched: The Best of Merl Saunders & Jerry Garcia
- 2012: Keystone Companions: The Complete 1973 Fantasy Recordings
- 2013: Garcia Live Volume Three – Legion of Mary with Jerry Garcia
- 2016: Garcia Live Volume Six – with Jerry Garcia
- 2017: Garcia Live Volume Nine – with Jerry Garcia
- 2019: Garcia Live Volume 12 – with Jerry Garcia
- 2020: Garcia Live Volume 15 – with Jerry Garcia
- 2022: Garcia Live Volume 18 – with Jerry Garcia
- 2026: Garcia Live Volume 22 – with Jerry Garcia

=== Solo or group, leader or co-leader – singles ===
- 1964: "Five More / How's That" (Fantasy 588)
- 1965: "High Heel Sneakers / Breakin' Thru" (Fantasy 600)
- 1966: "I Pity The Fool / Tighten Up" (Galaxy 747)
- 1967: "Soul Grooving / Up, Up and Away" (Galaxy 755)
- 1967: "Soul Roach, Pt. 1 & 2" (Early Bird 49659)
- 1969: "Julia / Five More" (Fantasy 620)
- 1969: "Mighty Whitey / Right On" (Sumertone 69)
- 1970: "Little Bit of Righteousness / The Iron Horse" (Galaxy 776) – with Heavy Turbulence
- 1971: "Save Mother Earth, Pt. 1 & 2" (Fantasy 668)
- 1972: "My Problems Got Problems / Welcome To The Basement" (Fantasy 678)
- 1981: "San Francisco After Dark / Come To Me" (Sumertone 214)

=== Various artist compilations that include previously unreleased Merl Saunders music ===
- 1970: Belafonte By Request – Harry Belafonte
- 1972: Black Girl (Soundtrack) – various artists
- 1972: Fritz The Cat (Soundtrack) – various artists
- 1973: Heavy Traffic (Soundtrack) – various artists
- 1997: Fire On The Mountain: Reggae Celebrates The Grateful Dead Volume 2 – various artists
- 1999: The Third Annual Gathering on the Mountain – various artists
- 2000: Gathering On The Mountain: Live Part 2 – various artists
- 2000: Gathering On The Mountain: Live Part 3 – various artists
- 2000: Sharin' In The Groove – various artists
- 2001: Into The Music: Jam Band Vol. 1 – various artists

=== Various artist compilations that include previously released Merl Saunders tracks ===
- 1992: All Night Long They Play The Blues (The Galaxy Masters) – various artists
- 1993: Bad, Bad Whiskey (The Galaxy Masters) – various artists
- 1995: Jazz Collective – various artists
- 1995: Sense Of Direction – various artists
- 1996: Television's Greatest Hits, Vol. 6: Remote Control – various artists
- 1996: Fritz The Cat/Heavy Traffic (Soundtrack) – various artists
- 2004: Get Your Lie Straight: A Galaxy of Funky Soul – various artists

=== Playing contributions to other major albums with others ===
- 1971: Grateful Dead (Skull & Roses) – Grateful Dead
- 1971: Danny Cox – Danny Cox
- 1972: Tom Fogerty – Tom Fogerty
- 1972: Steelyard Blues (Soundtrack) – various artists
- 1972: Give It Up – Bonnie Raitt
- 1972: Europe '72 – Grateful Dead
- 1972: Excalibur – Tom Fogerty
- 1973: Oooh So Good 'n Blues – Taj Mahal
- 1973: Betty Davis – Betty Davis
- 1973: Moses – Jerry Hahn
- 1973: Brenda Patterson – Brenda Patterson
- 1974: Garcia – Jerry Garcia
- 1974: Mo' Roots – Taj Mahal
- 1975: Is Having A Wonderful Time – Geoff Muldaur
- 1975: Cesar 830 – Cesar Ascarrunz
- 1976: David Soul – David Soul
- 1978: Cats Under the Stars – Jerry Garcia Band
- 1982: Run for the Roses – Jerry Garcia
- 1984: Amagamalin Street – Robert Hunter
- 1988: Dinosaurs – Dinosaurs
- 1988: Nightfood – Brian Melvin
- 1994: Free Flight – Palomino Duck
- 1996: Life Is Like That – Jerry Miller
- 1997: DAVA – DAVA and The Peace Army
- 1998: Ticket To Fly – Mike Lawson (Recorded in '94, released on Sumertone Records; Lawson was the only other artist on Merl's label)
- 2000: King Of The Highway – Norton Buffalo and The Knockouts
- 2000: New Train – Paul Pena
- 2000: Hoy Yen Ass'n – Tommy Guerrero and Gadget
- 2001: The Golden Road (1965-1973) – Grateful Dead
- 2001: Gifts From The Dead – various artists
- 2002: Remedy – Jim Weider Band
- 2002: Rare – Five Point Plan

=== Playing contributions to singles with others ===
- 1972: "Lady Of Fatima / Cast The First Stone" – Tom Fogerty (Fantasy 680)
- 1972: "Faces Places People / Forty Years" – Tom Fogerty (Fantasy 691)
- 1972: "Drive Again (Theme from Steelyard Blues) / Swing With It" – Nick Gravenites, Mike Bloomfield (Warner Bros.)
- 1989: "Underground" (EP) – Mike Lawson (Psychotronic Records)

=== Playing contributions to compilations ===
- 1975: Sampler For Deadheads (#1 of 3) – Jerry Garcia / Robert Hunter
- 1975: Sampler For Deadheads (#2 of 3) – Old & In The Way / Keith and Donna Godchaux
- 1977: What A Long Strange Trip It's Been – Grateful Dead
- 1978: Grateful Dead Sampler – various artists
- 1978: Arista AOR Sampler – various artists
- 1985: The Relix Sampler – various artists
- 1998: Tom Fogerty/Excalibur – Tom Fogerty
- 1999: The Very Best Of Tom Fogerty – Tom Fogerty
- 2000: Furthur Most – various artists
- 2000: The Best Of David Soul – David Soul
- 2000: Anti Love: The Best Of Betty Davis – Betty Davis

=== Non-performing references on albums ===
- 1975: Keith & Donna – Keith and Donna Godchaux
- 1976: For Dead Heads – various artists
- 1998: Blue Light Rain – Jazz Is Dead

== Filmography ==
=== Movies / DVDs ===
- Fritz the Cat (1972)
- Black Girl (1972)
- Heavy Traffic (1973)
- Steelyard Blues (1973)
- Headcandy: Sidney's Psychedelic Adventure (Headcandy Productions, 1997)
- A Tribute to Jerry Garcia: Deadheads Festival Japan 1997 (Japanese Laser Disc, Video Super Rock series VPLR-70650, 1997)
- Blues from the Rainforest: A Musical Suite (Mobile Fidelity, 1999)
- The Grateful Dead: The End of the Road - The Final Tour '95 (Monterey Video, 2000)
- Diggers (2006)

=== Television ===
- 34th Annual Grammy Awards (TV Special) – production coordinator
- 35th Annual Grammy Awards (TV Special) – production coordinator
- Grammy's Greatest Moments (TV Special) – production coordinator
- Vietnam: A Television History (TV Series) – music performer (11 episodes, 1997)
- The American Experience – Music Performer (6 episodes, 1997–2005)
- The Twilight Zone 1985 (TV Series) – music performer, musical director, and composer for the new title theme (72 episodes, 1985–1989)
- Nash Bridges (TV series)
- Tales From The Crypt (TV series)
- Baywatch (TV series)
- Simon & Simon (TV series)

== Interview ==
- Digital Interviews: Merl Saunders

== See also ==
- Jerry Garcia
- Rainforest Band
- Tony Saunders

== Other sources ==
- Clark, John Jr. "Former Grateful Dead Keyboardist Merl Saunders Dies", Rolling Stone, October 24, 2008
- Selvin, Joel. "Star Keyboardist Merl Saunders Dies", San Francisco Chronicle, October 25, 2008
- Obituary by The Associated Press, published in the Chicago Tribune
- Merl Saunders at AllMusic
