= Lonely Avenue =

1956 single by Ray Charles

Single by Ray Charles

from the album Yes Indeed!
- B-side: "Leave My Woman Alone"
- Released: September 1956
- Recorded: May 16, 1956
- Genre: Rhythm and blues
- Length: 2:36
- Label: Atlantic 8025
- Songwriter: Doc Pomus
- Producers: Ahmet Ertegün, Jerry Wexler

Ray Charles singles chronology
"Hallelujah I Love Her So" (1956)	"Lonely Avenue" (1956)	"Ain't That Love" (1957)

"Lonely Avenue"

Song by Van Morrison

from the album Too Long in Exile
- Released: June 8, 1993
- Recorded: The Wool Hall Studios, Bath, England
- Genre: R&B, Rock
- Length: 6:24
- Label: Mercury, Polydor
- Songwriter: Doc Pomus
- Producer: Van Morrison

"Lonely Avenue" is a popular song written by Doc Pomus, that was a No. 6 rhythm and blues hit for Ray Charles in 1956 who featured it on his 1958 album, Yes Indeed!.

== Background ==
The song drew the attention of the music business to Doc Pomus, who had previously had little success as a songwriter.

== Covers ==
- The Animals covered it on the 1977 reunion album Before We Were So Rudely Interrupted.
- The Blues Band covered the song on the album Ready in 1980.
- Joe Cocker regularly performed the song during his live shows.
- The Crickets covered the song on the 1964 album California Sun / She Loves You and released it as a single from Liberty Records.
- Lee Dorsey covers this song on his 1982 compilation album All Ways Funky.
- Les Double Six recorded the song on their 1964 album, The Double Six of Paris Sing Ray Charles.
- The Everly Brothers covered the song on the album Beat & Soul released in 1965.
- Tav Falco's Panther Burns included a version of this song on their 1994 album, Deep in the Shadows.
- Ian Gillan and Roger Glover covered the song on the album Accidentally on Purpose in 1988. The track appeared on the soundtrack to the movie Rain Man.
- Jimi Hendrix recorded a version in 1969 which was released in 2010 on the compilation West Coast Seattle Boy.
- John Hermann of Widespread Panic covered the song on his 2001 album Smiling Assassin. The version features Widespread Panic front man John Bell.
- Colin James released the song on his 2006 album Colin James & The Little Big Band 3.
- Booker T. & the M.G.'s included an instrumental cover of the song on the 1962 album Green Onions.
- Pete Kember covered the song on his 1990 debut solo LP Spectrum.
- Diana Krall covered the song on the album Glad Rag Doll in 2012.
- The Ramsey Lewis Trio recorded this song on 1963 album Barefoot Sunday Blues. The melody is performed using cello pizzicato and voice by Eldee Young.
- Los Lobos covered it on Till the Night is Gone: A Tribute to Doc Pomus released March 28, 1995. It is also included in the 2000 Los Lobos box set El Cancionero Mas y Mas on Disc 3.
- Taj Mahal covered the song on the album Phantom Blues in 1996.
- Stephen Marley covered the song on his 2007 album Mind Control.
- Van Morrison covered this song on his 1993 album Too Long in Exile, and later included it in the 1994 double live album A Night in San Francisco as the first song in a medley that lasted just under 15 minutes. Biographer John Collis says: "The 15-minute sequence billed as 'Lonely Avenue/4 O'Clock in the Morning (Try for Sleep)', does indeed begin with the Pomus song and includes the Morrison blues in the title, but also wheels on Jimmy Witherspoon for his own medley and also throws in passing quotes from 'Be Bop a Lula', Sly Stone's 'Family Affair' (with Jonn Savannah contributing a falsetto) and Roy Orbison's 'Down the Line' among other references."
- Merl Saunders and Friends covered this song on the 1972 album Fire Up Plus.
- Stanley Turrentine performed an instrumental version on his 1968 album Common Touch.
- Roseanna Vitro included this song in her 1997 album, Catchin’ Some Rays: The Music of Ray Charles.
- Kurt Elling and his ensemble performed this song at Lincoln Center in New York in 2012.
- Edison Electric Band covered this song on their 1970 album Bless You Dr Woodward.
- James Booker covered the song on his 1982 album Classified.
- On April 18, 2011, musician Ben Waters released the album Boogie 4 Stu, a tribute to the late Rolling Stones pianist Ian Stewart, including a version of "Lonely Avenue".
- Jon Batiste covered this song on his 2025 album Big Money, featuring Randy Newman.
