= Danny Cox (musician) =

American musician (1943–2025)

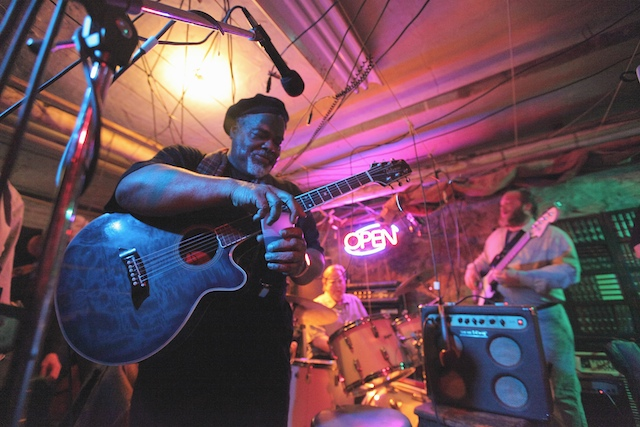

Background information
- Born: July 18, 1943; Cincinnati, Ohio, U.S.
- Died: March 7, 2025 (aged 81)
- Genres: Folk music, folk rock
- Occupation(s): Singer-songwriter, musician
- Instrument: Vocals

Daniel Cox Jr. (July 18, 1943 – March 7, 2025), also known as Sonny Cox, was an American folk singer and songwriter, best known for his 1974 LP album Feel So Good.

== Life and career ==
Danny Cox was born in Cincinnati, Ohio, United States to Bessy and Daniel Cox (Senior), as the sixth of seven children. As a youth, he sang in a church choir with Rudolph Isley. In the 1960s he started his professional career performing on a Hootenanny Folk Tour.

Cox recorded albums for ABC Dunhill, Casablanca, MGM, and others. He also recorded with recording/production company Good Karma Productions. Good Karma was run by Vanguard Coffee House (K.C.). Owner Stan Plesser managed Cox's career along with acts such as folk rock duo Brewer & Shipley, and the Southern rock band, The Ozark Mountain Daredevils.

Cox moved to Kansas City in 1967, where he continued his career and prospered both musically and personally.

On January 6, 2008, a fire destroyed his house and livelihood. Several benefit concerts were organized by local musicians, the last of which was "Raise the Roof" on September 25, 2010. With that, and a lot of help from extended family, Danny Cox was able to rebuild his home.

Cox later wrote jingles and worked with children's theaters.

In September 2011, Cox recorded Kansas City - Where I Belong at Pilgrim Chapel in Kansas City, Missouri. Produced by Dr. Roger Coleman, filmmaker Benjamin Meade, and musician Bob Walkenhorst, the CD (along with a short film entitled Up Close and Personal by Benjamin Meade) was released January 2012 by Pilgrim Chapel Music. Included are tracks that Cox wrote more than 30 years ago along with more recent material featuring his son Joseph. The package artwork features several drawings by Cox and was designed by Amy Young.

In 2012, Cox wrote the music, lyrics and starred in the show Fair Ball, a musical play about the dramatic history and courage of the men and women who played against all odds of racial segregation, including the "Jim Crow" laws, in the Negro leagues of baseball. The musical is a revision of The Monarchs of KC and includes new songs, characters, and true stories from a tumultuous and entertaining era of baseball history.

Cox died on March 7, 2025, at the age of 81.

== Discography ==
- At The Seven Cities (1963)
- Sunny (1968)
- Birth Announcement (1969)
- Live at the Family Dog (1970)
- Danny Cox (1971)
- Feel So Good (1974)
- Troost Avenue Blues (three tracks) (2006)
- Bring Our Loved Ones Back (one track) (2007)
- Kansas City - Where I Belong (2012)
