= Tommy Tucker (singer) =

American songwriter (1933–1982)

- Born: Robert Higginbotham; March 5, 1933; Springfield, Ohio, U.S.
- Died: January 22, 1982 (aged 48) Newark, New Jersey, U.S.
- Genre: Blues
- Occupations: Singer-songwriter; pianist
- Instrument: Piano

Tommy Tucker (born Robert Higginbotham; March 5, 1933 – January 22, 1982) was an American blues singer-songwriter and pianist. He is best known for the 1964 hit song, "Hi-Heel Sneakers", that went to No. 11 on the Billboard Hot 100 chart, and peaked at No. 23 in the UK singles chart.

== Early life ==
Tucker was born Robert Higginbotham, to Leroy and Mary Higginbotham, the fifth of eleven children, in Springfield, Ohio, United States.

== Career ==
Tucker released "Hi-Heel Sneakers" in 1964, which was a hit both in the US and the UK. He released an album, also entitled Hi-Heel Sneakers, on Checker Records that same year. His follow-up single, "Long Tall Shorty", was less successful. Musicians who played on his albums and singles included Louisiana Red, Willie Dixon and Donny Hathaway. In the 1970s, he began releasing previously unissued material on the English label Red Lightnin'. This was combined with his work for Big Bear Records, featuring on their American Blues Legends '75 album and tour.

Tucker co-wrote a song with Atlantic Records founder executive Ahmet Ertegun, called "My Girl (I Really Love Her So)". Tucker left the music industry in the late 1960s, taking a position as a real estate agent in New Jersey. He also did freelance writing for a local newspaper in East Orange, New Jersey, writing of the plight and ignorance of black males in America, and the gullibility and exploitation of African Americans in general by the white-dominated media.

== Death ==
Tucker died in 1982 at the age of 48 at College Hospital in Newark, New Jersey, from inhaling carbon tetrachloride while refinishing the hardwood floors of his home, though his death has been alternatively attributed to food poisoning.

== Discography ==
=== Singles ===
Year	Title	Label and Cat No
1961	"My Girl I Really Loved Her So" b/w "Rock and Roll Machine"	Atco 45-6208
1964	"Hi-Heel Sneakers" b/w "Don't Want 'Cha (Watcha Gonna Do)"	Checker 1067
1964	"Long Tall Shorty" b/w "Mo' Shorty"	Checker 1075
1965	"Alimony" b/w "All About Melanie"	Checker 1112
1966	"Chewin' Gum" b/w "I've Been a Fool"	Checker 1133
1966	"That's Life" b/w "That's How Much!"	Festival F-704
1967	"I'm Shorty" b/w "Sitting Home Alone"	Checker 1178
1967	"A Whole Lots of Fun (Before the Weekend is Done)" b/w "Real True Love (I Ain't Had None Lately)	Checker 1186

=== Albums ===
- 1964: Hi-Heel Sneakers (Checker)
- 1978: Live + Well (Ornament)
- 1978: Mother Tucker (Red Lightnin')
- 1982: The Rocks Is My Pillow - The Cold Ground Is My Bed (Red Lightnin')

=== Appears on ===
- 1975: American Blues Legends '75 (Big Bear)
