= Ed Neumeister =

American jazz musician (born 1952)

Ed Neumeister (born 1952) is a composer and jazz trombonist. He was born in Topeka, Kansas.

An early 2000s collaboration with Jay Clayton and Fritz Pauer was released as the album 3 for the Road. Around 2012, Neumeister took teaching posts at The New School, New York University, William Paterson University, Rutgers University, and City College of New York. Neumeister's solo trombone album, One and Only, contained recordings from 1994 and 2016. In 2019, Neumeister was part of Joe Lovano's Streams of Expressions band.
