= Kenneth Nash =

American psychiatrist

Kenneth C. Nash (born 1964) is an American psychiatrist and professor who is certified in child and adolescent psychiatry and psychiatry by the American Board of Psychiatry and Neurology. He practices at the University of Pittsburgh Physicians, Department of Psychiatry. He completed his fellowship and residency at the University of Pittsburgh School of Medicine and medical degree at the Louisville School of Medicine. He currently is the Vice Chair for Clinical Affairs at the University of Pittsburgh department of Psychiatry and the Chief of Clinical Services at UPMC Western Psychiatric Hospital.
