= It Takes a Lot to Laugh, It Takes a Train to Cry =

Song by Bob Dylan

from the album Highway 61 Revisited
- Released: August 30, 1965
- Recorded: July 29, 1965
- Studio: Columbia, New York City
- Genre: Blues rock
- Length: 3:25 (mono); 4:09 (stereo)
- Label: Columbia
- Songwriter: Bob Dylan

Audio sample
- file; help

"It Takes a Lot to Laugh, It Takes a Train to Cry" is a song written by Bob Dylan, that was originally released on his album Highway 61 Revisited. It was recorded on July 29, 1965. The song was also included on an early, European Dylan compilation album entitled Bob Dylan's Greatest Hits 2.

An earlier, alternate version of the song has been released, in different takes, beginning with the appearance of one take on The Bootleg Series Volumes 1–3 (Rare & Unreleased) 1961–1991 in 1991.

== Music and lyrics ==
The version of the song on Highway 61 Revisited is an acoustic/electric blues song, one of three blues songs on the album (the others being "From a Buick 6" and "Just Like Tom Thumb's Blues"). It is made up of lines taken from older blues songs combined with Dylan's own lyrics. Rather than the aggression of some of the other songs Dylan wrote during this time, "It Takes a Lot to Laugh, It Takes a Train to Cry" reflects world-weary resignation. The imagery is sexual, and the song can be interpreted as an allegory of someone who is sexually frustrated. Dylan would return to similar images and suggestions in later songs, such as "I Dreamed I Saw St. Augustine" and "Señor (Tales of Yankee Power)".

This version was recorded on July 29, 1965, the same day that Dylan also recorded "Positively 4th Street" and "Tombstone Blues". Musically, the song has a lazy tempo driven by lazy-slap drumming with a shuffling beat and slight emphasis on the offbeat from session drummer Bobby Gregg. There is also a barrelhouse piano part played by Paul Griffin, a raunchy bass part played by Harvey Brooks, an electric guitar part played by Mike Bloomfield and an unusual harmonica part.

An earlier version of the song went by the title "Phantom Engineer". This version has a more upbeat tempo and four lines of different lyrics. It was recorded on June 15, 1965, the same day that recording of "Like a Rolling Stone" began. Different takes of the June 15 version may be heard on The Bootleg Series Volumes 1–3 (Rare & Unreleased) 1961–1991, The Bootleg Series Vol. 7: No Direction Home, and the 2-disc version of The Bootleg Series Vol. 12: The Cutting Edge 1965–1966. Take 1 of the song, released on The Bootleg Series Vol. 12 and on Dylan's Vevo channel, is played in a more moderately paced, brooding arrangement, before Dylan and the musicians settled on a more upbeat version. On The Bootleg Series Vol. 7 and The Bootleg Series Vol. 12, the version is a speedy bouncing blues with a signature guitar riff being played on each bar and a fast clicking organ. (The 6-disc and 18-disc editions of The Bootleg Series Vol. 12 include outtakes from both the June 15 and July 29 sessions.)

== Live performances ==
The song's live debut came as part of Dylan's controversial electric set, backed by members of The Paul Butterfield Blues Band and Al Kooper, at the Newport Folk Festival on July 25, 1965, after "Maggie's Farm". After being heckled during the electric set, and especially during "It Takes a Lot to Laugh, It Takes a Train to Cry", by fans who wanted Dylan to play acoustic folk music, Dylan returned to play acoustic versions of "Mr. Tambourine Man" and "It's All Over Now, Baby Blue". The Newport performance of "It Takes a Lot to Laugh, It Takes a Train to Cry" features jamming by guitarist Bloomfield and organist Al Kooper. Kooper preferred the alternate version to the version that ended up on Highway 61 Revisited. The Newport performance was released in 2018 on Live 1962-1966: Rare Performances From The Copyright Collections.

Dylan played it live as part of his set in the August 1971 Concert for Bangladesh. This version was included in the concert film and Grammy Award-winning album of the same title.

A November 1975 performance of the song from Dylan's Rolling Thunder Revue tour was released on the 2002 album The Bootleg Series Vol. 5: Bob Dylan Live 1975, The Rolling Thunder Revue. In 2019, that performance and three other live renditions of the song from the same tour were released on the box set The Rolling Thunder Revue: The 1975 Live Recordings.

Dylan performed a jazz arrangement of the song backed by the Wynton Marsalis Septet at a concert in Lincoln Center in 2004. This acclaimed version eventually received an official release on the United We Swing compilation album in 2018.

According to his website, Dylan has played the song in concert over 200 times between 1965 and 2025.

== Legacy ==
Steely Dan borrowed a line from the song as the title of their debut album Can't Buy a Thrill (1972).

In a 2005 poll of artists reported in Mojo, "It Takes a Lot to Laugh, It Takes a Train to Cry" was listed at number 87 of the all time Bob Dylan songs.
