= Keystone (Berkeley, California) =

Music club in Berkeley, California, United States

Coordinates: 37.87245°N 122.26786°W

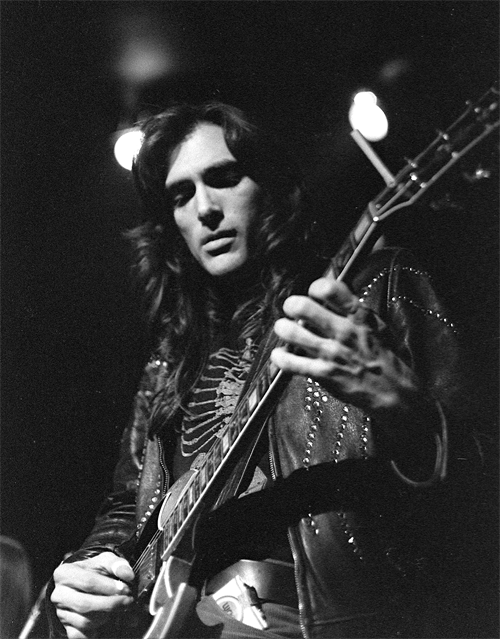
John Cipollina performing at Keystone, 1976

The Keystone, also known as Keystone Berkeley, was a small music club at 2119 University Avenue in Berkeley, California, which operated in the 1970s and 1980s. Numerous nationally known groups performed there, including Tom Petty and the Heartbreakers, Ray Charles, Talking Heads, The Ramones, Metallica and B.B King, Blondie, and Greg Kihn among many others and the club was a regular venue for the Jerry Garcia Band. Keystone Berkeley, run by Freddie Herrera and Bobby Corona, was linked to The Stone and Keystone Palo Alto.

== Berkeley ==
Keystone Korner's Freddie Herrera opened Keystone Berkeley, a larger venue, then sold the Keystone Korner to Todd Barkan The club was one of a group of important smaller clubs that bridged the transition from the 1960's counterculture to 1980's alternative rock. For example, while the Grateful Dead played venues like the Boston Garden, the Keystone was a "home away from home" for Jerry Garcia. Jerry Garcia is said to have played the Keystone Berkeley 206 times between 1972 and 1984, "a number that dwarfs any other venue he played at in any configuration." It also provided an early home for East Bay punk rock before Gilman Street or the Berkeley Square opened. Visiting post-punk, new wave and college rock bands, some of whom later became internationally famous, played early shows at the Keystone, including The Talking Heads, The Ramones, Tom Petty's first tour and two of R.E.M.'s first Bay Area dates. The Keystone Berkeley closed in 1984.

== Keystone Palo Alto ==
Keystone Palo Alto, at 260 California Avenue, opened 20 January 1977. The Keystone Palo Alto closed in 1986. The club became the Vortex in the mid-1980s, then The Edge in 1989, and closed in April 2000. It was remade into a restaurant, finally as Illusions, a restaurant and nightclub. The building was at various times during the last 50 years, a Purity Market, a Natural food store, a German restaurant, called the Zinzanatti Oom Pah Pah Lounge, a club called Sophies, it then was demolished in October 2013.

== Keystone Stockton ==
Keystone Stockton, in Stockton, California, was opened by March 10, 1974.

== The Stone ==
Herrera and Corona took over the lease in of a club at 412 Broadway in 1980 and began presenting the same eclectic mix of artists as an alternative to Bill Graham-run clubs. This version of the club was open until 1993.

The antecedents of the club include Marty Balin's Matrix at 3138 Fillmore Street, which closed in early 1971. Peter Abram, along with John Barsotti and Dave Martin, re-opened the club at 412 Broadway (previously Mr D's) in late summer 1973 but it was unsuccessful, only lasting three months. The New York Dolls played September 4–6. Bob Marley and The Wailers played October 29–30. Legend has it that on Halloween of 1973, Iggy and The Stooges, The Tubes and Sugardaddy played a wild show here, but this show seems to have actually taken place in January 1974 at another venue.

== Albums recorded at Keystone ==
By Jerry Garcia (and his various side projects)

- Live at Keystone
- Keystone Encores
- Keystone Companions: The Complete 1973 Fantasy Recordings
- Garcia Live Volume 9
- Pure Jerry: Keystone Berkeley
- Let It Rock: The Jerry Garcia Collection, Vol. 2
- Garcia Live Volume 5
- Garcia Live Volume 21

By Metallica

- Kill 'Em All (Deluxe Edition 2016)
