= Mystery Train =

1953 song by Junior Parker

Single by Little Junior's Blue Flames
- B-side: "Love My Baby"
- Released: November 1953
- Recorded: September–October 1953
- Studio: Memphis Recording Service, Memphis, Tennessee
- Genre: Blues; electric blues; Memphis blues
- Length: 2:20
- Label: Sun
- Songwriter: Junior Parker
- Producer: Sam Phillips

Official audio
- "Mystery Train" on YouTube

"Mystery Train" is a song written and recorded by American blues musician Junior Parker in 1953. Originally performed in the style of a Memphis blues or rhythm and blues tune, it was inspired by earlier songs and later became a popular rockabilly song, as first covered by Elvis Presley, then numerous others.

== Composition and recording ==
Music historian Colin Escott noted "One of the mysteries about 'Mystery Train' was where the title came from; it was mentioned nowhere in the song". The song uses lyrics similar to those found in the traditional American folk music group Carter Family's "Worried Man Blues", itself based on an old Celtic ballad, and their biggest selling record of 1930:

The train arrived sixteen coaches long
The train arrived sixteen coaches long
The girl I love is on that train and gone

Parker's lyrics include:

Train I ride sixteen coaches long
Train I ride sixteen coaches long
Well, that long black train carried my baby from home

Junior Parker, billed as "Little Junior's Blue Flames", recorded "Mystery Train" for producer and Sun Records owner Sam Phillips. The sessions took place at Phillips' Memphis Recording Service, in Memphis, Tennessee, during September and October 1953. Accompanying Parker on vocal is his backup band the "Blue Flames", whose members at the time are believed to have included: Floyd Murphy on guitar, William Johnson on piano, Kenneth Banks on bass, John Bowers on drums, and Raymond Hill on tenor sax.

"Mystery Train" was the follow-up single to Junior Parker's 1953 number five Billboard R&B chart release "Feelin' Good". The song did not reach the singles chart.

In 1973, with the approval of Sam Phillips, Robbie Robertson of the Band wrote additional lyrics for "Mystery Train", and the group recorded this version of the song for their Moondog Matinee album. They later performed the song with Paul Butterfield for their 1976 "farewell" concert The Last Waltz.

== Elvis Presley version ==
"Mystery Train"

Single by Elvis Presley
- A-side: "I Forgot to Remember to Forget"
- Released: August 20, 1955
- Recorded: July 11, 1955
- Studio: Memphis Recording Service, Memphis, Tennessee
- Genre: Rockabilly; rhythm and blues; rock and roll
- Length: 2:29
- Label: Sun
- Songwriters: Junior Parker; Sam Phillips
- Producer: Sam Phillips

Elvis Presley singles chronology
"Baby Let's Play House" (1955)	"Mystery Train" (1955)	"Heartbreak Hotel" (1956)

Elvis Presley's version of "Mystery Train" was first released on August 20, 1955, as the B-side of "I Forgot to Remember to Forget". In 2003, Rolling Stone magazine ranked it at number 77 on its list of the 500 Greatest Songs of All Time. Sam Phillips at Sun Studios again produced the recording, and featured Presley on vocals and rhythm guitar, Scotty Moore on lead guitar, and Bill Black on bass. Moore used a country lead break and fingerstyle picking, with a touch of slapback echo. Moore also drew on elements from earlier songs, such as the guitar riffs from Junior Parker's "Love My Baby" (1953), played by Pat Hare, and "Sixteen Tons" (1946) by Merle Travis.

Paired with "I Forgot to Remember to Forget", the single reached the Top 10 in Billboard's Country & Western listings.

RCA Victor re-released this recording in November 1955 (#47-6357) after acquiring it as part of a contract with Presley. This issue of the song peaked at number 11 on the national Billboard country chart. That same month, RCA Victor also released a pop version of the song by the Turtles (not to be confused with the 1960s pop group, the Turtles) with backing by Hugo Winterhalter and his Orchestra (47-6356).

"Mystery Train" is now considered to be an "enduring classic". It was the first recording to make Elvis Presley a nationally known country music star.

== See also ==
- List of train songs
