= John Kahn =

American electric and acoustic bassist

- Born: June 13, 1947; Memphis, Tennessee, U.S.
- Origin: Beverly Hills, California
- Died: May 30, 1996 (aged 48) Mill Valley, California, U.S.
- Genres: Rock
- Instruments: Bass guitar, Double bass
- Years active: Late 1960s – 1996
- Formerly of: Jerry Garcia Band; Legion of Mary; Old & In the Way; Reconstruction

John Kahn (June 13, 1947 – May 30, 1996) was an American bassist. From 1970 to 1995, Kahn was Jerry Garcia's principal musical collaborator outside of the Grateful Dead.

== Biography ==
John Kahn was born in Memphis, Tennessee. Adopted at birth by Hollywood talent agents, he grew up in Beverly Hills, California, and was babysat by Marilyn Monroe, who was represented by his father in the early stages of her career. According to spouse Linda Kahn in a 2017 Reddit Ask Me Anything prompt, he began to take piano and music theory classes at 4 and 5, respectively. Following the death of his father at a young age, he was mentored by Mischa Elman, a cousin of his father.

At Beverly Hills High School, he earned a reputation as a talented jazz guitarist. He also composed a symphonic piece, "Western Impressions," the first orchestral work by a student to be publicly performed by the school's orchestra (under the direction of Robert Holmes). In his junior year, Kahn switched to double bass and formed a jazz duo with a pianist, Peter Isackson, who encouraged him to study with Monty Budwig, a member of the house rhythm section at notable Hollywood jazz club Shelly's Manne-hole.

After attending the University of Southern California for a semester, he transferred to the San Francisco Conservatory of Music in 1965. During this period, he lived in nearby Sausalito, California, and began to gravitate toward the incipient rock culture of the Haight-Ashbury district. In 1967, he began working as a session musician, specializing in electric bass, with a litany of notable blues, folk, and rock performers, including Mike Bloomfield, Nick Gravenites, Mississippi Fred McDowell, John Lee Hooker, Brewer & Shipley (a longstanding collaboration that encompassed their 1971 Top Ten hit "One Toke Over the Line"), Tom Fogerty, Maria Muldaur (who was in a relationship with Kahn for several years in the 1970s), Al Kooper, Jackie DeShannon and Otis Rush.

Kahn first played with Garcia in May 1970 as the bassist of a jazz rock group that coalesced around Garcia and organist Howard Wales (who facilitated their introduction) during Monday night jam sessions at The Matrix, a San Francisco nightclub of the era; this ensemble would go on to record Hooteroll? (1971; credited to Garcia and Wales). He also played acoustic bass in Old & In the Way, a bluegrass supergroup that toured in 1973 and 1974. Along with Kahn, the band featured Garcia on banjo and vocals, future progressive bluegrass luminary David Grisman on mandolin and vocals, songwriter Peter Rowan on guitar and vocals, and Vassar Clements on fiddle.

From 1970 to 1975, Kahn played in the Merl Saunders and Jerry Garcia Band and was an integral part of later iterations of the Garcia/Saunders collaboration, including Legion of Mary (1974–1975) and Reconstruction (1978–1979); the latter group was initially intended to serve as a musical outlet for Kahn during Garcia's tours with the Grateful Dead. Kahn was the only founding member of the Jerry Garcia Band (1975–1978; 1980–1995) besides Garcia to remain with the group until its dissolution following the guitarist's death in 1995. He played a few gigs with the band after Jerry's death, in Santa Cruz and at the Warfield, where he wept on stage along with many in the hall. In addition to serving as the band's nominal manager (these responsibilities were delegated to Grateful Dead employees Rock Scully and Steve Parish), he selected the group's repertoire in consultation with Garcia. During this period, he also played alongside Garcia in an acoustic duo, Garcia & Kahn (1982-86, 65 gigs), and the Jerry Garcia Acoustic Band (1987–1988).

Offstage, Kahn and Garcia maintained a close friendship. Although several figures in Garcia's life (including brother Tiff Garcia and Grateful Dead keyboardist Vince Welnick) characterized him as a deleterious influence, daughter Annabelle Garcia was more equanimous: "Yeah, Dad did drugs with John and Linda, but that was just the way it was. They offered my dad a safe haven—a place he could come to get some drugs if he wanted it, and a place to sleep if he needed it, and the company that he needed. [...] John and Linda were very sweet people and I know at least they made my dad feel comfortable."

Despite underlying acrimony stemming from his relationship with Garcia, Kahn did occasional work for the Grateful Dead, serving as a recording engineer alongside Betty Cantor-Jackson and Bob Matthews for the band's aborted Egypt '78 live album documenting performances at the Giza Plateau in September 1978. Selections from these concerts were eventually released as Rocking the Cradle: Egypt 1978 (2008). He also contributed horn arrangements and uncredited organ and additional production to Shakedown Street (1978) following the departure of nominal producer Lowell George.

Kahn died of a heart attack in his sleep on May 30, 1996, in Mill Valley, California.
