= Jon-Erik Kellso =

American jazz trumpeter (born 1964)

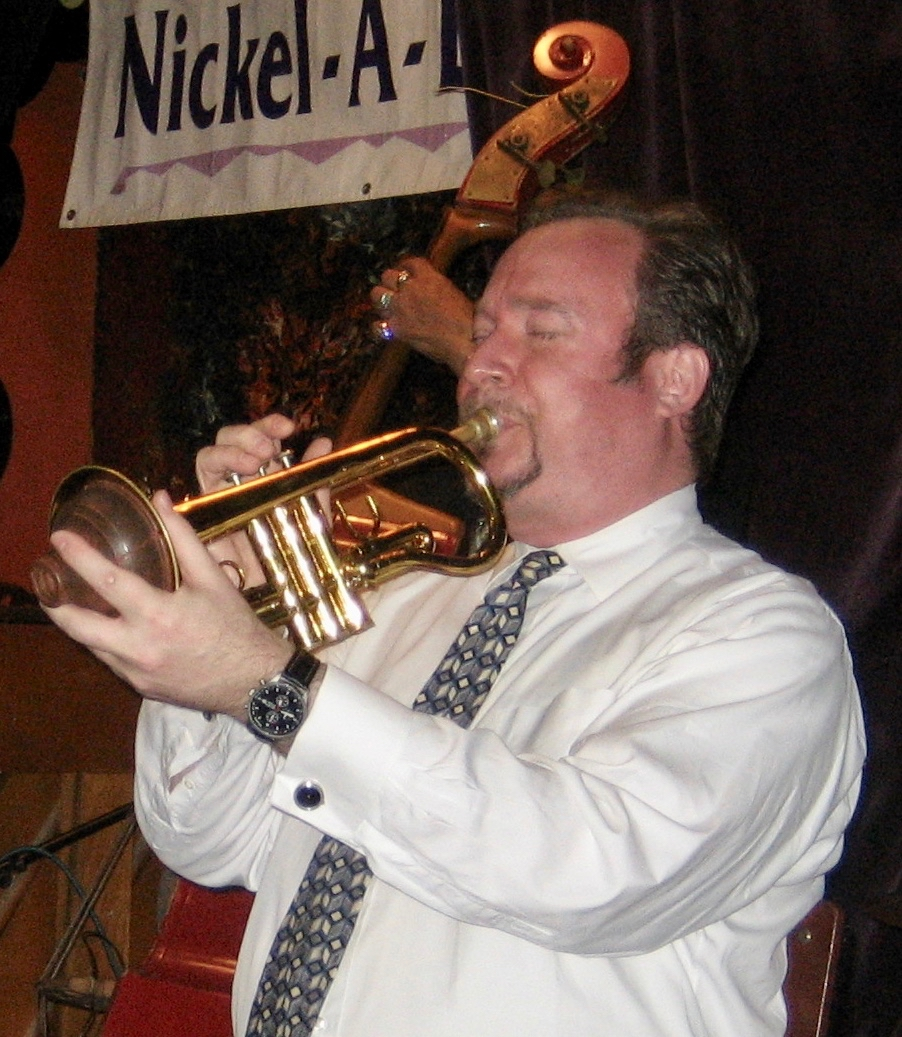
- Kellso in 2007

Background information
- Born: May 8, 1964 (age 62); Dearborn, Michigan, U.S.
- Genre: Jazz
- Occupation: Musician
- Instrument: Trumpet
- Labels: Arbors; gen-Erik; Jazzology
- Member of: Nighthawks Orchestra; EarRegulars
- Website: kellsomusic.com

Jon-Erik Kellso (born May 8, 1964, Dearborn, Michigan) is an American jazz trumpeter and session musician.

Kellso began playing jazz at a young age and also received some formal training in classical music.

Kellso moved from Detroit to New York City in 1989 to join Vince Giordano's Nighthawks Orchestra, with whom he has recorded many movie and TV soundtracks, including the soundtrack for Boardwalk Empire, The Aviator, Bessie, Ghost World, Revolutionary Road, and Blue's Clues.

Kellso has led the EarRegulars at the Ear Inn in Manhattan on Sunday nights since 2007, with whom he has recorded two albums. On the latter live album, he was joined by a tárogató player, a Hungarian woodwind instrument.

Among the jazz musicians he has performed or recorded with include J. C. Heard, Catherine Russell, Cécile McLorin Salvant, Kat Edmonson, James Dapogny, Milt Hinton, Rick Fay, Ralph Sutton, Ruby Braff, Marty Grosz, Bob Haggart, Dick Hyman, Wynton Marsalis, Ken Peplowski, Bucky Pizzarelli, Dan Barrett, Bob Wilber, Howard Alden, Wycliffe Gordon, and Kenny Davern.

Kellso has played and recorded with the pop artists Linda Ronstadt, Leon Redbone, Maria Muldaur, Levon Helm, Elvis Costello, Dave Van Ronk, and others, appearing on over one hundred records.

== Discography ==
=== As leader ===
- Chapter I (Arbors, 1993)
- Chapter Two: The Plot Thickens (Arbors, 1997)
- Kellso's BC Buddies (gen-Erik, 2005)
- Blue Roof Blues: A Love Letter to New Orleans (Arbors, 2007)
- Remembering Ruby (gen-Erik, 2007)
- The EarRegulars (gen-Erik, 2014)
- In the Land of Beginning Again (Jazzology, 2015)
- Sweet Fruits Salty Roots (Jazzology, 2020)
