= Chenille =

Chenille may refer to:

- Chenille fabric, a soft fabric named after french term for caterpillar
- Chenille plant, Acalypha hispida
- Chenille stem, a type of pipe cleaner
- Chenille Sisters, a US folk music group
- Chenille, a character from the DreamWorks Animation film Trolls
- Chenille yarn, a plush, velvety craft yarn
