= Champian Fulton =

American jazz singer and pianist (born 1985)

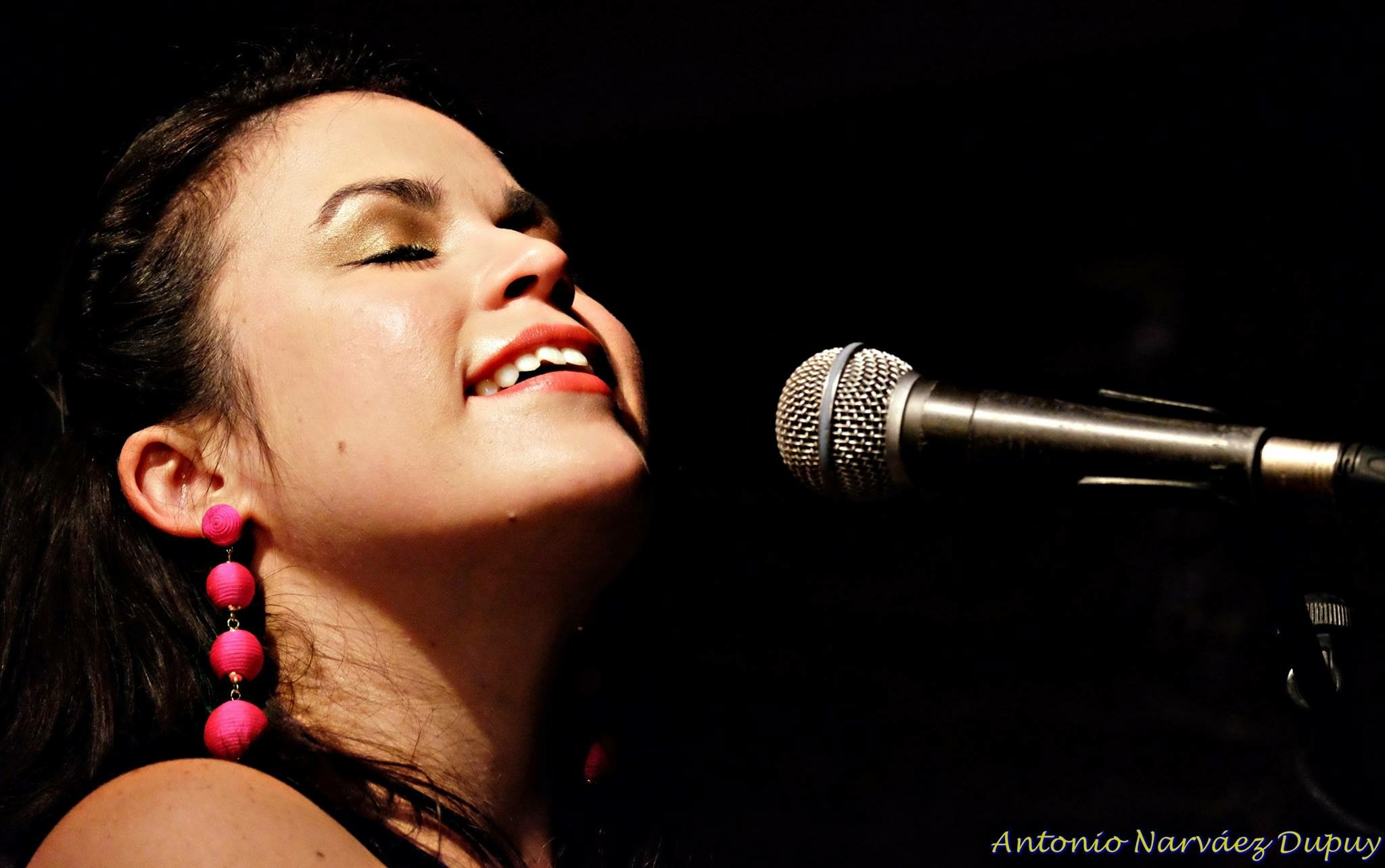

Background information
- Born: September 12, 1985 (age 40); Norman, Oklahoma, U.S.
- Genres: Jazz, swing
- Occupation: Musician
- Instruments: Vocals, piano
- Years active: 2000–present
- Website: www.champian.net

Champian Fulton (born September 12, 1985) is an American jazz singer and pianist.

== Early life and education ==
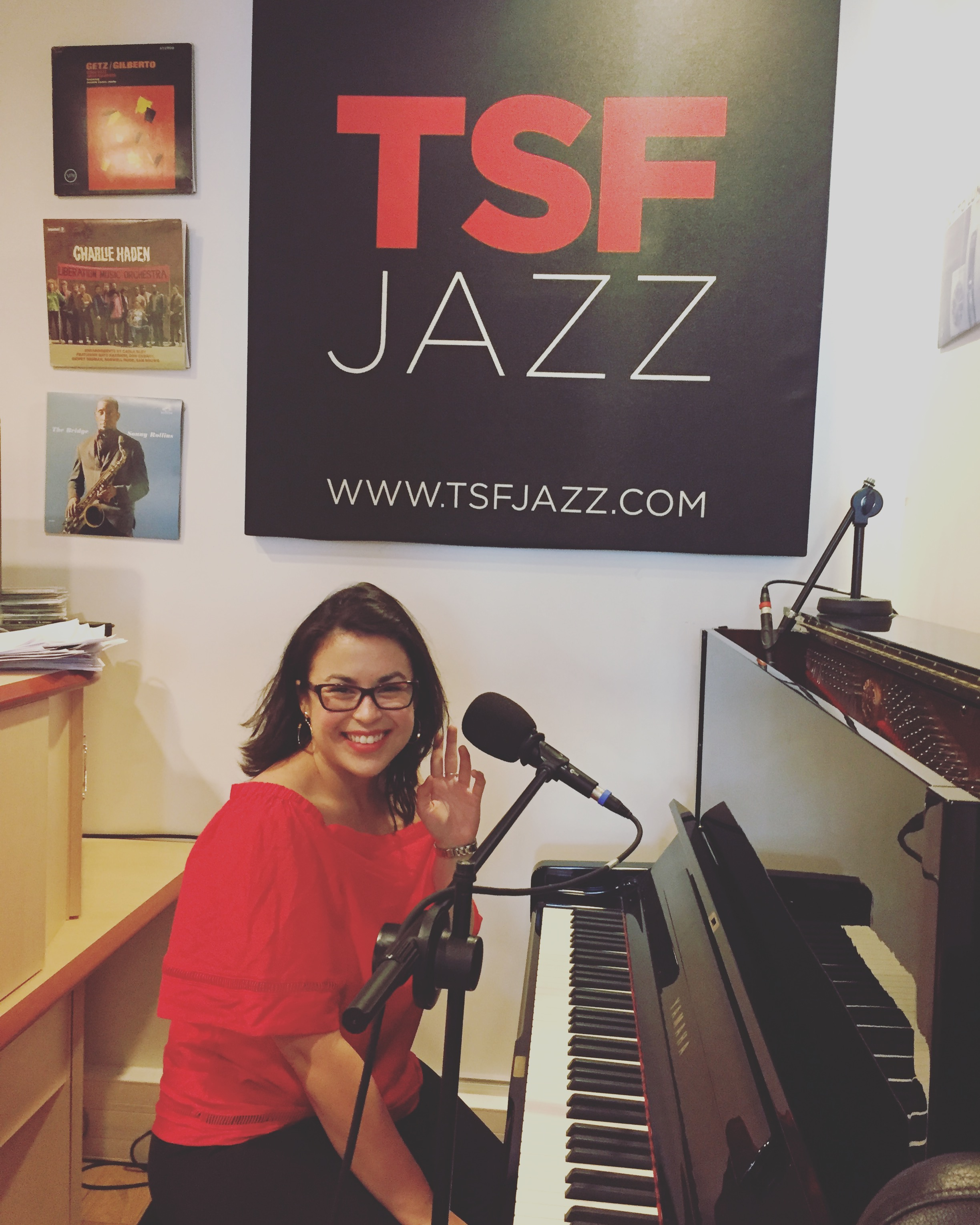
Champian Fulton in red at the TSF Jazz Radio studios, sitting at an upright piano

Champian Fulton was born in Norman, Oklahoma, in 1985. Her father, Stephen Fulton, was a jazz trumpeter who was often visited by musician friends such as Clark Terry and Major Holley. At the age of five, she took piano lessons from her grandmother. After trying trumpet and drums, she returned to piano and singing. When her father was hired to run the Clark Terry Institute for Jazz Studies, the family moved to Iowa. She went to jazz summer camp, where she founded the Little Jazz Quintet. One of their performances was Clark Terry's seventy-fifth birthday party.

Fulton graduated from high school in 2003, then attended State University of New York at Purchase, where she studied with trumpeter Jon Faddis.

== Career ==
After graduating, she moved to New York City to pursue a career as a pianist and vocalist.

=== Live performances ===
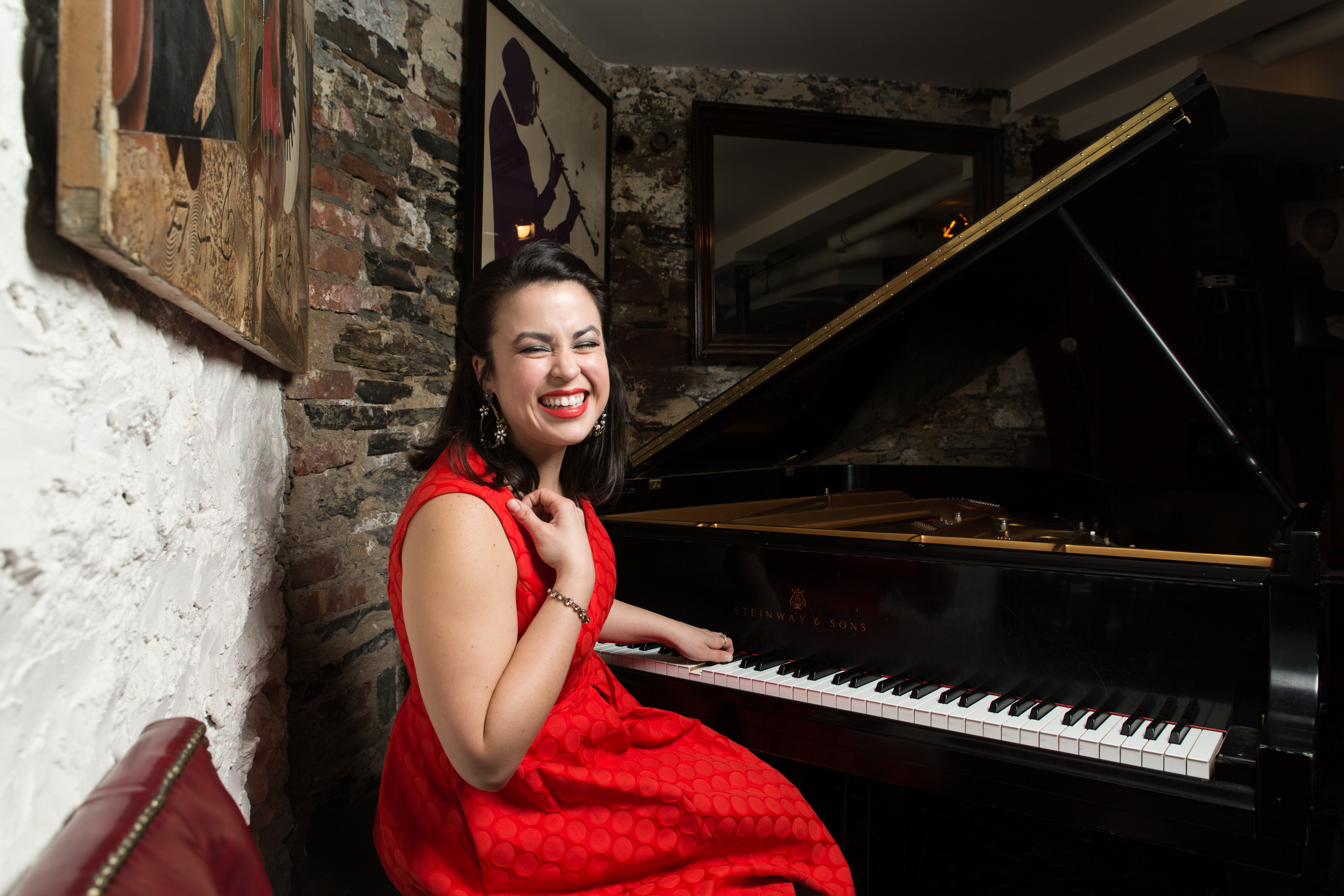
Champian Fulton in a red dress at a grand piano

Fulton has performed in New York City venues, including Birdland, Smalls Jazz Club, Dizzy's Club Coca-Cola, the Carlyle Hotel, Cleopatra's Needle, and Shanghai Jazz, New Jersey. At some of those venues she played with Jimmy Cobb, Scott Hamilton (musician), Frank Wess, Lou Donaldson, and Louis Hayes.

She has performed at jazz festivals and events across the U.S., including Jazz at Lincoln Center, Detroit Jazz Festival, Litchfield Jazz Festival, Rochester International Jazz Festival, Lincoln Center for the Performing Arts, and the Chicago Humanities Festival. Internationally, she has performed at jazz clubs, jazz festivals, and other venues, including Ascona Jazz Festival (Switzerland), Edinburgh Jazz and Blues Festival (Scotland), Sunset-Sunside Jazz Club (France), Bansko International Jazz Festival (Bulgaria), Gouvy Jazz & Blues Festival (Belgium), Jamboree Jazz (Spain), Tanjazz (Morocco), Hot Jazz (Israel), Cellar Jazz (Vancouver, Canada), Yardbird Suite (Edmonton, Canada), JazzTone (Germany), and the Ystad Jazz Festival (Sweden).

She has worked with the Lincoln Center for the Performing Arts, the Litchfield Jazz Camp, and Rutgers University. In late 2015, she joined the faculty of the Jazz Arts Academy (in association with the Count Basie Theatre Education Department) to offer workshops in jazz vocals and jazz piano during the summer.

== Influences ==
One of her early influences was Dinah Washington, particularly the album For Those in Love, which she played often as a young girl. She also admired Sarah Vaughan, Nat King Cole, Sonny Clark, Red Garland, Hampton Hawes, Wynton Kelly, Thelonious Monk, and Art Tatum.

== Awards and honors ==
- Rookie of the Year, The Village Voice, 2007
- Top Ten Jazz Album, Champian Sings and Swings, The New York Observer, 2013
- Rising Star – Female Vocalist, Critics' Poll, Down Beat magazine, 2014
- Female Vocalist of the Year, Hot House Jazz Fan Decision Awards, 2017
- Female Vocalist of the Year, NYC Readers Awards sponsored by Hot House Jazz Magazine & JazzMobile, 2019
- Pianist of the Year, NYC Readers Awards sponsored by Hot House Jazz Magazine & JazzMobile, 2019
- Performs in the Emmy Nominated show, "Take Me Back to Manhattan" (produced by Jazz at the Ballroom and filmed at the Carlyle Hotel), NY Emmy Awards 2022
- At Home nominated for Jazz Heritage Album of the Year, 2025, by the Academie du Jazz Prix

== Discography ==
=== As leader ===
- Champian (Such Sweet Thunder, 2007)
- Sometimes I'm Happy (Venus, 2008)
- The Breeze and I (Gut String, 2011)
- Champian Sings and Swings (Sharp Nine, 2012)
- Change Partners: Live at the Yardbird Suite (Cellar Live, 2014)
- After Dark (Gut String, 2016)
- Speechless (Posi-Tone, 2017)
- Christmas with Champian (Champian, 2017)
- The Things We Did Last Summer with Scott Hamilton (Blau, 2017)
- The Stylings of Champian (Champian, 2018)
- Dream a Little... (Cellar Live, 2019)
- Birdsong (Champian, 2020)
- I'll See You in My Dreams (Venus, 2021)
- Live from Lockdown (Champian, 2021)
- Blue and Sentimental(Venus, 2022)
- Meet Me at Birdland (Champian, 2023)
- Cory Weeds Meets Champian Fulton: Every Now & Then (Cellar Live 2024)
- Flying High (Jazz at the Ballroom, 2024)
- At Home (Turtle Bay Records, 2025)
- Flying High: Still Soaring(Jazz at the Ballroom, 2026)
- House Party (Turtle Bay Records, 2026)

=== As guest ===
- An Upper West Side Story, Tobias Gebb & Trio West with Champian Fulton (Yummyhouse, 2008)
