= Boardwalk Empire Volume 1: Music from the HBO Original Series =

Soundtrack album by Various artists
- Released: September 13, 2011
- Label: Elektra

Boardwalk Empire Volume 1: Music from the HBO Original Series is a soundtrack for the HBO television series Boardwalk Empire, released in September 2011 through Elektra Records. The album reached a peak position of number eight on Billboard's Top Jazz Albums chart and earned the 2012 Grammy Award for Best Compilation Soundtrack for Visual Media.

== Track listing ==
1. "Livery Stable Blues", performed by Vince Giordano and the Nighthawks
2. "The Dumber They Come the Better I Like 'Em", performed by Stephen DeRosa
3. "My Man", performed by Regina Spektor
4. "Darktown Strutters' Ball", performed by Vince Giordano and the Nighthawks
5. "Crazy Blues", performed by Catherine Russell
6. "Mournin' Blues", performed by Vince Giordano and the Nighthawks
7. "Some of These Days", performed by Kathy Brier
8. "Margie", performed by Vince Giordano and the Nighthawks
9. "Carrickfergus", performed by Loudon Wainwright III
10. "Wild Romantic Blues", performed by Nellie McKay
11. "After You Get What You Want (You Don't Want It)", performed by Kathy Brier
12. "The Sheik of Araby", performed by Leon Redbone
13. "Japanese Sandman", performed by Vince Giordano and the Nighthawks
14. "Don't Put a Tax On the Beautiful Girls", performed by Kathy Brier
15. "All by Myself", performed by Martha Wainwright
16. "Life's a Funny Proposition After All", performed by Stephen DeRosa

Track listing adapted from Entertainment Weekly.

Deluxe Version (bonus tracks):

1. "Japanese Sandman (uke version)", performed by Lauren Sharpe
2. "Maple Leaf Rag", performed by Vince Giordano and the Nighthawks
3. "Alice Blue Gown", performed by Amber Edwards
4. "Harlem Strut", performed by Mark Shane
