= Beat Niq =

Beat Niq was a jazz club located at 811 1st Street South West in Calgary, Alberta. Operating between 1997 and 2012, it featured many internationally renowned jazz musicians and was the site of several live album recordings. It was the only jazz club in the city, and along with the Yardbird Suite in Edmonton, one of two in the province.

== History ==
In 1995 owners Robert and Connie Young opened Piq Niq, a restaurant at street level in the Grain Exchange Building on 1st Street. The restaurant featured small jazz groups once a week. In March 1997 the Youngs expanded into the basement below the restaurant, opening a jazz club called Beat Niq. During its time, the club featured many local musicians, bands touring across Canada, and guests from other cities. Frequent performers included the faculty of the jazz program at the Mount Royal College conservatory, and owner Robert Young, also a vocalist. The club also hosted performances during the annual Calgary Jazz Festival.

After 20 years in business, the owners decided a shift in a new direction would be beneficial, and the sale of the business finalized in June 2012.

== Live albums ==
- Don Berner – The Don Berner Sextet Invades Calgary!!! Live at the Beat Niq!!!
- Cici – Live at the Beat Niq
