= Cat tails =

Cat tails, cattail, or cat's tails are common names for several plants and may refer to:

- Various species in the genus Acalypha, particularly
  - Acalypha hispida
- Various species in the genus Bulbinella
- Various species in the genus Typha
- "Cattails", a song by Big Thief from their album U.F.O.F.
- "Cattails", an indie video game made by Falcon Development.

== See also ==
- Ptilotus, pussy tails
