= Boardwalk Empire Volume 2: Music from the HBO Original Series =

Soundtrack album by Various artists
- Released: September 3, 2013
- Label: ABKCO
- Producers: Stewart Lerman, Randall Poster

Boardwalk Empire Volume 2: Music from the HBO Original Series is a soundtrack for the HBO television series Boardwalk Empire, released in September 2013.

== Track listing ==
1. "Strut Miss Lizzie", performed by David Johansen
2. "Old King Tut", performed by Stephen DeRosa
3. "It Had to Be You", performed by Elvis Costello
4. "Everybody Loves My Baby", performed by Vince Giordano & the Nighthawks
5. "You've Got to See Mama Ev'ry Night (Or You Can't See Mama at All)", performed by Liza Minnelli
6. "Baby Won't You Please Come Home", performed by Leon Redbone
7. "Make Believe", performed by St. Vincent
8. "Lovesick Blues", performed by Pokey LaFarge
9. "Nobody Knows You When You're Down and Out", performed by Neko Case
10. "Who's Sorry Now", performed by Karen Elson
11. "You'd Be Surprised", performed by Stephen DeRosa
12. "I'm Going South", performed by Margot Bingham
13. "Sugarfoot Stomp", performed by Vince Giordano & the Nighthawks
14. "Jimbo Jambo", performed by Rufus Wainwright
15. "There'll Be Some Changes Made", performed by Kathy Brier
16. "Somebody Loves Me", performed by Margot Bingham
17. "All Alone", performed by Chaim Tannenbaum
18. "The Prisoner's Song", performed by Loudon Wainwright III
19. "I Ain't Got Nobody", performed by Patti Smith
20. "I'll See You in My Dreams", performed by Matt Berninger

Track listing adapted from Pitchfork.

Deluxe Version (bonus tracks):

1. "Oh! Gee, Oh! Gosh, Oh! Golly I'm In Love", performed by Stephen DeRosa
2. "Oh Sister, Ain't That Hot!", performed by Vince Giordano and the Nighthawks
3. "Down In Jungle Town", performed by Vince Giordano and the Nighthawks
