= Adrienne Haan =

German-Luxembourgish actress and cabaret singer

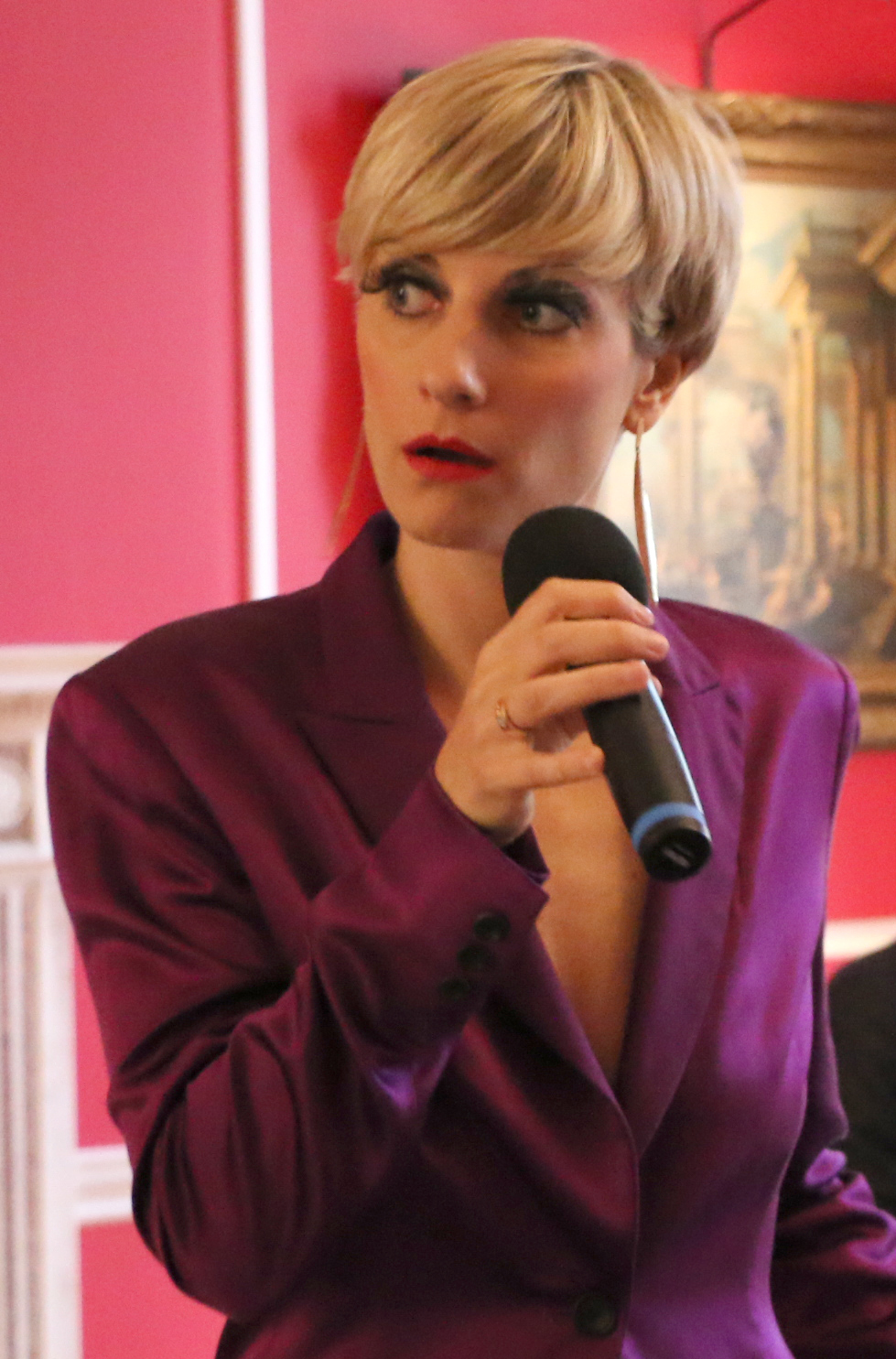
- Haan in 2017
- Born: April 7, 1978 (age 48); Essen, Germany
- Education: American Academy of Dramatic Arts and St. Mary's University in London (Twickenham), England
- Years active: 1999–present
- Spouse: Klaus Liever (2007–present)
- Website: www.adriennehaan.com/en

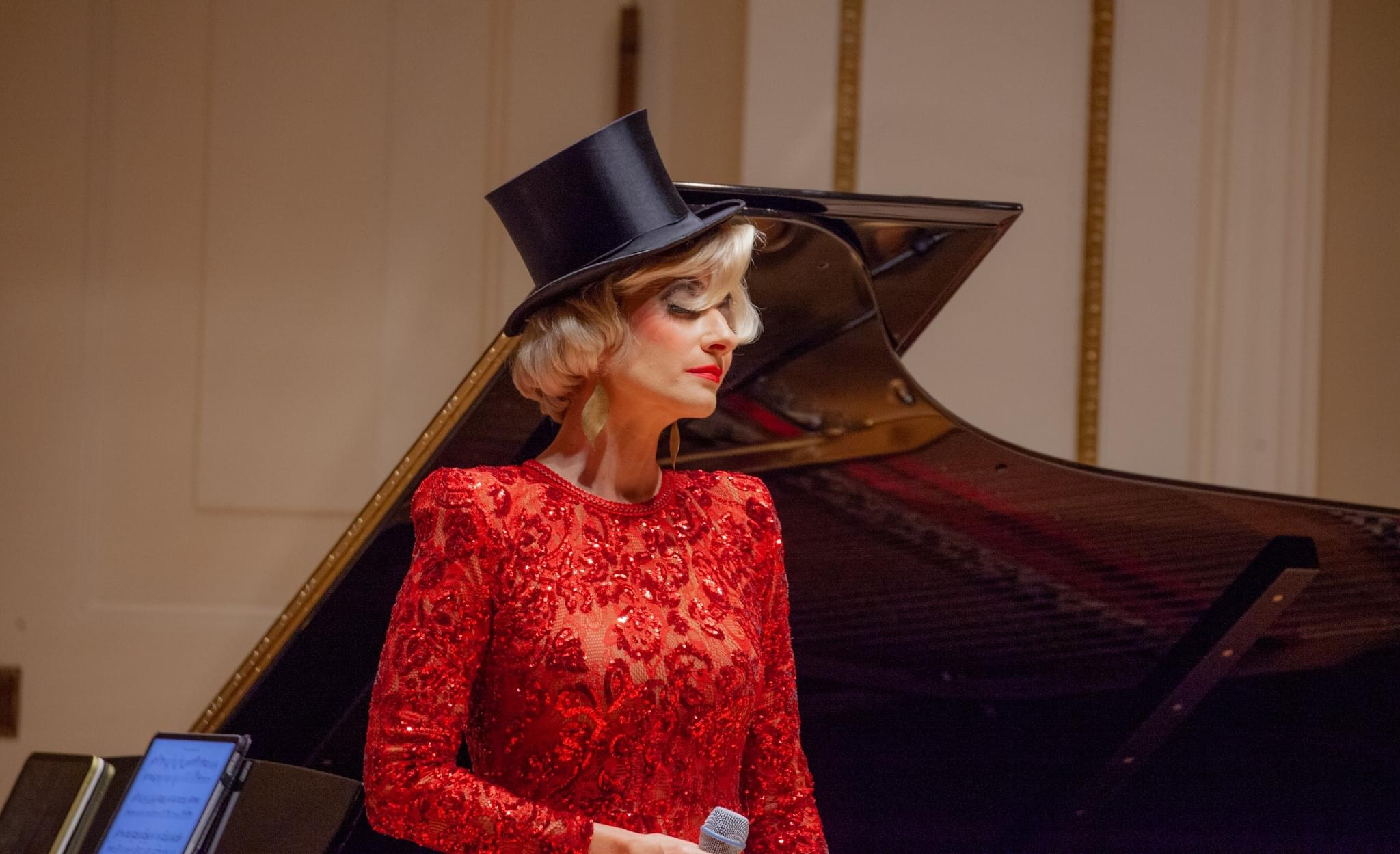
Adrienne Haan performing at Carnegie Hall 2023

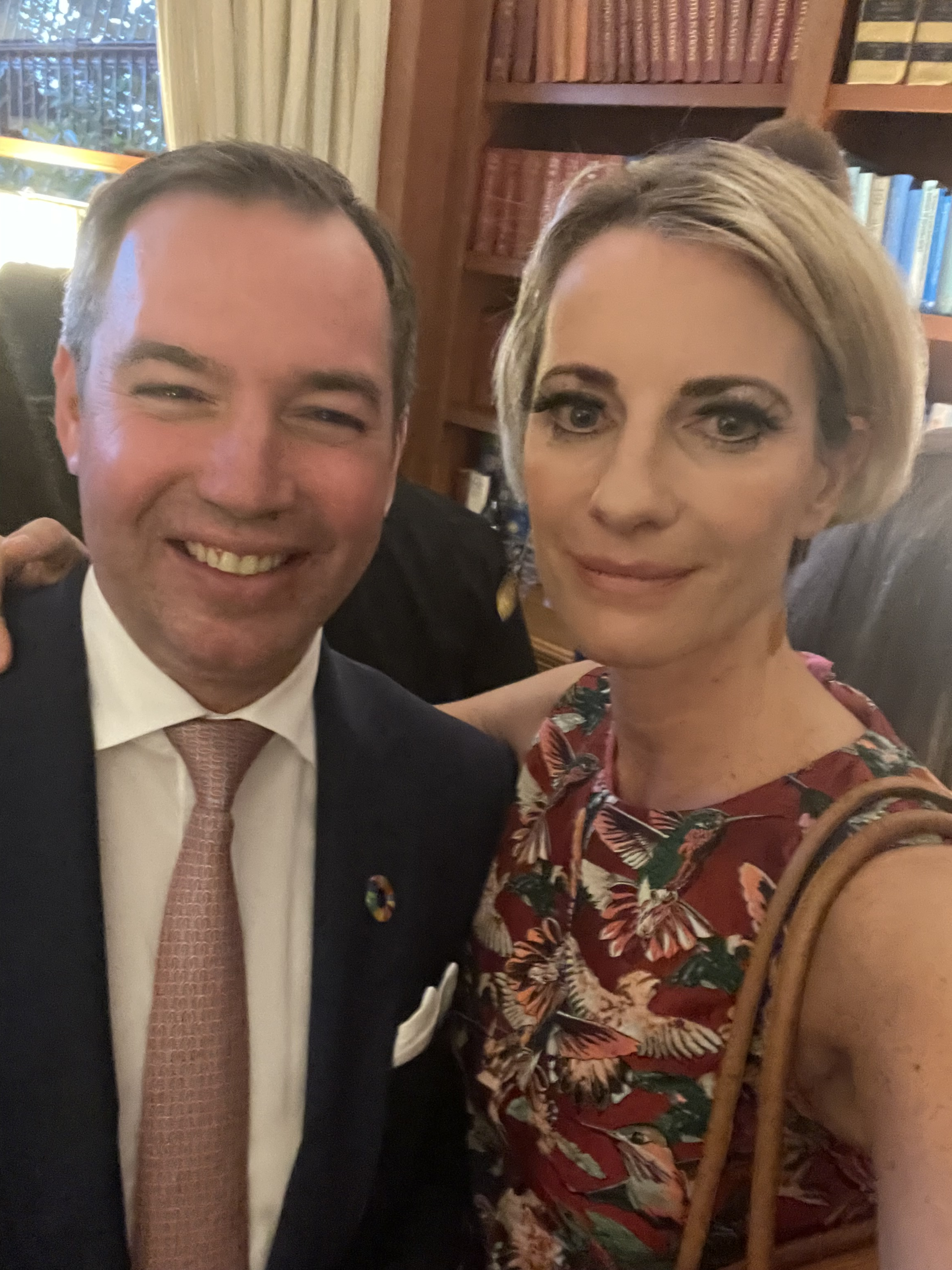
Adrienne Haan with Gauillaume, Hereditary Grand Duke of Luxembourg at an event during the General Assembly of the United Nations in NY

Adrienne Haan (born April 7, 1978) is a German-Luxembourgish actress, singer, writer and producer who has appeared in theatre, cabaret and concert.

== Background ==
Adrienne Catherine Haan was born in Essen, West Germany on April 7, 1978. She holds dual citizenship in Germany and Luxembourg and she is a permanent resident of the United States of America. Her moniker is "Chanteuse Internationale".

== Education ==
Haan graduated from American Academy of Dramatic Arts in 1999. In 2019, she received her master's degree in Applied Linguistics and English Language Teaching from St. Mary's University in London (Twickenham), England. She also attended courses at The Juilliard School in New York City and at the Cologne School of Music and Dance.

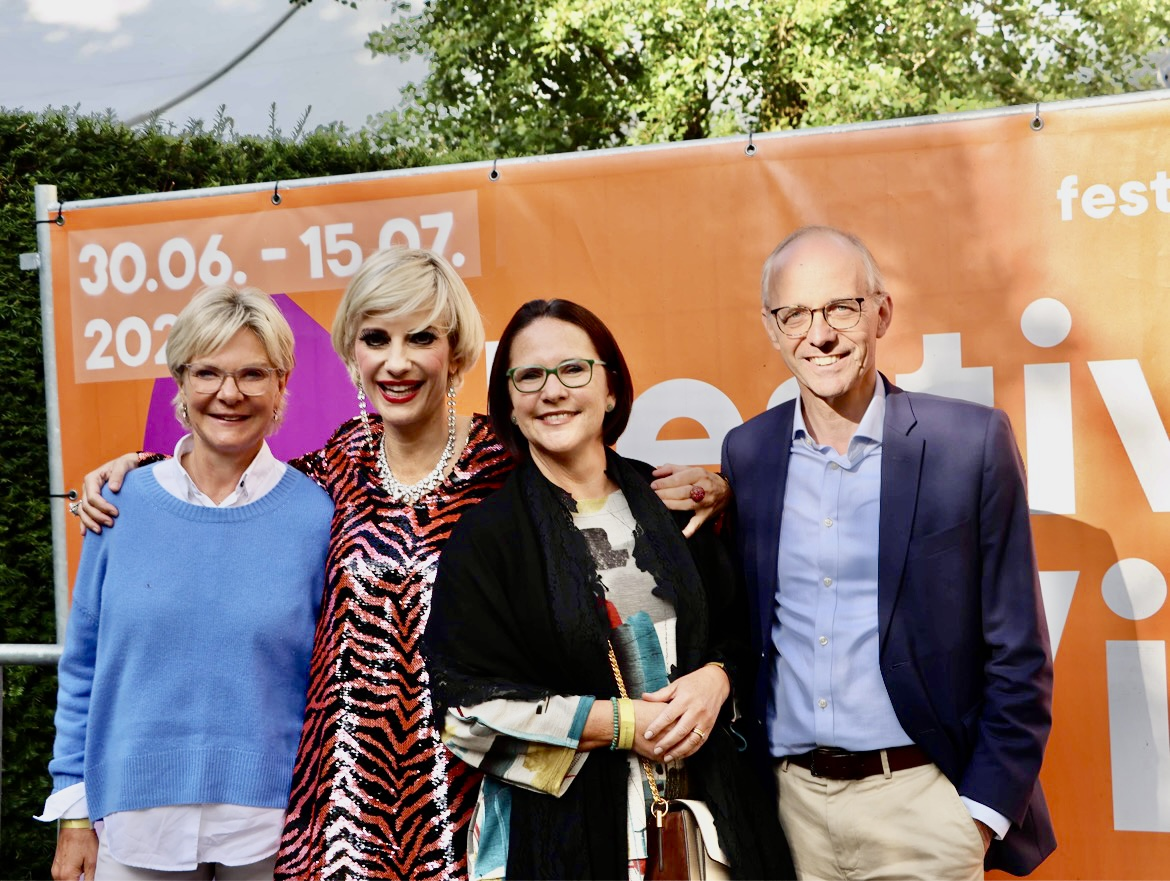
Adrienne Haan at the renowned Festival de Wiltz, Luxembourg, 2023. With Luc Frieden, Prime Minister of Luxembourg and Yuriko Backes, Luxembourg's Minister of Defense (middle)

== Career ==
Haan is an actress and singer who specializes in music of the 1920s and 30s, particularly the music of the Weimar period and the music of Kurt Weill. Since 1999, she has performed in cabarets and on concert stages in the United States, South America, Europe, Israel, Turkey, China, Africa and Australia where is known for historically accurate renditions of songs in English, German, Luxembourgish, Swedish, French, Spanish, Italian, Hebrew, Yiddish, Turkish, Armenian, Ukrainian, Mandarin and Zulu. In 2019, she made her debut in Turkey, where she performed for the European Delegation in Ankara on Europe Day 2019 and a performance with her pianist at the Palais de France in Istanbul where she sang the tribute to Mustafa Kemal Atatürk, "Yiğidim Aslanım". In 2019, she made her first tour of China, performing her show Broadway Rock Hall. Her Carnegie Hall debut entitled Tehorah celebrated the 50th anniversary of German-Israeli diplomatic relations with an encore performance in Washington DC and at Ravinia. She returned to Carnegie Hall with Tehorah in May 2023. Haan has also performed Tehorah for the International Holocaust Remembrance Alliance (IHRA) under patronage of his Royal Highness, the Grand Duke of Luxembourg at the theater in Esch/Alzette, Luxembourg. She also performed at the Jewish Festival Warszawa Singera in Warsaw at the Nowy Teatr in Łódź, Poland and at the White Synagogue in Wrocaw, Poland under the patronage of the Ambassador of the Grand Duchy of Luxembourg to the Republic of Poland, Conrad Bruch. She has performed in the US Embassy of Luxembourg and was featured in a 6 city tour of Israel with the Netanya Orchestra. She has performed at cabarets in New York City including Cafe Sabarsky, 54 Below, Joe's Pub where she performed her show Voluptuous Weimar with Vince Giordano & The Nighthawks and the Metropolitan Room as well as the Triad Theatre in New York City where she is artist in residence. Her additional shows include Cabaret Français which she performed at the Embassy of Luxembourg Washington DC in March 2019, her Kurt Weill Soirée, featuring the Dan Levinson Sextet and her Weimar Berlin soirée Berlin, Mon Amour featuring French singer/dancer Magali Dahan. In New Mexico, she performed as part of the Santa Fe Jewish Film Festival. In 2022, Adrienne was hired by the Permanent Mission of the International Francophonie at the United Nations in New York, to musically represent the Grand Duchy of Luxembourg during the 77th General Assembly of the United Nations in NY. She is the first and only Luxembourg artist so far to receive this honor.

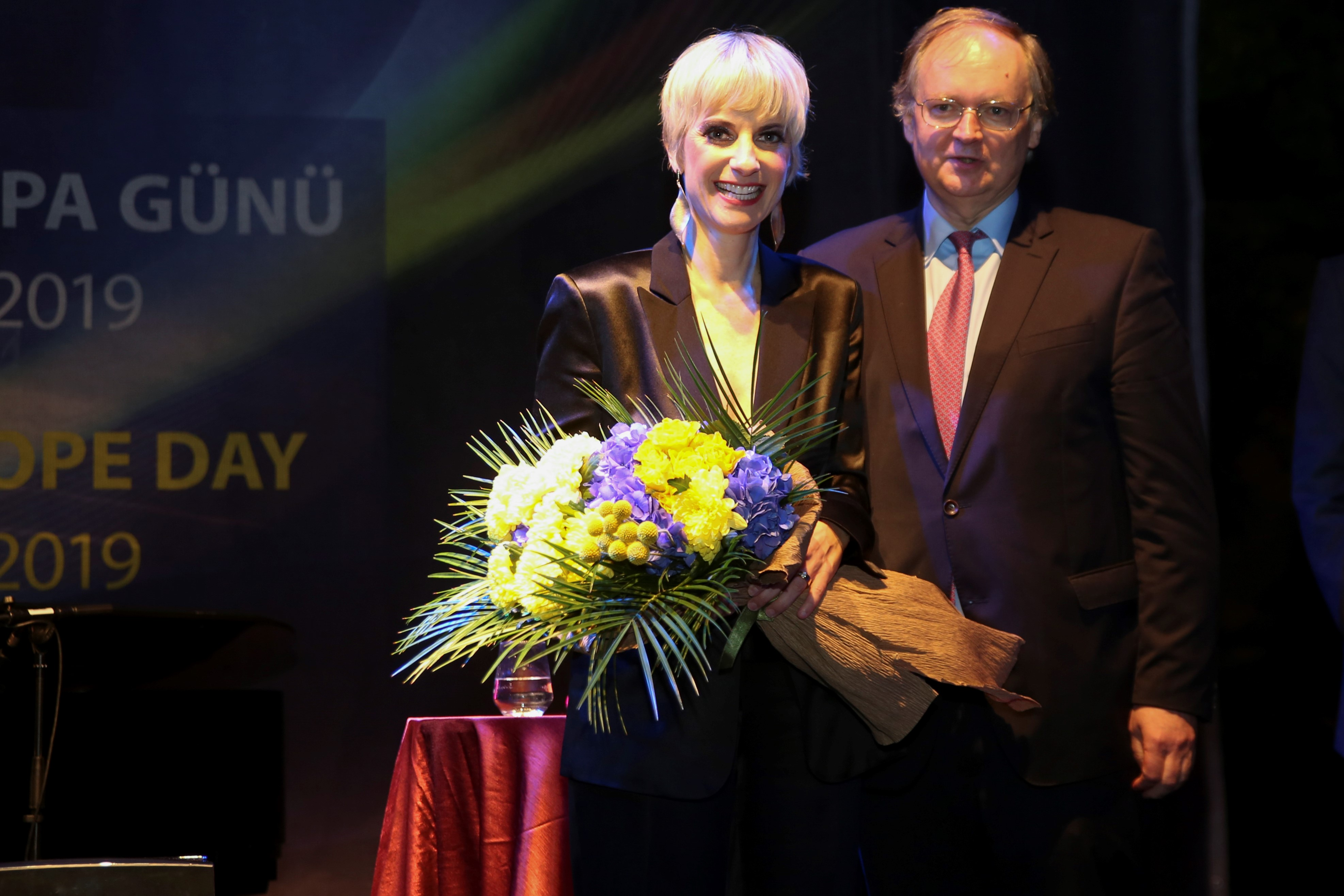
Adrienne Haan Europe Day 2019 Istanbul, Turkey

Her theater and musical productions include lead roles in Les Misérables, Evita, Cats, Cabaret, Sunset Boulevard, King Henry VI, and Richard III. Her cabaret show, The Streets of Berlin, is based on Berlin, mon amour, her most recent CD which was released in both German and English in 2010. Both the show and the recording include works by Mischa Spoliansky, Kurt Weill, and Bertolt Brecht arranged for voice, big band and string quartet by Heinz Walter Florin. Her earlier CDs include music by Andrew Lloyd Webber and Claude-Michel Schönberg. In Europe, she has appeared on the "Westdeutscher Rundfunk" Television Channel.

Her latest albums Tehorah in German, Yiddish and Hebrew as well as her rock tribute to the French Chanson Rock Le Cabaret! were both published during the COVID-19 pandemic and have received critical acclaim.

In New York City Haan serves on the International Advisory Board of the Duke Ellington Center for the Arts.

Since 2021, Adrienne has been a member of the Dramatist Guild of the United States of America.

She also serves on the honorary entertainment board of the "Survivor Mitzvah Project" helping Holocaust Survivors in Eastern Europe to a better quality of living.

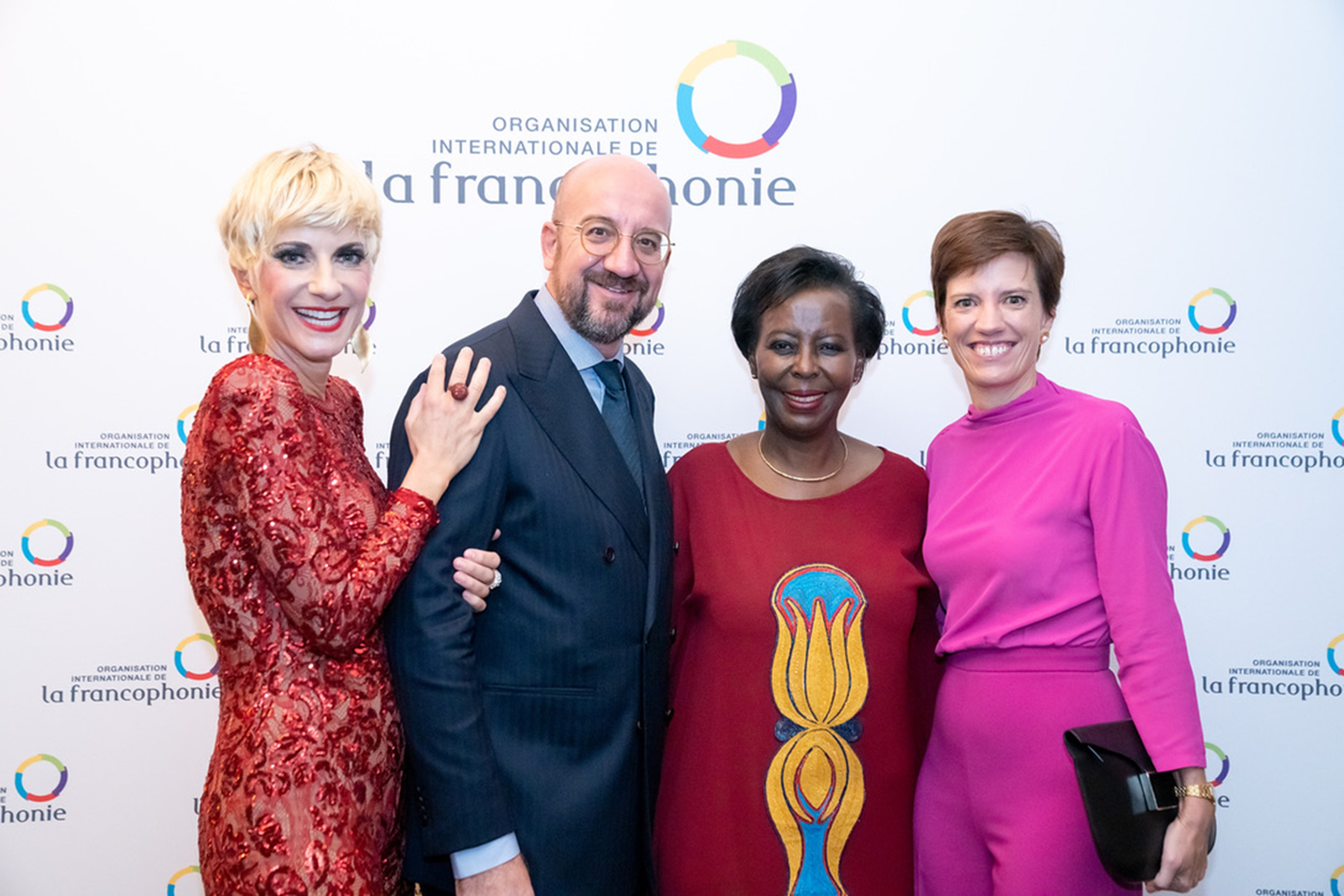
Performance during the 77th General Assembly of the United Nations in NY. With Charles Michel, president of the European Council, September 2022

== Personal life ==
In 2007, Haan married Klaus Liever. Her father, Jean Joseph Haan, is a neurologist, and her mother worked as a medical technical assistant. She has one brother.

== Discography ==
- 2020: Tehorah Villa Artis, Königswinter, Germany
- 2020: Rock Le Cabaret! Studio der Welt, Cologne, Germany
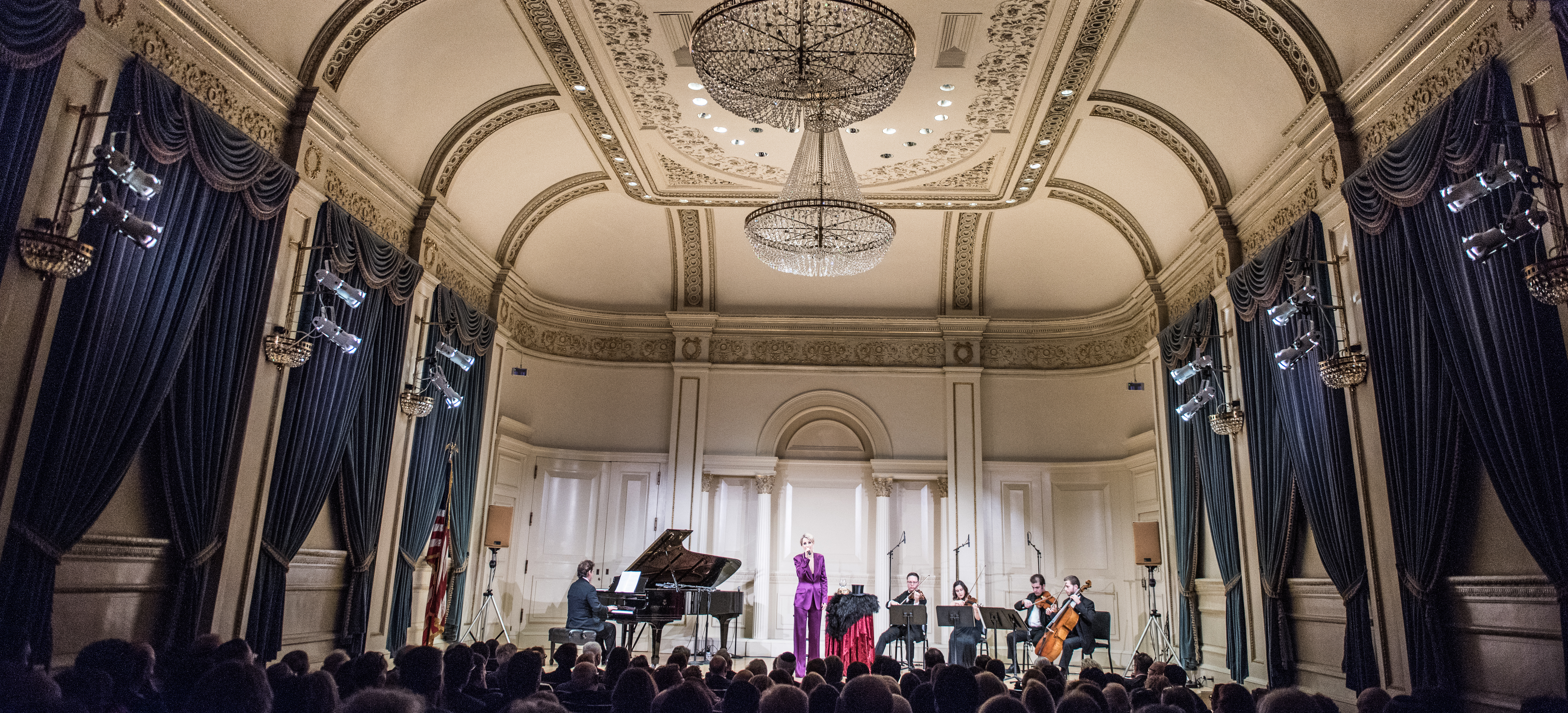
- Adrienne Haan performing at Carnegie Hall, 2015
  2010: Berlin, Mon Amour Berlinica
- 2006: I Could Have Danced All Night Reader's Digest
- 2003: Born to Entertain: Hansahaus Studios in Bonn (Germany)
