= Red to Blue =

Studio album by Leon Redbone
- Released: 1986
- Recorded: 1985
- Studio: Mediasound, New York City, New York; Sigma Sound, Philadelphia, Pennsylvania
- Genre: Jazz, blues
- Length: 31:51
- Label: August
- Producer: Beryl Handler, Leon Redbone

Leon Redbone chronology
Leon Redbone Live (1985)	Red to Blue (1986)	No Regrets (1988)

Red to Blue is an album by the American musician Leon Redbone, released in 1986. It was his first album for August Records, a label started by Redbone. Redbone supported the album with a North American tour.

== Production ==
The album was produced by Beryl Handler and Redbone. David Bromberg accompanied Redbone on the cover of the Bob Dylan song "Living the Blues". Hank Williams Jr. provided a spoken part for the cover of his father's version of "Lovesick Blues". Biréli Lagrène played guitar on "Whose Honey Are You?" The Roches contributed backing vocals; Dr. John played piano. The album title comes from a Jelly Roll Morton quote that describes the transition from Spanish musical styles to blues-based ones.

== Critical reception ==
Professional ratings
Review scores
Source	Rating
AllMusic	3/5 stars
MusicHound Folk: The Essential Album Guide	4/5 stars

The New York Times wrote that "Leon Redbone carries to a peak his mixture of jazz-filtered old pop songs, blues and 'contemp-folk' with the assistance of a pool of traditional jazz and folk-jazz musicians who light momentarily like hummingbirds in these performances, then take off again." The Columbia Daily Tribune said that the album "saunters and shuffles like an old hepcat, past his prime but still jiving along at his own unhurried pace."

The Vancouver Sun determined that "Redbone's almost hallucinogenic, sweeping you up in the gentle swing of his music and transporting you back to a '30s dance hall." The Atlanta Journal-Constitution deemed the album "his standard fare—barely intelligible vocals that get so loooow, clarinets, coronets, guitars, banjoes and tuba." Likewise, the Detroit Free Press considered it "the same old hambone."

AllMusic praised "the usual Dixieland backing augmenting his tasteful fingerpicked guitar work."

== Track listing ==
No.	Title	Writer(s)	Length
1.	"Diamonds Don't Mean a Thing"	Leon Redbone	3:02
2.	"Lovesick Blues"	Cliff Friend, Irving Mills	2:44
3.	"Reaching for Someone and Not Finding Anyone There"	Walter Donaldson, Edgar Leslie	2:08
4.	"Somebody Stole My Gal"	Leo Wood	2:08
5.	"Steal Away Blues"	Redbone	2:34
6.	"Aw You Salty Dog"	Redbone	3:18
7.	"Border of the Quarter"	Owen Davis	3:01
8.	"Someday Sweetheart"	Benjamin Franklin Spikes, John Spikes	2:37
9.	"Whose Honey Are You?"	J. Fred Coots, Haven Gillespie	2:11
10.	"Living the Blues"	Bob Dylan	2:22
11.	"Nobody Cares If I'm Blue"	Harry Akst, Grant Clark	2:41
12.	"Think of Me Thinking of You"	Charlie Abbott, Johnny Marvin, Dale Wimbrow	3:23

== Personnel ==
Musicians

- Leon Redbone – guitar, vocals
- Dr John – piano
- Arnie Kinsella – drums
- Giampaolo Biagi – drums
- Hank Williams Jr. – vocals (track 2)
- Eddie Davis – guitar
- Eric Weissberg – steel guitar, pedal steel guitar, pedal steel banjo
- Steve Fishell – steel guitar
- David Bromberg – dobro, vocals (track 10)
- Howard Alden – guitar, banjo
- Gary Peacock – bass (upright), vocals
- Vince Giordano – bass, bass (upright), drums, percussion, sax (bass), tuba
- Alvin E. Roger – violin
- Richard Hendrickson – violin
- Richard Maximoff – violin
- Andy Stein – violin, backing vocals
- Biréli Lagrène – guitar (track 9)
- Big Jonny Dong – tuba
- Dan Barrett – trombone
- Joel Helleny – trombone
- Scott Black – cornet
- Ken Peplowski – clarinet
- Charlie Wilson – clarinet
- Bobby Gordon – clarinet
- Joe Muranyi – clarinet
- Terry Waldo – piano
- The Roches – backing vocals

Technical

- Leon Redbone, Beryl Handler – producers
- Doug Epstein – engineer
- Victor Deyglio, Bruce Smith – assistant engineers
- Michael Tarsia – dialogue engineer
- Greg Calbi – mastering engineer
- Emmett Miller & His Georgia Crackers – arrangements
- Joe Renzetti – string arrangements
- Michael Horen – cover art
- Leon Redbone – cover drawing
