= No Regrets (Leon Redbone album) =

Studio album by Leon Redbone
- Released: 1988
- Recorded: 1988
- Studio: Nashville Sound Connection, Nashville TN
- Genre: Country, jazz
- Length: 38:55
- Label: Sugar Hill
- Producer: Beryl Handler, Leon Redbone

Leon Redbone chronology
Red to Blue (1986)	No Regrets (1988)	Christmas Island (1988)

No Regrets is an album by the musician Leon Redbone, released in 1988. It followed a period where Redbone had concentrated on music for commercials. Redbone supported the album with a North American tour; he also appeared on The Tonight Show Starring Johnny Carson. The album was reissued in 2004.

== Production ==
Recorded in Nashville, the album was produced by Beryl Handler and Redbone. Béla Fleck played banjo on the album. Jerry Douglas contributed on pedal steel and dobro; Cindy Cashdollar played steel guitar on some tracks. "My Good Gal's Gone Blues" and "Somewhere Down Below the Dixon Line" were written by Jimmie Rodgers. "It's a Lonely World" is a version of the Ernest Tubb song; Tubb was one of Redbone's primary influences.

== Critical reception ==
Professional ratings
Review scores
Source	Rating
AllMusic	3.5/5 stars
MusicHound Folk: The Essential Album Guide	4/5 stars

The Chicago Tribune wrote: "Employing a bluesy sound often reminiscent of primitive New Orleans jazz ... Redbone achieves an uncanny resemblance to the sound and spirit of country music's early recordings." The Washington Post concluded that "Redbone's a kind of cartoon persona with one of popular music's most eccentric voices: muzzy, slurred and entirely enjoyable if you get the joke." The Key West Citizen called the album "a stunning collection of classic country and jazz songs."

The Atlanta Journal praised the "smoothly delivered songs." The Austin American-Statesman stated that Redbone's "smooth, penetrating bass voice sparks renewed life into lost ditties." The Nanaimo Daily News noted that, "as usual, Redbone's bluesy and laidback and in fine form."

Ronnie D. Lankford, Jr. of AllMusic wrote that, "while the songs and vocals are technically solid, they lack the spark that made earlier Redbone albums something special."

== Track listing ==
No.	Title	Writer(s)	Length
1.	"She Ain't Rose"	Kellye Gray, Gary Vincent	2:12
2.	"Wild and Wicked Ways"	Sam Nichols	2:33
3.	"She's My Gal"	Leon Redbone	2:38
4.	"Crazy Arms"	Ralph Mooney, Chuck Seals	3:45
5.	"Long Gone Lonesome Blues"	Hank Williams	2:41
6.	"Somewhere Down Below the Dixon Line"	Jimmie Rodgers, Will Ryan	2:49
7.	"Lazy Bones"	Hoagy Carmichael, Johnny Mercer	3:19
8.	"It's a Lonely World"	Redd Stewart, Ernest Tubb	3:02
9.	"Another Story, Another Time, Another Place"	Arlie Duff	2:34
10.	"You Nearly Lose Your Mind"	Tubb	2:36
11.	"Mr. & Mrs. Used to Be"	Billy Joe Deaton	2:34
12.	"Some Sweet Day"	Tony Jackson, Abe Olman, Ed Rose	2:25
13.	"My Good Gal's Gone Blues"	Rodgers	3:20
14.	"Are You Lonesome Tonight"	Lou Handman, Roy Turk	2:27

== Personnel ==
Musicians

- Leon Redbone – vocals, guitar
- Roy Huskey Jr. – double bass (upright)
- Brian Nalepka – double bass (upright)
- Mark O'Connor – violin, viola, mandolin, mandola
- Béla Fleck – banjo
- Al Vescovo – pedal steel guitar
- Jerry Douglas – pedal steel guitar, dobro
- Cindy Cashdollar – lap steel guitar, dobro
- Terry Waldo – piano
- Bunky Keels – piano
- John Gill – drums, tenor banjo
- Lori Lynn Smith – vocal (track 11)

Technical

- Beryl Handler, Leon Redbone – producers
- Doug Epstein, Bil Vorn Dick – engineers, mixing engineers
- John Gill – arrangements, music coordination
- Jim Loyd – mastering engineer
- Raymond Simone – cover design
- Leon Redbone – cover concept
- Dan Lamb – photography
