= Any Time =

Studio album by Leon Redbone
- Released: 2001
- Label: Blue Thumb
- Producer: Beryl Handler, Leon Redbone

Leon Redbone chronology
| Whistling in the Wind (1994) | Any Time (2001) | Live – October 26, 1992: The Olympia Theater, Paris, France (2005) |

Any Time is an album by the musician Leon Redbone, released in 2001. It was his first album in seven years. Redbone supported the album with North American and European tours.

== Production ==
Redbone recorded the songs over a long period of time, until he had enough to fill an album. Frank Vignola played guitar on the album. "Sweet Substitute" and "If You Knew" are versions of the Jelly Roll Morton songs. "Your Feets Too Big" is a version of the song made famous by Fats Waller; it was originally for Harry and the Hendersons. The Persuasions sang on the version of "In the Shade of the Old Apple Tree".

== Critical reception ==
Professional ratings
Review scores
| Source | Rating |
|---|---|
| AllMusic | 4/5 stars |
| Birmingham Post | 3/5 stars |
| Edmonton Journal | 3.5/5 stars |
| Los Angeles Daily News | 3.5/4 stars |
| The Press of Atlantic City | 3/4 stars |
| The Tampa Tribune | 2.5/4 stars |

The Los Angeles Daily News wrote that "the small-band jazz arrangements may be of a certain period, but Redbone's world-weary emotionalism will strike a chord with anyone who fancies themselves a prisoner of love." The Edmonton Journal said that "liberal doses of clarinet, belching tubas, ragtime piano fills, and bright yet brittle guitar licks provide the foundation for tunes." The Birmingham Post determined that Redbone "knows his musical history and brings just the right amount of dedication to his performance, coupled with that tip of tongue in cheek."

The Washington Post noted that, "to hear Bob Gordon's clarinet skipping around Redbone's sleepy croon on Morton's 'If You Knew' is to understand how happily jazz and pop cohabited for a brief period." The Tampa Tribune concluded that Redbone "coddles each song as if he were inspecting antique miniatures and marveling at their intricacies."

AllMusic wrote that "the crooner takes listeners back to a time when Herbert Hoover or Franklin Delano Roosevelt was in the White House, and he maintains a relaxed, congenial, laid-back ambience on vintage tunes."

== Track listing ==
| No. | Title | Length |
|---|---|---|
| 1. | "Any Time" |
| 2. | "If You Knew" |
| 3. | "Ain't Gonna Give You None of My Jelly Roll" |
| 4. | "All I Do Is Dream of You" |
| 5. | "Louisiana Fairytale" |
| 6. | "So Tired of Livin' All Alone" |
| 7. | "Sittin' on Top of the World" |
| 8. | "Sweet Substitute" |
| 9. | "Blossoms on Broadway" |
| 10. | "In the Shade of the Old Apple Tree" |
| 11. | "Sweet Lorraine" |
| 12. | "Moonlight Bay" |
| 13. | "Your Feets Too Big" |
