= Sugar (Leon Redbone album) =

Studio album by Leon Redbone
- Released: 1990
- Recorded: 1990
- Studios: Manhattan Recording, New York; Soundtrack, New York
- Genres: Jazz, blues
- Length: 34:59
- Label: Private
- Producers: Beryl Handler, Leon Redbone

Leon Redbone chronology
Christmas Island (1988)	Sugar (1990)	Live! (1991)

Sugar is an album by the musician Leon Redbone, released in 1990. Redbone supported the album with a North American tour. A video was shot for "So, Relax".

== Production ==
Redbone used ribbon microphones during the recording sessions. Ken Peplowski played saxophone and clarinet. Cindy Cashdollar contributed on dobro; Dan Barrett on trombone. "Right or Wrong" and "Ghost of the St. Louis Blues" are versions of songs made famous by Emmett Miller; Redbone considered Miller to be a chief influence on the album, and thought about writing a book on the musician. Redbone's guitar playing was influenced by Blind Blake. "Pretty Baby" is a version of the Tony Jackson song.

Redbone wrote three of the album's songs. He included "The Whistling Colonel" after a movie studio instead chose to use one of his older songs on a soundtrack.

== Critical reception ==
Professional ratings
Review scores
Source	Rating
AllMusic	4/5 stars
Calgary Herald	C
Chicago Tribune	3/4 stars
The Encyclopedia of Popular Music	3/5 stars
MusicHound Folk: The Essential Album Guide	4/5 stars

The Chicago Tribune deemed the album "another quaint and charming set shaped by the minstrel tunes, blues and jazz of the early 1900s." The Calgary Herald recommended the album "for those who like their aural history lessons arch." The Edmonton Journal stated that "shades of Django Reinhardt, New Orleans, gutbucket blues, dixie, Broadway and bluegrass sounds are somehow stitched together with loving care."

The Gazette concluded that "if a Bugs Bunny cartoon could sing, Leon Redbone's voice would bubble out of its technicolor throat." The Washington Post noted the absence of "the kind of nimble fingerstyle guitar arrangements Redbone previously devised to revive songs."

== Track listing ==
No.	Title	Writer(s)	Length
1.	"Ghost of the St. Louis Blues"	Billy Curtis, John Robinson	2:55
2.	"Roll Along Kentucky Moon"	Bill Halley	3:08
3.	"Right or Wrong"	Haven Gillespie, Arthur Sizemore	2:28
4.	"Laughin' Blues"	Terry Waldo	2:26
5.	"Breeze"	Joe Goodwin, James F. Hanley, Ballard MacDonald	3:32
6.	"The Whistling Colonel"	Leon Redbone	2:46
7.	"Sugar"	Edna Alexander, Sidney Mitchell, Maceo Pinkard	2:09
8.	"Pretty Baby"	Tony Jackson, Gus Kahn, Egbert Van Alstyne	3:05
9.	"When I Take My Sugar to Tea"	Pierre Norman Connor, Sammy Fain, Irving Kahal	2:19
10.	"What You Want Me to Do"	Dave Nelson, Joseph (King) Oliver	2:50
11.	"Messin' Around"	Traditional	2:27
12.	"So, Relax"	Beryl Handler, Redbone	2:28
13.	"14th Street Blues"	Handler, Redbone	2:55
