= Christmas Island (Leon Redbone album) =

Studio album by Leon Redbone
- Released: 1988
- Recorded: 1988
- Studio: Manhattan Recording Company
- Genres: Jazz, Christmas music
- Length: 30:19
- Labels: August; Private Music
- Producers: Beryl Handler, Leon Redbone

Leon Redbone chronology
No Regrets (1988)	Christmas Island (1988)	Sugar (1990)

Christmas Island is an album by the musician Leon Redbone. It was released in 1988, with a re-release the following year.

The title track has been mentioned in many works of fiction.

== Production ==
The album was recorded in three days. Redbone picked songs that he thought would appeal to listeners who didn't usually enjoy Christmas music. He duetted with Dr. John on "Frosty the Snowman". "Winter Wonderland" contains a dobro solo. "Christmas Ball Blues" is a version of the song made popular by Bessie Smith.

== Critical reception ==
Professional ratings
Review scores
Source	Rating
AllMusic	3/5 stars
Robert Christgau	B+
The Encyclopedia of Popular Music	3/5 stars
MusicHound Folk: The Essential Album Guide	3.5/5 stars
Orlando Sentinel	4/5 stars

Robert Christgau wrote: "Beyond sacred schlock-by-association and rock and roll gifts, Christmas is a pop holiday that plays best in the background, which suits Redbone's forgettable old-timey lassitude." The Philadelphia Inquirer concluded that, "with a deep, wavery delivery, the growl-voiced blues-folkie comes across as a kind of Crosby on Quaaludes." The St. Petersburg Times stated that Redbone's "trademark laconic style puts an entirely new spin on these tunes."

The Washington Post determined that "after a while the effortless renditions start sounding too similar." The Los Angeles Times deemed the album "sultry, desert-island swing." The Orlando Sentinel noted the "bittersweet" atmosphere, writing that the songs are "exceptional, true-to-the-original versions." The Toronto Sun opined that Redbone's "cornball style is tailor-made for traditional hokum."

AllMusic praised Redbone's "joyous performance."

== Track listing ==
No.	Title	Writer(s)	Length
1.	"White Christmas"	Irving Berlin	2:22
2.	"Winter Wonderland"	Felix Bernard, Dick Smith	2:33
3.	"Frosty the Snowman"	Steve Nelson, Jack Rollins	1:58
4.	"Blue Christmas"	Bill Hayes, Jay Johnson	2:27
5.	"There's No Place Like Home for the Holidays"	Robert Allen, Al Stillman	2:36
6.	"Toyland"	Victor Herbert, Glen MacDonough	2:37
7.	"Christmas Island"	Lyle Moraine	3:39
8.	"That Old Christmas Moon"	Terry Waldo	3:03
9.	"I'll Be Home for Christmas"	Kim Gannon, Walter Kent	2:40
10.	"Let It Snow"	Sammy Cahn, Jule Styne	2:39
11.	"Christmas Ball Blues"	Traditional	3:05

== Personnel ==
Musicians

- Leon Redbone – vocals, guitar
- Dr John – piano, vocals, percussion
- Terry Waldo – piano, vocals
- John Gill – drums, banjo, bass saxophone, string arranger
- Brian Nalepka – double bass, accordion
- Cindy Cashdollar – dobro, vocals
- Bobby Gordon – clarinet
- Richard Henrickson, George Wozniak, Kathryn Kienke – violins
- Doug Epstein, Betsy – vocals
- Santa – bells, chimes, sleigh bells

Technical

- Leon Redbone, Beryl Handler – producers
- Doug Epstein – engineer, mixing engineer
- Jim Lloyd – mastering engineer
- Leon Redbone – cover design, concept
- Mark Larson – art direction, design
- Elsa Bouman – artwork
- Tish Fried – artwork coordinator
- Scott Weiner, Laura Levine – photography
