= On the Track (album) =

Studio album by Leon Redbone
- Released: 1975
- Recorded: 1975
- Studio: Regent, New York City
- Genre: Ragtime
- Length: 38:13
- Label: Warner Bros.
- Producer: Joel Dorn

Leon Redbone chronology
On the Track (1975)	Double Time (1977)

On the Track is the debut album by Leon Redbone, released on Warner Bros. Records in 1975, and reissued on CD in 1988.

The album features a cover illustration by Chuck Jones depicting the character Michigan J. Frog.

Professional ratings
Review scores
Source	Rating
AllMusic	4.5/5 stars
Christgau's Record Guide	B+
Rolling Stone	(not rated)

== Track listing ==
Side one

1. "Sweet Mama Hurry Home or I'll Be Gone" (Jack Neville, Jimmie Rodgers) – 2:49
2. "Ain't Misbehavin'" (Harry Brooks, Andy Razaf, Fats Waller) – 4:03
3. "My Walking Stick" (Irving Berlin) – 3:41
4. "Lazybones" (Hoagy Carmichael, Johnny Mercer) – 3:06
5. "Marie" (Irving Berlin) – 4:24

Side two

1. "Desert Blues (Big Chief Buffalo Nickel)" (Jimmie Rodgers) – 3:42
2. "Lulu's Back in Town" (Al Dubin, Harry Warren) – 2:34
3. "Some of These Days" (Shelton Brooks) – 3:16
4. "Big Time Woman" (Wilton Crawley) – 2:44
5. "Haunted House" (Lonnie Johnson) – 4:58
6. "Polly Wolly Doodle" (Traditional) – 2:56

== Personnel ==
Musicians

- Leon Redbone – vocals, guitar, harmonica
- Phil Bodner – saxophone
- Patti Bown – piano
- Garnett Brown – trombone
- Jonathan Dorn – tuba
- Steve Gadd – drums
- Emanuel Green – violin
- Milt Hinton – double bass
- Leo Kahn – violin
- Ralph MacDonald – percussion, castanets
- Charles Macey – guitar
- Don McLean – banjo
- Gene Orloff – violin
- Seldon Powell – saxophone
- Billy Slapin – clarinet
- Joe Venuti – violin
- Joe Wilder – trumpet, cornet

Production

- Joel Dorn – producer
- Bob Liftin – engineer
- William Eaton – string & horn arrangements
- Vince McGarry – mastering engineer
- Chuck Jones – artwork
- Tom Zito – photography

== Certifications ==
Region	Certification	Certified units/sales
United States (RIAA)	Gold	500,000^{^}
^{^} Shipments figures based on certification alone.
