= Up a Lazy River (album) =

Studio album by Leon Redbone
- Released: 1992
- Label: August/Private Music
- Producers: Beryl Handler, Leon Redbone

Leon Redbone chronology
Live! (1991)	Up a Lazy River (1992)	Whistling in the Wind (1994)

Up a Lazy River is an album by the American musician Leon Redbone, released in 1992. Redbone supported the album with a North American tour. The first single, "Play Gypsy Play", was a minor radio hit in France. "Bittersweet Waltz" first appeared on an episode of the television show Life Goes On.

== Production ==
The album was produced by Beryl Handler and Redbone. Redbone wrote three of its songs. Dr. John played keyboards on "When Dixie Stars Are Playing Peek-a-Boo" and other tracks. Cindy Cashdollar played dobro on the album; Alfredo Pedernera contributed on bandoneon. "Gotta Shake That Thing" is a cover of the Papa Charlie Jackson song. "You're a Heartbreaker" is a version of the song made famous by Elvis Presley. "At the Chocolate Bon Bon Ball", a ragtime tune, was performed as a tango.

== Critical reception ==
Professional ratings
Review scores
Source	Rating
AllMusic	4/5 stars
The Buffalo News	4/5 stars
The Indianapolis Star	3/4 stars
MusicHound Folk: The Essential Album Guide	3.5/5 stars

The Indianapolis Star determined that "the Hoagy Carmichael title track is irresistibly crooned by Redbone in his best boo-boo-boo-boo fashion as almost a lullaby." The Chicago Tribune called the album "another relaxed float down an old-time stream, the banks lined with happy musicians strumming old-timey blues, Tin Pan Alley and ragtime tunes." Stereo Review wrote that "Redbone's shtick of old-timey jazz, blues, and vaudeville wore thin a long time ago ... the sidemen, especially cornetist Scott Black and bass-sax player Vince Giordano, do their best to dress things up for public consumption."

The St. Louis Post-Dispatch noted that "the music of a bygone era begins to sound fresh as the songs validate themselves endlessly with timeless melodies, thoughtful lyrics and Redbone's terrific guitar playing." The Santa Cruz Sentinel said that "Redbone always wisely centers his arrangements around his own drawling baritone and unerring guitar work." The Asbury Park Press concluded that Redbone "has stuck it out admirably, and proven to be a keeper of the ragtime flame, not a mere '20s and '30s poseur."

AllMusic wrote: "Sporting an unmistakable and remarkably limber baritone, Redbone continues his fusion of Americana with some distinct and flavorful overtones that would not sound out of place in the Django Reinhardt and Stephane Grappelli-led Quintet of the Hot Club of France."

== Track listing ==
No.	Title	Writer(s)	Length
1.	"Play Gypsy Play"	Leon Redbone; Scott Black	3:09
2.	"At the Chocolate Bon Bon Ball"	Edward G. Nelson; Harry Edelheit; Harry Pease	2:39
3.	"Lazy River"	Hoagy Carmichael; Sidney Arodin	3:04
4.	"When Dixie Stars Are Playing Peek-a-Boo"	Al Bernard; J. Russel Robinson	3:03
5.	"Mr. Jelly Roll Baker"	Traditional	2:48
6.	"Gotta Shake That Thing"	Traditional	2:35
7.	"You're a Heartbreaker"	Jack Sallee	2:09
8.	"Bittersweet Waltz"	Craig Safan; Mark Mueller	2:50
9.	"Goodbye Charlie Blues"	Redbone	3:13
10.	"That Old Familiar Blues"	Redbone; Black	3:42
11.	"A Dreamer's Holiday"	Kim Gannon; Mabel Wayne	2:59
12.	"I'm Going Home"	Joe McCoy	2:56
Total length:			35:07
