= James Dapogny =

American musician (1940–2019)

James Elliot Dapogny (September 3, 1940, Berwyn, Illinois – March 6, 2019, Ann Arbor, Michigan) was an American jazz musicologist, pianist, composer, arranger and bandleader, active principally in the traditional jazz revival scene.

== Early life ==
Dapogny earned a Ph.D. in composition, and taught at the University of Michigan beginning in 1966. Dapogny led an ensemble called James Dapogny's Chicago Jazz Band, founded in 1975, which played with Sippie Wallace and the Chenille Sisters and made many appearances on Prairie Home Companion.

Dapogny wrote extensively about Jelly Roll Morton, including liner notes for the release of his Library of Congress recordings. He also edited Jazz Masterworks Editions, a series initiated by Oberlin College and the Smithsonian Institution.

== James Dapogny's Chicago Jazz Band members ==
- Jon-Erik Kellso – trumpet
- Mike Karoub – bass
- Russ Whitman – reeds
- Kim Cusack – reeds
- Chris Smith – trombone
- Rod McDonald – guitar, banjo
- Wayne Jones – drums

== Discography ==
- The Piano Music of Jelly Roll Morton (Smithsonian Folkways, 1976)
- Back Home in Illinois (Jazzology, 1982)
- Chicago Jazz Band (Jazzology, 1982)
- How Could We Be Blue? (Stomp Off, 1988)
- The Way We Feel Today (Stomp Off, 1988)
- Laughing at Life (Discovery, 1992)
- Original Jelly Roll Blues (Discovery, 1993)
- Hot Club Stomp: Small Band Swing (Discovery, 1995)
- On the Road (Schoolkids, 1995)
- Rhythm Club (Jazz Pie, 2006)
