= It's De Lovely – The Authentic Cole Porter Collection =

Compilation album by Cole Porter
- Released: June 22, 2004
- Recorded: May 4–5, 2004 (Tracks 1 and 2); 1928–1962 (All others)
- Genre: Traditional pop
- Length: 60:07
- Labels: Bluebird(RCA), BMG

It’s De Lovely – The Authentic Cole Porter Collection is a 2004 compilation album featuring music by American composer Cole Porter presented by Bluebird Records. The album solely contains compositions by Cole Porter performed by his contemporaries who were also under contract to RCA Victor and its subsidiary, Bluebird.

The album was released just prior to the July 2, 2004 premier of the Cole Porter biopic De-Lovely starring Kevin Kline. The original 1934 version of "You're the Top" plays over the end credits.

In addition, it features two tracks recorded by Porter himself in 1934 for the Victor Corporation and overdubbed with additional instrumentation by Vince Giordano and his Nighthawks.

Both overdubbed tracks have been featured in video games such "You're the Top" in 2007's BioShock and "Anything Goes" in 2008's Fallout 3, 2015's Fallout 4 and 2018's Fallout 76.

== Recording ==
From the liner notes written by jazz critic Will Friedwald:

"What's special about this collection is that the selections you will hear are of Porter's own era, the performances that he himself heard when the songs were still fresh...Yet though the range of performers is extremely diverse, they all have two things in common. First, there's the unifying factor of Porter's music itself - whether it's being essayed by Sonny Rollins, Leo Reisman or Dinah Shore, or blown up through the a [sic] big band, these are the important Cole Porter songs from his own era. The second is that all these artists were under contract to RCA Victor, the recording company committed to recording Porter's music, including those sections featuring Cole Porter himself."

"This current collection illustrates Cole Porter's eternal topicality in more ways than one; now, for the first time, we have Cole Porter, singing his own songs, with full orchestral accompaniment. Porter himself was far from a virtuoso pianist like his younger contemporary George Gershwin, nor did he take the occasional opportunity to put his voice down on wax, like Harold Arlen. He enjoyed singing and playing his own songs at parties, but that was principally when he was young and unknown; once the great stars began singing his music, he no longer felt the urge to do so himself. In 1934 and '35, Porter recorded eight rather modest tracks for the Victor Corporation, including, most importantly, a few future standards from his most recent Broadway hit, Anything Goes, The tracks sound like songwriter demos, and, as comedian Bert Lahr (who starred in two Porter shows), observed, "Cole was a horrible piano player. He played with a slow, wooden tempo. If you didn't know who it was, you'd think it was a learner."

"But at the same time, this is authentic Cole Porter, and thanks to producer Barry Feldman and bandleader and multi-instrumentalist Vince Giordano, the Cole Porter Victor tracks are no longer mere historical curiosities. Now we can hear what Porter would have sounded like had he taken his singing seriously enough to work with a stylish, modern dance orchestra of the art deco era. To make sure the band parts would have an absolutely authentic mid-'30s sound, Mr. Giordano unearthed six different charts on each song, including four from the band book of the period bandleader Arnold Johnson (who, coincidentally, had employed a young Harold Arlen as arranger and vocalist a few years earlier). Mr. Giordano and his aide-de-camp banjo-guitarist John Gill combined aspects of the different arrangements, and then finessed them to fit around the Porter recordings."

"Where the orchestrations are for dance purposes, which is to say that they're predominantly instrumentals, with brief one-chorus vocal refrains in the middle (an usually a modulation to the vocal), the Porter performances are essentially vocal from beginning to end. Adjustments had to be made for the key for Anything Goes (Porter sings, surprisingly, in B flat, a full step below the published key of C, which is the key that the orchestrations are in). Vince notes that this idea of improving upon a classical recording after the fact is also part of the Victor Records heritage; a decade or so after the death of Enrico Caruso, Victor house musical director Nathaniel Shilkret added a modern, electrically recorded symphony orchestra to some of the great tenor's originally acoustically recorded masters. Nearly 70 years later, Giordano and his Nighthawks - now expanded to include a three-piece string section - listened with headphones to the composer's performance of 70 years ago to make sure everything synced up perfectly."

Professional ratings
Review scores
Source	Rating
Allmusic	4.5/5 stars
All About Jazz	4/4 stars

== Packaging and artwork ==
The CD is styled to resemble the black and gold "scroll" label of the Victor Talking Machine Company. The back of the liner notes features a facsimile of the original 78 rpm shellac record and record sleeve of the American issue of Cole Porter's vocal rendition of "You're the Top" (Catalog No. 24766).

The liner notes also contain scans of portions of the 1934 Victor recording contract signed by Cole Porter and company president Eli Wallerstein along with the recording session index card for "Anything Goes" (Catalog No. 24825).

== Track listing ==
All songs written and composed by Cole Porter. All tracks except for 1 and 2 have been previously issued.

No.	Title	Music	Recording date	Length
1.	"Anything Goes"	Cole Porter with Vince Giordano and The Nighthawks	November 27, 1934 (overdubbing: May 4, 2004)	3:11
2.	"You're the Top"	Cole Porter with Vince Giordano and The Nighthawks	November 26, 1934 (overdubbing: May 5, 2004)	3:27
3.	"Begin the Beguine"	Artie Shaw and his orchestra	July 24, 1938	3:16
4.	"From This Moment On"	Lena Horne with Lennie Hayton and his orchestra	April 4, 1956	1:57
5.	"You Do Something to Me"	Sonny Rollins and Jim Hall	January 30, 1962	6:47
6.	"It's De-Lovely"	Shorty Rogers and his Giants	April 19, 1957	2:30
7.	"Night and Day"	Frank Sinatra with Axel Stordahl and his orchestra	January 19, 1942	3:05
8.	"Let's Misbehave"	Irving Aaronson and his Commanders with Phil Saxe and Chorus	March 1, 1928	2:53
9.	"Don't Fence Me In"	Roy Rogers	1952	2:47
10.	"You'd Be So Nice to Come Home To"	Dinah Shore with Paul Wetstein and his orchestra	July 30, 1942	2:55
11.	"I Love Paris"	Coleman Hawkins with Manny Albam and his orchestra	July 9, 1956	3:33
12.	"Easy to Love"	Al Bowlly with Ray Noble and his orchestra	September 25, 1936	3:13
13.	"Just One of Those Things"	Lena Horne with Lennie Hayton and his orchestra	March 4, 1957	2:02
14.	"What Is This Thing Called Love?"	Leo Reisman and his orchestra with Lewis Conrad and Bubber Miley	January 30, 1930	3:20
15.	"I've Got You Under My Skin"	Paul Desmond with Bob Prince and his orchestra	1962	4:34
16.	"I Get a Kick Out of You"	Tommy Dorsey and his orchestra	January 4, 1950	2:55
17.	"Night and Day"	Leo Reisman and his orchestra with Fred Astaire	November 22, 1932	3:28
18.	"You Do Something to Me"	Rosemary Clooney with Perez Prado and his orchestra	August 15, 1959	1:35
19.	"Night and Day"	Juan García Esquivel and his orchestra	January 29, 1958	2:39

== Personnel ==
- Cole Porter - composer
- Vince Giordano - arranger
- Barry Feldman - overdubbing engineer
- Tory Halderson - recording engineer
- Will Friedwald - compilation and annotations
- Nathan Sedlander - producer
