= Barbara Rosene =

American jazz singer

Barbara Rosene is an American jazz singer.

Born in Cleveland, Ohio, Rosene grew up hearing jazz and big band music from her father's record collection. Her grandfather was a singer in the 1920s and '30s and performed on the radio in Cleveland.

Barbara Rosene majored in English at John Carroll University and picked up early experience singing with the school choir, performing with a big band and at a jazz bar. Early on she was influenced by Annette Hanshaw and Mildred Bailey. Her love for 1920s music has been with her much of her life.

After moving to New York City in 1997, Rosene auditioned successfully for Vince Giordano's Nighthawks over the phone. She performed regularly with Giordano for a couple of years, and he assisted her on her first album, Deep Night, a tribute to Annette Hanshaw.

Rosene has sung with Les Paul and with Woody Allen's New Orleans jazz band. Since 2007 she has sung with the Harry James Orchestra directed by Fred Radke.

== Discography ==
- Deep Night (Stomp Off, 2001)
- Celebrating Bix (Arbors, 2003)
- Ev'rything's Made for Love (Stomp Off, 2004)
- All My Life (Azica, 2005)
- Moon Song (Stomp Off, 2005)
- It Was Only a Sun Shower (Stomp Off, 2007)
- On the Brink (BluesBack, 2010)
- Nice and Naughty (Stomp Off, 2013)
