= Double Time (Leon Redbone album) =

Studio album by Leon Redbone
- Released: 1977
- Studios: Regent, NYC, and Village, Los Angeles
- Genre: Ragtime
- Length: 34:43
- Label: Warner Bros.
- Producer: Joel Dorn

Leon Redbone chronology
On the Track (1975)	Double Time (1977)	Champagne Charlie (1978)

Professional ratings
Review scores
Source	Rating
AllMusic	4.5/5 stars
Christgau's Record Guide	B−

Double Time is the second studio album by singer/guitarist Leon Redbone, released in 1977. It peaked at No. 38 on the Billboard pop albums chart.

== Track listing ==
Side one

1. "Diddy Wa Diddie" (Blind Blake) – 3:05
2. "Nobody's Sweetheart" (Ernie Erdman, Gus Kahn, Billy Meyers, Elmer Schoebel) – 2:13
3. "Shine On Harvest Moon" (Nora Bayes, Jack Norworth) – 3:21
4. "Crazy Blues" (trad. arr. Perry Bradford) – 4:16
5. "Mississippi Delta Blues" (Jack Neville, Jimmie Rodgers) – 1:44

Side two

1. "Mr. Jelly Roll Baker" (Traditional) – 3:43
2. "My Melancholy Baby" (Ernie Burnett, George A. Norton, Maybelle Watson) – 3:10
3. "The Sheik of Araby" (Harry Smith, Ted Snyder, Francis Wheeler) – 2:31
4. "Mississippi River Blues" (Rodgers) – 3:05
5. "Winin' Boy Blues" (Jelly Roll Morton) – 4:17
6. "If We Never Meet Again This Side of Heaven" (Albert E. Brumley) – 3:18

== Personnel ==
Musicians Source:

- Leon Redbone – vocals, guitar, throat tromnet, background whistling on "Crazy Blues"
- Jack Noseworthy – pan flute
- Milt Hinton – double bass
- Jo Jones – drums
- Bob Greene – piano
- Don McLean – banjo on "Mississippi Delta Blues"
- Eric Weissberg – banjo on "Shine On Harvest Moon"
- Dominic Cortese – accordion
- Jonathan Dorn – tuba
- Yusef Lateef – soprano saxophone on "Mississippi River Blues"
- Ed Polcer – trumpet
- Ed Barefield – clarinet
- Vic Dickenson – trombone
- Dick Rath – trombone
- Joe Wilder – trumpet on "Nobody's Sweetheart"
- Kermit Moore – cello
- Selwart Clarke – viola
- Lewis Elgy – violin
- Sanford Allen – violin
- Captain Billy's Whiz Bang (William Kruse, Frederick Mount III, Andrew Smith, Mark S. Bentley) – backing vocals on "Shine On Harvest Moon"
- The Dixie Hummingbirds (Ira Tucker Sr., James Walker, James Davis, Beachy Thompson) – backing vocals on "If We Never Meet Again This Side of Heaven"
- Gerry Teifer – background whistling on "Shine On Harvest Moon"
- Beachy Thompson – background whistling on "If We Never Meet Again This Side of Heaven"
- Al Cohn – horn arrangements on "Crazy Blues", "Mr. Jelly Roll Baker" and "Diddy Wah Diddy"
- William S. Fischer – string arrangements on "Mississippi Delta Blues", "Melancholy Baby" and "Shine On Harvest Moon"

Technical

- Joel Dorn – producer
- Hal Willner – associate producer
- Bob Liftin – recording and remix engineer
- Vince McGarry – additional recording and mastering engineer
- Neil Brody – additional recording engineer
- Benno Friedman – backliner photo
- Michael Horen and Leon Redbone – cover art

== Charts ==
Chart (1977)	Peak position
US Billboard 200	38
