= Nighthawks Orchestra =

New York City–based jazz band led by Vince Giordano

- Vince Giordano (right) leading the Nighthawks Orchestra, Birdland, 2025

Background information
- Genres: Jazz; early jazz
- Years active: 1976–present
- Members: Vince Giordano; Will Anderson; Dan Levinson; Mark Lopeman; Joe Boga; Jon-Erik Kellso; Sam Chess; Andy Stein; Devan Kortan; Peter Yarin; Paul Wells
- Website: www.vincegiordano.com

The Nighthawks Orchestra (Note: Also officially known as Vince Giordano & The Nighthawks or Vince Giordano's Nighthawks) is a New York City–based musical group that concentrates on recreations of the hot jazz and dance music styles from 1919 to the mid-1930s. Founded by the music historian Vince Giordano in 1976, he leads the ensemble and performs on tuba, double bass, and bass saxophone.

Recordings by the Nighthawks Orchestra have been featured in many television shows, radio broadcasts, and movies. Film scores that include the Nighthawks include The Aviator (2004) as well as pictures directed by Woody Allen, notably Sweet and Lowdown.

In 2012, the Nighthawks Orchestra was awarded a Grammy Award for Best Compilation Soundtrack for Visual Media, having contributed to the album Boardwalk Empire Volume 1: Music from the HBO Original Series for the HBO television series Boardwalk Empire.

== Personnel ==
Sources:

- Vince Giordano – bandleader; string bass, bass saxophone, tuba, vocals
- Will Anderson – alto saxophone, clarinet, soprano saxophone
- Dan Levinson – alto saxophone, clarinet, soprano saxophone
- Mark Lopeman – tenor saxophone, clarinet, soprano saxophone
- Joe Boga – trumpet
- Jon-Erik Kellso – trumpet
- Sam Chess – trombone
- Andy Stein – violin, phono-fiddle, baritone saxophone
- Devan Kortan – guitar, banjo
- Peter Yarin – piano
- Paul Wells – percussion

== Gallery ==
The Nighthawks performing in the Main Concourse of Grand Central Terminal for its centennial celebration, New York City, 2013
