= Dan Levinson =

American jazz clarinetist and bandleader (born 1965)

- Levinson in 1995

Background information
- Born: Daniel A. Levinson; July 8, 1965 (age 61); Los Angeles County, California, U.S.
- Genres: Jazz; early jazz
- Occupations: Musician; bandleader
- Instruments: Clarinet; saxophone
- Member of: Nighthawks Orchestra
- Formerly of: Leon Redbone
- Website: www.danlevinson.com

Daniel A. Levinson (born July 8, 1965) is an American jazz clarinetist, saxophonist, and bandleader. He is best known for his mastery of the jazz styles of the 1910s, 1920s, and 1930s.

Born in Los Angeles County, California, Levinson was a member of Leon Redbone's band, is a current member of Vince Giordano's Nighthawks Orchestra, and leads multiple bands of his own groups, mostly in the New York City metropolitan area.

== Discography ==
=== As sideman ===
- 2017: The Unheard Artie Shaw (Hep)
