= Boardwalk Empire Volume 3: Music from the HBO Original Series =

Soundtrack album by Various artists
- Released: October 27, 2014
- Label: ABKCO
- Producers: Stewart Lerman, Randall Poster

Boardwalk Empire Volume 3: Music from the HBO Original Series is a soundtrack for the HBO television series Boardwalk Empire, released on October 27, 2014. It features music heard in seasons 4 and 5 of the show. The album peaked at number ten on the Billboard Top Jazz Albums chart.

== Track listing ==
No.	Title	Performed by	Length
1.	"I Surrender Dear"	Elvis Costello	3:31
2.	"Love Me Or Leave Me"	Regina Spektor	3:03
3.	"The Peanut Vendor"	Pedrito Martinez	3:37
4.	"Where the Blue of the Night (Meets the Gold of the Day)"	Loudon Wainwright III	2:58
5.	"I'm a Little Blackbird"	Margot Bingham	3:16
6.	"Tiger Rag"	Johnny Gale, Little Isidore, & Buzz Garland	1:57
7.	"I Wish I Could Shimmy Like My Sister Kate"	JD McPherson	2:32
8.	"Choo Choo"	Vince Giordano & the Nighthawks	2:49
9.	"Farewell Daddy Blues"	Margot Bingham & David Mansfield	3:12
10.	"Out of Nowhere"	Marshall Crenshaw	4:26
11.	"What Is It"	Vince Giordano & the Nighthawks	5:28
12.	"Down in the Jungle Town"	Vince Giordano & the Nighthawks	2:58
13.	"Son Que Quita Las Pesas"	David Oquendo	1:57
14.	"The Yodeling Chinaman"	Stephen DeRosa	2:56
15.	"There Ain't No Sweet Man"	David Johansen, Johnny Gale, & Little Isidore	3:30
16.	"Don't Mind the Rain"	Angela McCluskey	3:04
17.	"(I'm a Dreamer) Aren't We All"	Johnny Gale & Little Isidore	3:32
18.	"Dream a Little Dream of Me"	Margot Bingham	4:16
19.	"If You Want the Rainbow (You Must Have the Rain)"	Norah Jones	3:31
Total length:			1:02:33

Track listing adapted from AllMusic.
