= Yardbird Suite (jazz club) =

Yardbird Suite is a jazz club located at 11 Tommy Banks Way in Edmonton, Alberta. Operating since 1957, it is one of Canada's oldest jazz clubs. It has features local national and international artist and averages 130 concert events each season, a season. The Yardbird hosts weekly Tuesday night jam sessions, sponsors the Littlebirds Big Band, presents Jazz For Kids events, and hosts the Yardbird Festival of Canadian Jazz. All while providing rehearsal space for some of Edmonton's top musicians. Many live albums have been recorded at the club.

== History ==
The first incarnation of the Yardbird Suite opened on 23 March 1957 on Whyte Avenue. The club was started by Edmonton musicians Terry Hawkeye, Zen and Ray Magus, Ron Repka, Garry Nelson, Ken Chaney and Neil Gunn. The original club moved two times before closing in 1967.

In 1973 the Edmonton Jazz Society was founded and carried on the Yardbird Suite at the current location of 11 Tommy Banks Way. Since that time the venue has run continuously, making it one of Canada's longest-running jazz venues.

== Locations ==
- 10444 Whyte Avenue (1957-1958)
- 9801 Jasper Avenue (1959-1966)
- 10122 81 Avenue North West (1967)
- 11 Tommy Banks Way (1984–present)

== Live recordings ==
- The Three Deuces - Keep on It (1996)
- Bert Seagar - Live at the Yardbird Suite (2008)
- Champian Fulton - Change Partners (2014)
