= Vince Giordano =

American musician and bandleader (born 1952)

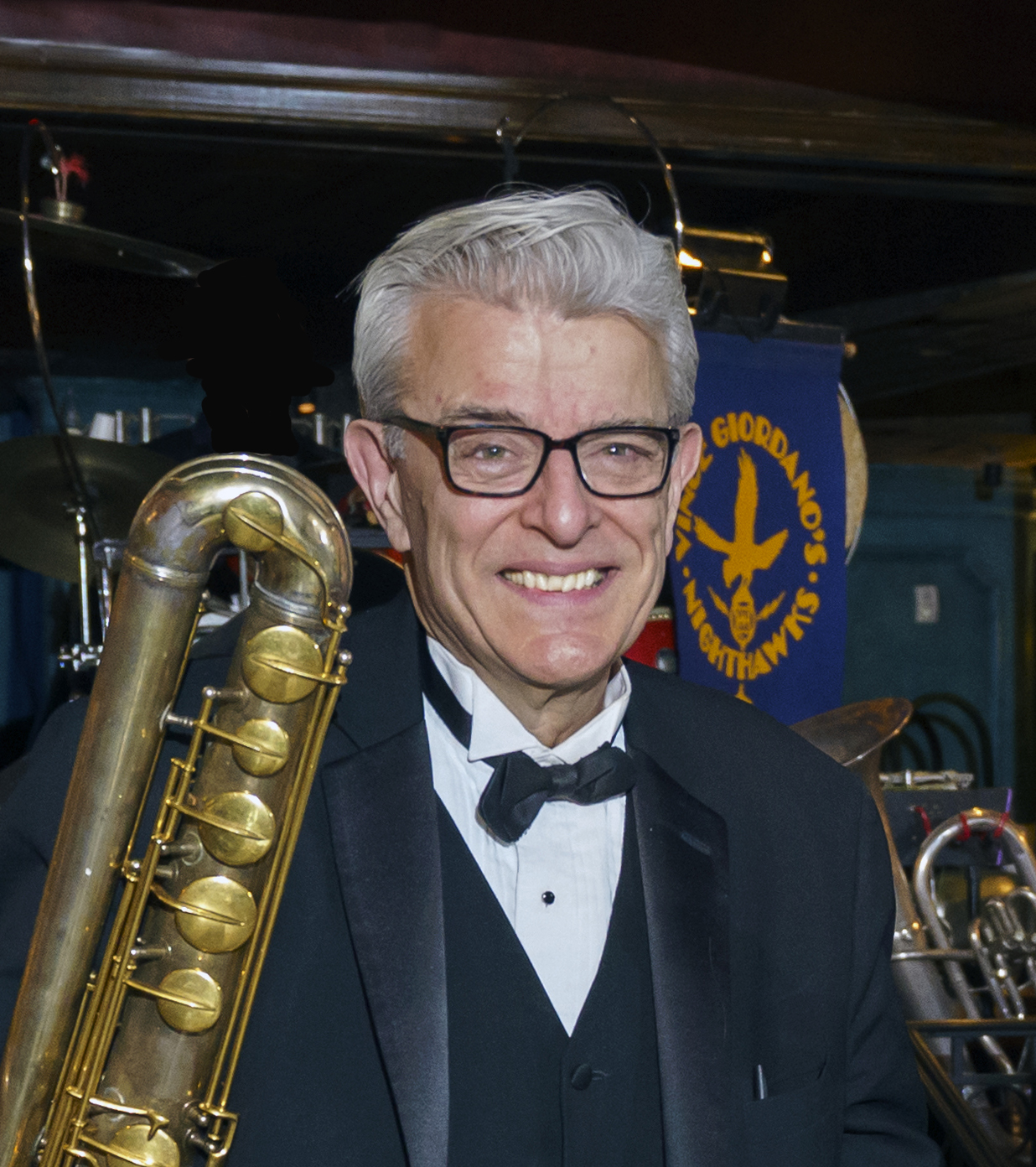
- Giordano at the Carmel International Film Festival in 2022

Background information
- Born: Vincent James Giordano; March 11, 1952 (age 74); Brooklyn, New York, U.S.
- Genres: Jazz; early jazz
- Occupations: Musician; music historian; bandleader; arranger
- Instruments: String bass; bass saxophone; tuba; vocals
- Years active: 1966–present
- Member of: Nighthawks Orchestra
- Website: www.vincegiordano.com

Vince Giordano (born March 11, 1952) is an American jazz musician, music historian, and leader of the New York City–based Nighthawks Orchestra. He specializes in jazz of the 1920s and 1930s and his primary instrument is the bass saxophone. Giordano and the Nighthawks have played on television and film soundtracks, including the HBO series Boardwalk Empire and Woody Allen's musical comedy film Everyone Says I Love You.

He also appeared in the 2023 film Killers of the Flower Moon as a radio show bandleader.

== Music career ==
Giordano was born in Brooklyn. At age five, he listened to music of the 1920s on a wind-up Victrola phonograph. When he was age 15, he played string bass and bass saxophone professionally and took lessons from Bill Challis to learn how to write arrangements like the dance bands of the 1920s and '30s. He performed with the New Paul Whiteman Orchestra, the Bix Beiderbecke Memorial Jazz Band, the New York Jazz Repertory Company, and Leon Redbone. He plays bass saxophone, string bass, tuba, and sings with his band, the Nighthawks Orchestra, which plays music from the early days of jazz, such as compositions by Jelly Roll Morton, Louis Armstrong, and Duke Ellington.

Giordano and the Nighthawks performing in the Main Concourse of Grand Central Terminal for its centennial celebration, New York City, 2013

Lending his musical and acting talents to Francis Ford Coppola's film The Cotton Club led to working with Dick Hyman's Orchestra in half a dozen Woody Allen soundtracks, then acting as bass player, most notably in Sean Penn's band in Allen's Sweet and Lowdown. Giordano and the Nighthawks have appeared on soundtracks for the movies The Aviator, Finding Forrester, The Good Shepherd, and Public Enemies, the HBO mini-series Mildred Pierce, and the HBO series Boardwalk Empire.

== Collecting ==
Giordano is a music historian and collector with over 60,000 scores in his collection. He is listed as "a friend of Thornton Hagert and the Vernacular Music Research's archive of music" in The Devil's Horn: The Story of the Saxophone by Michael Segall (2006). In 2011, he was featured in the PBS series Michael Feinstein's American Songbook, in which he reveals his treasures from the Great American Songbook. His collection includes big band arrangements, silent film scores, 78 rpm discs, piano rolls, and a Victrola phonograph.

== Performing ==
Giordano and his band have been guests on Garrison Keillor's variety radio show, A Prairie Home Companion. The Turner Classic Movies Film Festival spotlighted him at Hollywood's Music Box, where the band performed vintage movie music, in addition to accompanying The Cameraman, a Buster Keaton silent film shown at the Egyptian Theater. In the summer of 2012, the band performed at the Newport Jazz Festival, Music Mountain, and the Litchfield Jazz Festival. In 2016, the feature-length documentary There's a Future in the Past, about Giordano and his band, was released.

== Awards and honors ==
- Grammy Award for Best Compilation Soundtrack for Visual Media, Boardwalk Empire Volume 1: Music from the HBO Original Series, 2012

== Selected discography ==
- Quality Shout (Stomp Off, 1993)
- The Goldkette Project (Circle, 1994)
- Music of the Cotton Club Revisited (Nighthawk, 2001)
- Remembering Louis (Jump, 2002)
- Cheek to Cheek (Nighthawk, 2003)
- Moonlight Serenade – Big Band Hits of the 1930s & '40s (Nighthawk, 2006)
- Top Hat, White Tie & Tails

Soundtrack appearances

- 1994: Baseball: The American Epic
- 1996: Everyone Says I Love You
- 2001: Ghost World
- 2005: The Aviator
- 2006: George M. Cohan Tonight!
- 2006: The Good Shepherd
- 2011: Mildred Pierce: Music from the HBO Miniseries
- 2011: Boardwalk Empire Volume 1: Music from the HBO Original Series
- 2013: Boardwalk Empire Volume 2: Music from the HBO Original Series
- 2014: Boardwalk Empire Volume 3: Music from the HBO Original Series
- 2015: Bessie: Music from the HBO Film
- 2016: Cafe Society
- 2016: Battlefield 1
- 2023: Killers of the Flower Moon

With Leon Redbone

- 1978: Champagne Charlie
- 1981: From Branch to Branch
- 1985: Red to Blue
- 1991: Sugar
- 1992: Up a Lazy River
- 1994: Whistling in the Wind
- 2001: Any Time

With Marty Grosz

- 1996: The Rhythm for Sale
- 2002: Remembering Louis
- 2005: Chasin' the Spots
- 2006: Marty Grosz and His Hot Combination
- 2009: Hot Winds: The Classic Sessions
- 2012: The James P. Johnson Songbook

With the Back Bay Ramblers

- 1994: My Mamma's in Town!
- 2001: Cuttin' Up
- 2003: Red Hot Band

With others

- 1986: Chicago Jazz Summit, Chicago Jazz Summit
- 1990: Guy Van Duser, Get Yourself a New Broom (and Sweep Those Blues Away)
- 1993: Silver Leaf Jazz Band, Jelly's Last Jam
- 1994: Jazz Hot Ensemble, Jazz Hot Ensemble
- 1994: Keith Ingham, The Keith Ingham New York 9, Vol. 1
- 1994: Keith Ingham, The Keith Ingham New York 9, Vol. 2
- 1997: New Jazz Wizards, Play the Music of Jelly Roll Morton
- 2001: Dave Van Ronk, Sweet & Lowdown
- 2001: Barbara Rosene, Deep Night
- 2002: Paul Bacon, Things Are Looking Up
- 2003: Paragon Ragtime Orchestra, Black Manhattan: Theater and Dance Music of James Rick Benjamin
- 2003: Bix Beiderbecke Centennial All Stars, Celebrating Bix!
- 2003: Stormy Weather: The Music of Harold Arlen
- 2004: Andy Stein, Doin' Things
- 2004: Dick Hyman, If Bix Played Gershwin
- 2004: Cole Porter, It's De Lovely – The Authentic Cole Porter Collection
- 2006: Guess Who's in Town, Daryl Sherman
- 2006: McNally's Row Of Flats – Irish American Songs of Old New York by Harrigan and Braham, Mick Moloney
- 2007: Lower Register: Bobby Gordon Plays Joe Marsala, Bobby Gordon
- 2009: Mick Moloney, If It Wasn't for the Irish and the Jews
- 2009: Lew Green and Joe Muranyi, Together
- 2020: Loudon Wainwright III, I'd Rather Lead a Band

== See also ==
- Nighthawks Orchestra
- List of jazz arrangers
