= Chenille Sisters =

American contemporary folk band

The Chenille Sisters, an American contemporary folk band, includes singer Grace Morand, guitarist and songwriter Connie Huber, and singer-songwriter Cheryl Dawdy. They formed in 1985, when Dawdy joined Morand and Huber, who had been performing together at The Old Town in Ann Arbor, Michigan. Their name comes from chenille fabric which they described as "cozy and homespun and comfortable".

They originally signed with Red House Records in 1987, but eventually created their own label, Cantoo Records, in 1996.

== Discography ==
- The Chenille Sisters (1986)
- At Home with the Chenille Sisters (1989)
- 1,2,3 for Kids (children's album) (1990)
- Mama I Wanna Make Rhythm (1991)
- The Big Picture and Other Songs for Kids (children's album) (1992)
- Whatcha Gonna Swing Tonight (with the James Dapogny Chicago Band) (1992)
- True to Life (1994)
- Haute Chenille: A Retrospective (1995)
- Teaching Hippopotami To Fly (children's album) (1996)
- In the Christmas Spirit (2000)
- Room to Breathe (2002)
- May I Suggest (2006)
