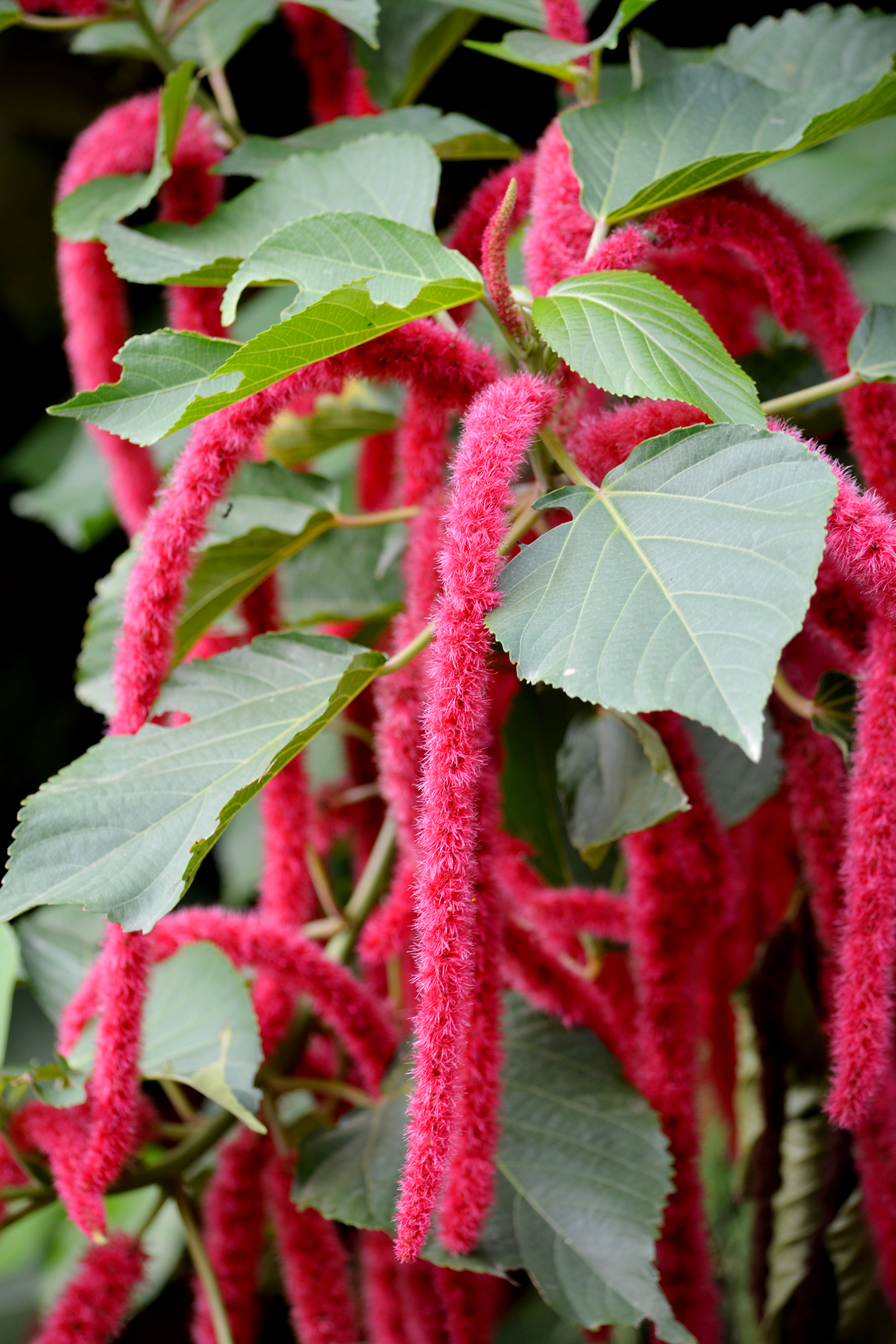

Scientific classification
- Kingdom: Plantae
- Clade: Tracheophytes
- Clade: Angiosperms
- Clade: Eudicots
- Clade: Rosids
- Order: Malpighiales
- Family: Euphorbiaceae
- Genus: Acalypha
- Species: A. hispida

Binomial name
- Acalypha hispida Burm.f.

= Acalypha hispida =

Chenille plant

Flowering shrub

Acalypha hispida, the chenille plant, is a flowering shrub which belongs to the family Euphorbiaceae, the subfamily Acalyphinae, and the genus Acalypha. Acalypha is the fourth largest genus of the family Euphorbiaceae, and contains many plants native to Oceania.

== Names ==
Acalypha hispida is also known as Philippine medusa and red hot cat tail in English. It is cultivated as a house plant because of its attractiveness and brilliantly colored, furry flowers.

The Latin specific epithet hispida means “bristly”, referring to the pendent flowers which vaguely resemble brushes.

== Origins ==
The plant originated in tropical Asia, specifically Malesia and Papuasia, but has become naturalized to multiple countries in North America, including the United States, Mexico, Nicaragua and Belize. In cultivation it is widespread, particularly as a houseplant, and has gained the Royal Horticultural Society's Award of Garden Merit.

== Description ==
It can grow to be 5–12 feet (1.5–3.7 m) tall, and have a spread of 3–6 feet (0.91–1.83 m), with potted plants being the smallest in growth. The plant has become somewhat domesticated, due to the nature and color of its flowers. It can be grown from seeds as well as from cuttings. It can be kept either as an outdoor plant or as a houseplant.

The plant is dioecious, and therefore there are distinct male and female members of the species. The female plant bears pistillate flowers which are 0.7 millimeters long and range in color from purple to bright red, and grow in clusters along catkins that can grow up to fifty centimeters (19.5 inches) or more in length. This feature is the primary reason the plant bears the nickname “red-hot cat tail”. The pistillates will grow all year long as long as the temperatures are favorable. The leaves are large, oval and bright green to reddish copper.

== Cultivation ==
When grown as a house plant, it needs bright light but not direct sunlight, and requires high humidity and a temperature of at least 61 °F (16 °C). It should be grown in a loose potting soil, rich in organic matter and sand, and must be kept well-watered during the spring and summer. Watering should be reduced somewhat in fall and winter. It is typically propagated from cuttings.

== Chemistry ==
The clear latex is poisonous and can irritate the skin and mucous membranes (signs of intoxication do not appear until massive amounts of plants have been absorbed). Roots, leaves and flowers are used for medical purposes. The plant itself is very resistant to diseases, but with a certain vulnerability to aphids, which can colonise it and bring it to death.

== Galleries ==
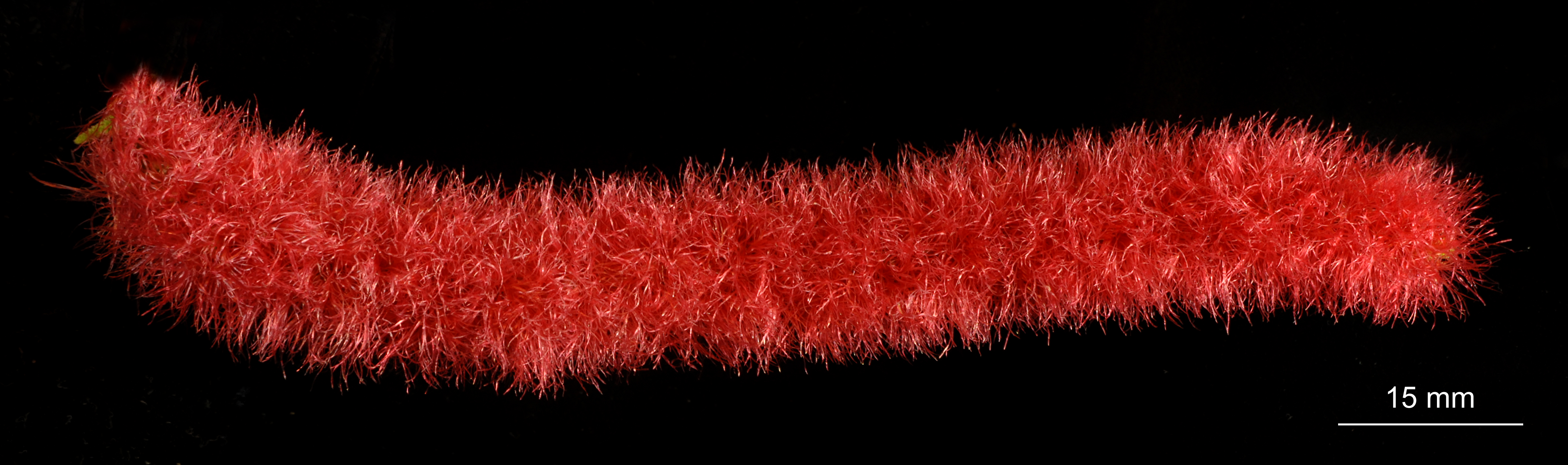
Inflorescence

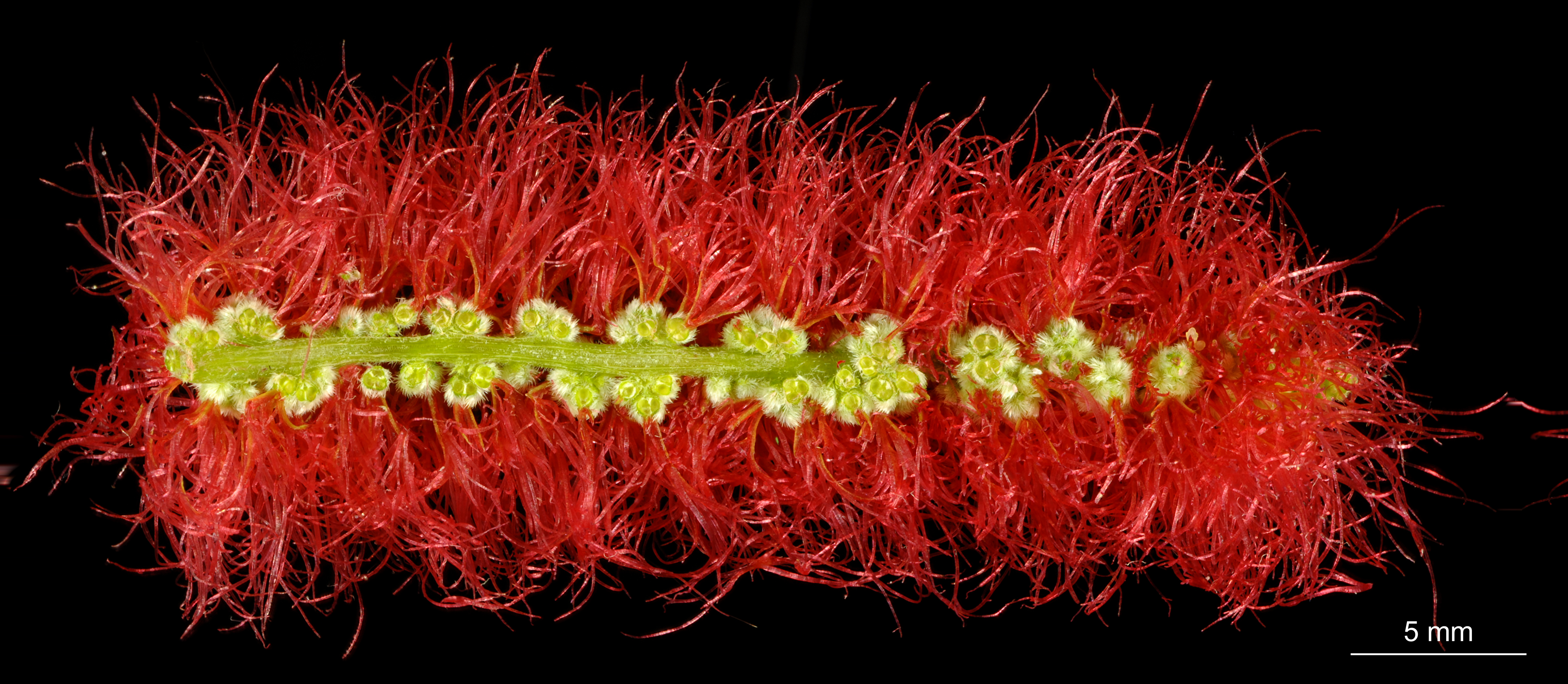
Longitudinal section

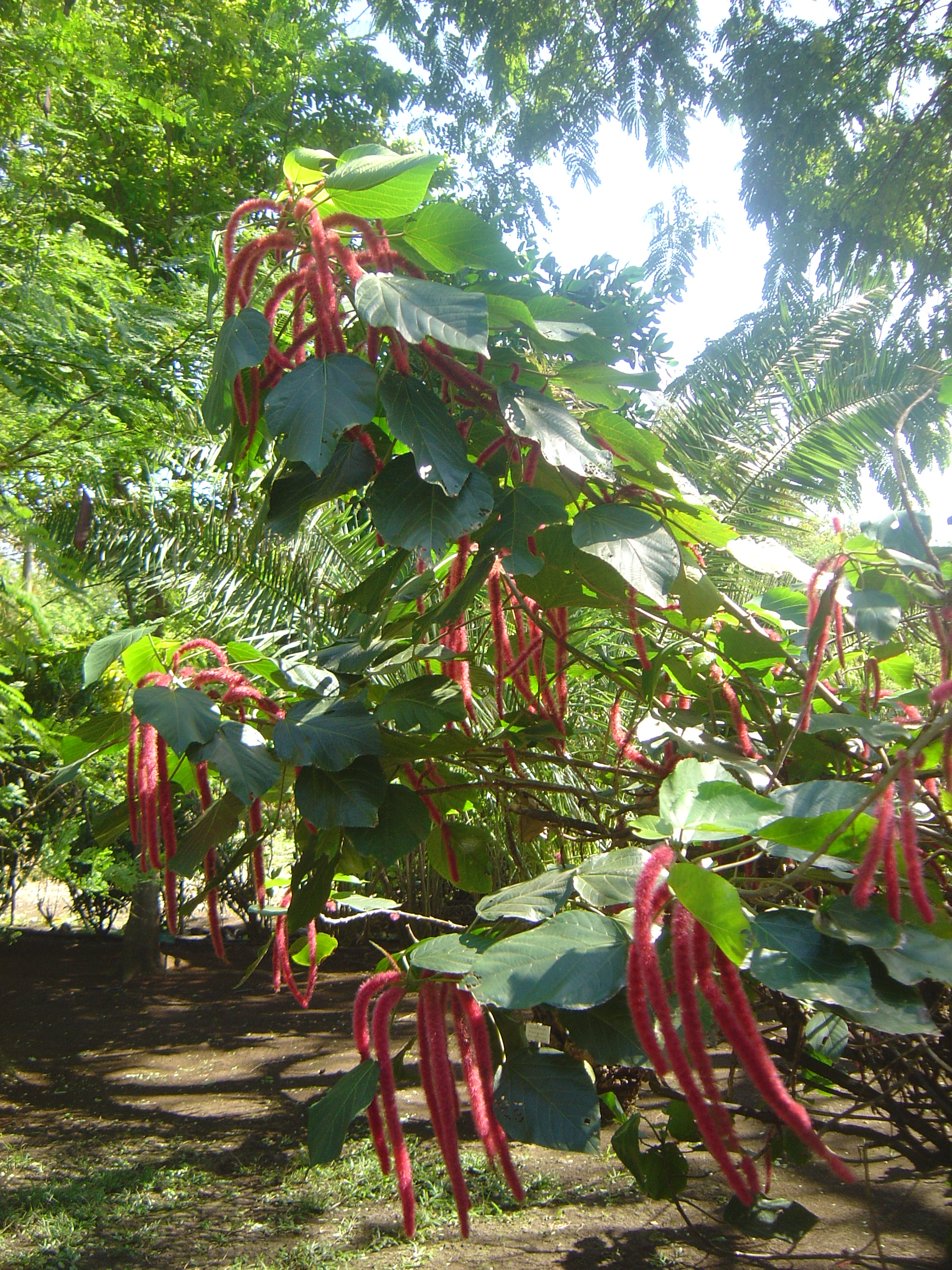
A shrub in Reunion Island
