= Litchfield Jazz Festival =

Annual jazz festival in Connecticut (founded 1996)

Coordinates: 41.7269°N 73.4821°W

The Litchfield Jazz Festival began in 1996 at the White Memorial Conservation Center in Litchfield Hills in Connecticut. The parent organization that runs the festival is Litchfield Performing Arts, Inc, a not-for-profit founded in 1981. After two years at the White Memorial Conservation Center the festival moved to the Goshen Fairgrounds in Goshen, Connecticut, where it was held until 2008. The festival moved to the grounds of Kent School in Kent, Connecticut in 2009, and was held there until 2011. In 2012 the festival returned to the Goshen Fairgrounds in Goshen, CT.

== About the festival ==
The Litchfield Jazz Festival is held in early August each summer. There is an opening night gala, three days of jazz, a juried craft show, a variety of food vendors, performances on a second stage by students from the Litchfield Jazz Camp, a kid's craft corner, an Artist Talk Tent where the Artist-in-Residence leads interviews, and MC's clinics by festival stars. There are also afterparties and jam sessions at local restaurants which are free and open to the public. The Main Stage performances are held under a large tent. There is seating under the tent as well as outdoors on the lawn.

== Past performers ==
Over the years the Litchfield Jazz Festival has presented legends like Dave Brubeck, Tito Puente, Ray Charles, Dr. John, the Heath Brothers, and Slide Hampton as well as introduced new talent and fostered the careers of Diana Krall, Brad Mehldau, Jane Monheit, Matt Wilson, Don Braden, Robert Glasper, and many others.

== Litchfield Jazz Camp ==
The Litchfield Jazz Camp began in 1997. The camp has been featured in TIME Magazine, on CNN and in the JazzTimes Education Guide. Litchfield Jazz camp offers students of all ages and abilities the opportunity to study with internationally recognized jazz musicians on the campus of a Connecticut boarding school. Students learn in an intensive, noncompetitive environment, in courses ranging from one to four weeks. Students work in skill-matched combos, both at the camp and on the Gazebo Stage at the Litchfield Jazz Festival.

Litchfield Jazz Camp’s music director is tenor saxophonist Don Braden. He and resident artists guide students through classes in performance, improvisation, jazz history, rhythm and percussion, music theory, the business of music, and composition. Instruction is offered in voice, piano, guitar, bass, drums, Latin rhythms, saxophones, clarinet, flute, and brass. Evening jam sessions and resident and visiting artist concerts add to the course work.

On festival weekend students receive instruction from Litchfield Jazz Festival performers. These have included Toots Thielemans, Sonny Rollins, Tom Harrell, Bill Charlap, Kenny Werner, Kenny Rankin, Stanley Turrentine, Paquito D’Rivera, James Moody, Danilo Perez, Jane Monheit, and Béla Fleck.
