= Leon Redbone =

Musician, songwriter, arranger, producer (1949–2019)

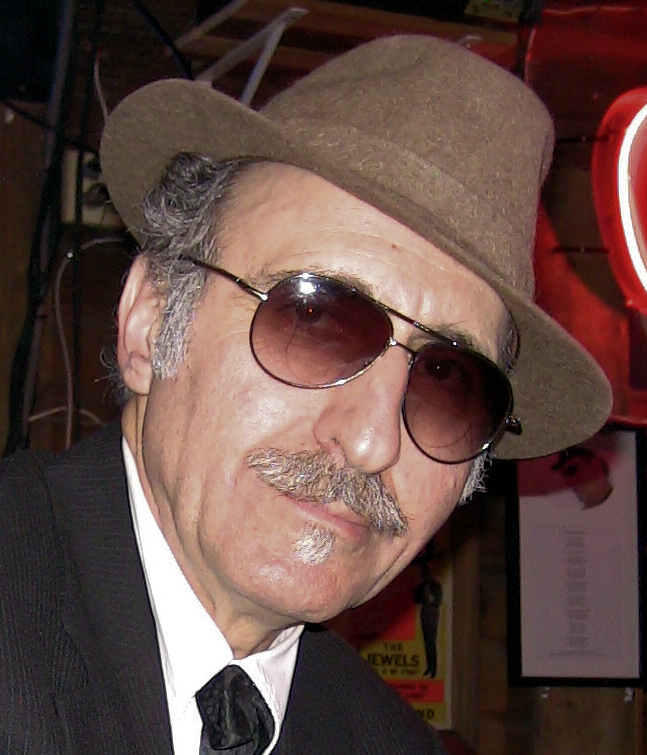
- Redbone in 2010

Background information
- Born: Dickran Gobalian; August 26, 1949; Nicosia, British Cyprus
- Died: May 30, 2019 (aged 69) New Hope, Pennsylvania, U.S.
- Genres: Vaudeville; ragtime; jazz; blues
- Occupations: Musician, singer, songwriter
- Instruments: Guitar, vocals
- Years active: Late 1960s–2015
- Labels: August; Warner Bros.; Atco; Sugar Hill; Blue Thumb; Rounder; A&M; Private Music; Third Man; Rhino; Green Stone
- Website: leonredbone.com

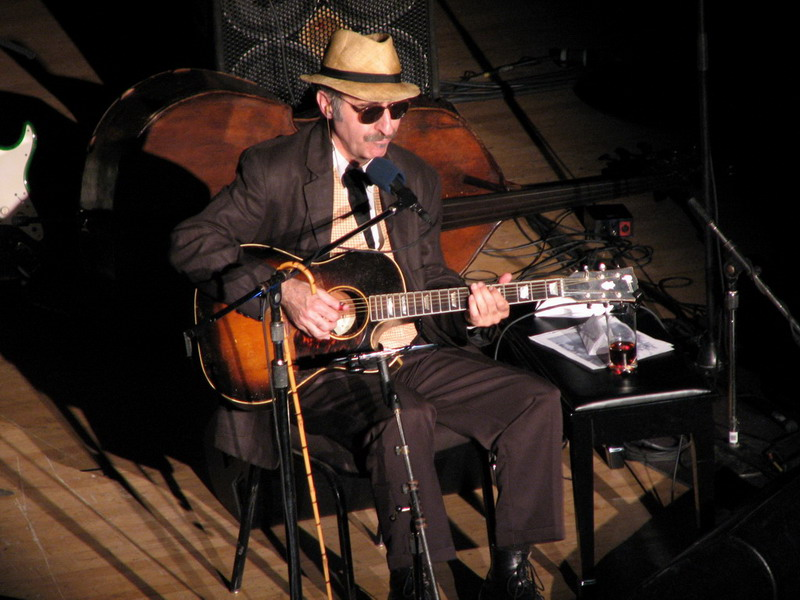
Redbone at Massey Hall, Toronto, Canada in 2007

Leon Redbone (born Dickran Gobalian; August 26, 1949 – May 30, 2019) was a singer-songwriter and musician specializing in jazz, blues, and Tin Pan Alley classics. Recognized by his hat (often a Panama), dark sunglasses, and black tie, he was born in Cyprus of Armenian ancestry and first appeared on stage in Toronto, Canada, in the early 1970s. He also appeared on film and television in acting and voice-over roles.

In concert, Redbone often employed comedy and demonstrated his guitar-playing skill. His recurrent gags involved the influence of alcohol and claims he had written works originating well before he was born. He favored music of the Tin Pan Alley era, circa 1890–1910. He sang the theme to the 1980s television series Mr. Belvedere, and released 18 albums.

== Early life ==
Redbone was elusive about his origins, and he never explained the origin of his stage name. According to a Toronto Star report in the 1980s, he came to Canada in the mid-1960s and changed his name via the Ontario Change of Name Act. Biographical research published in 2019 corroborated his birth name and confirmed that his family was of Armenian origin.

== Career ==
While living in Canada in the late 1960s, Redbone began performing in public at Toronto area nightclubs and folk music festivals. He met Bob Dylan at the Mariposa Folk Festival in 1972. Dylan was so impressed by Redbone's performance that he mentioned it in a Rolling Stone interview, leading that magazine to do a feature article on Redbone a year before he had a recording contract. The article described his performances as "so authentic you can hear the surface noise [of an old 78 rpm]." Dylan said that if he had ever started a label, he would have signed Redbone. Redbone's first album, On the Track, was released by Warner Bros. Records in 1975.

He was introduced to a larger public as a semi-regular musical guest on NBC's Saturday Night Live, appearing twice in the first season. During the 1980s and 1990s he was a frequent guest on The Tonight Show Starring Johnny Carson. He was also a guest on A Prairie Home Companion.

A self-taught musician, he played by ear, sometimes changing the chords of established tunes, never rehearsing with a band, and not following set lists. In an interview in the Winter 2017 edition (No. 177) of BING magazine, the publication of the International Club Crosby, clarinetist Dan Levinson recounted working with Redbone:

I toured with Redbone for 12 years. We used to listen to early Crosby while we were on the road. [Redbone's] taste in music was more eclectic than that of anyone I've ever known – it included Emmett Miller, Blind Blake, Paganini, Caruso, Gene Austin, John McCormack, Moran and Mack, Cliff Edwards, Jelly Roll Morton, Ted Lewis, Mustafa the Castrato, the Hungarian singer Imre Laszlo, Jimmie Rodgers ('the Singing Brakeman'), Mongolian throat singers, W. C. Fields, Laurel and Hardy ... and early Bing Crosby.

Redbone was described as "both a musical artist and a performance artist whose very identity was part of his creative output." He usually dressed in attire reminiscent of the Vaudeville era, performing in a Panama hat with a black band and dark sunglasses, often while sitting at attention on a stool, with a white coat and trousers and a black string tie. With his reluctance to discuss his past came speculation that "Leon Redbone" was an alternative identity for another performer. Two common suggestions in years past were Andy Kaufman and Frank Zappa, both of whom Redbone outlived. Though sometimes compared to Zappa and Tom Waits for "the strength and strangeness of his persona", he almost exclusively played music from decades before the rock era, occasionally writing his own new material in a similar blues-influenced Tin Pan Alley style. (As well, Redbone's only Billboard chart hit, "Seduced", was a newly written tune by Gary Tigerman arranged in Redbone's decades-old style.) Redbone disdained "blatant sound for people to dance to", and in a 1991 interview, he said: "The only thing that interests me is history, reviewing the past and making something out of it."

Redbone survived a small plane crash in Clarksburg, West Virginia, on February 12, 1979. He thereafter traveled to engagements exclusively by car, saying, "I carry around many unusual items and devices. They make life difficult for airport security personnel and flying impossible for me." It is unknown how he made the round trip to record his concert in Paris on October 26, 1992 at the Olympia Theater; by ship, or by making an exception to his "no fly" policy.

On May 19, 2015 on his website, his publicist referred to concerns about his health and announced his retirement from performing and recording.

== Death ==
Redbone died on May 30, 2019, from the effects of dementia. At the time he was living in New Hope, Pennsylvania, in hospice care. He was survived by his wife Beryl Handler, daughters Blake and Ashley, and three grandchildren.

A statement on Redbone's website noted his death with cheeky humor: "It is with heavy hearts we announce that early this morning, May 30, 2019, Leon Redbone crossed the delta for that beautiful shore at the age of 127. He departed our world with his guitar, his trusty companion Rover, and a simple tip of his hat." His longtime publicist Jim Della Croce confirmed that Redbone was actually 69.

== Appearances in other media ==
One of Redbone's songs, "Seduced", was featured prominently in the 1978 film The Big Fix. He sang "Baby, It's Cold Outside" with Zooey Deschanel over the closing credits of the 2003 film Elf and provided the voice of Leon the Snowman in the film. He performed the theme songs for the TV shows Mr. Belvedere and Harry and the Hendersons.

Redbone appeared regularly on the PBS children's show Between the Lions. On Sesame Street, he sang several songs over film footage, including "Blueberry Mouth", "Have You Ever", and "What Do They Do When They Go Wherever They Go?" He also appeared as Leon in the 1988 film Candy Mountain, and on an episode of the TV show Life Goes On. He narrated the 2011 Emmy Award-winning documentary Remembering the Sirens, celebrating the exceptional, yet little-known musical legacy of the Scranton Sirens, one of the most significant "territory" dance bands in American musical history.

He performed in TV commercials for various companies, including Budweiser beer (where he lay on a surfboard singing "This Bud's for You"), the U.S. automobile brand Geo, All laundry detergent, and InterCity British Rail service (where he sang the song "Relax"). He also lent his voice to an animated caricature of himself in a commercial for Ken-L Ration dog food.

Redbone was the subject of the 2018 short documentary film Please Don't Talk About Me When I'm Gone by Mako Funasaka, Liam Romalis and Jason Charters, produced by Riddle Films.

== Discography ==
=== Studio albums ===
- On the Track (Warner Bros., 1975)
- Double Time (Warner Bros., 1977)
- Champagne Charlie (Warner Bros., 1978)
- From Branch to Branch (Emerald City / Atco, 1981)
- Red to Blue (August, 1986)
- No Regrets (Sugar Hill, 1988)
- Christmas Island (August, 1988)
- Sugar (August / Private Music, 1990)
- Up a Lazy River (August / Private Music, 1992)
- Whistling in the Wind (August / Private Music, 1994)
- Any Time (August / Blue Thumb, 2001)
- Flying By (August, 2014)
- Long Way from Home: Early Recordings (Third Man, 2016). Features 8 live tracks recorded live at the S.U.N.Y. Buffalo coffee house and 10 tracks recorded live in the studio at WBFO radio, Buffalo, New York.

=== Live albums ===
- Mystery Man (Accord, 1982)
- Leon Redbone Live (Green Stone, 1985, also released as Live!, Pair Records, 1991, as Live & Kickin', Purple Pyramid / Cleopatra, 1999, Master Classics Records, 2004, and as If We Ever Meet Again, Concert Archive-Delta-Special Markets, 2021.) Some releases have incorrect song titles for certain performances including "Bootleg Rum Dum Blues" (as "Whiskey"), "Skeedle Loo Doo Blues" (as "That's All I Do"), and "Mamie's Blues" / "2:19" (as"2:17").
- Live – October 26, 1992: The Olympia Theater, Paris, France (Rounder, 2005)
- Strings & Jokes: Live in Bremen 1977 (MIG, 2018)
