= Tony Saunders (bassist) =

American bassist and synthesizer player (born 1955)

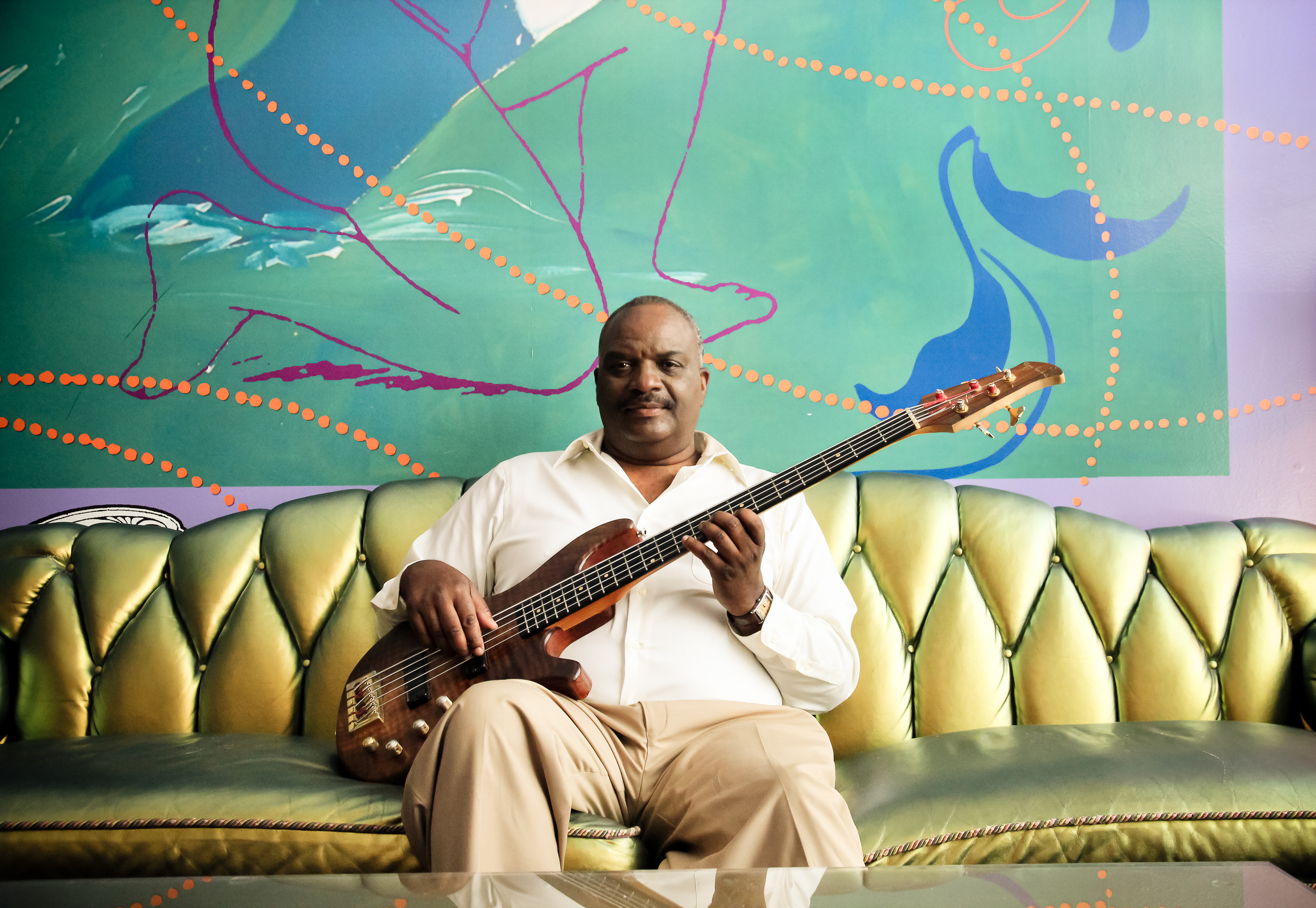
- Saunders in 2011

Background information
- Born: November 10, 1955 (age 70); San Francisco, California, U.S.
- Genres: Jazz; R&B; Gospel
- Occupations: Bassist, record producer and arranger.
- Instrument: Bass guitar
- Years active: 1970–present
- Labels: San Francisco Records, Baja/TSR Records
- Website: www.tonysaunders.com

Tony Saunders (born November 10, 1955) is an American bass and synthesizer player known for producing jazz, gospel, R&B, and pop music. He is also a composer, arranger, record producer, and founder of the Studio 1281 recording studio.

== Early life and education ==
Saunders was born in San Francisco, California, in 1955. Encouraged by his father, keyboardist Merl Saunders, he began singing at age five and later took piano lessons from musicians such as Herbie Hancock and Sly Stone. Saunders started playing bass at age fourteen, receiving his first bass from Tom Fogerty of Creedence Clearwater Revival.

Growing up, Saunders was influenced by musicians such as Eddie Moore, Jimmy Smith, Stanley Turrentine, Creedence Clearwater Revival, Sonny Rollins, Dewey Redman, George Duke, Al Jarreau, Bola Sete, and John Handy.

Saunders is a graduate of San Francisco Conservatory of Music, an institute of Music, and was awarded a fellowship in piano.

Saunders has two Emmy Awards; he earned his first Emmy at age fourteen, while collaborating with his father on the PBS documentary Soul Is. By the age of eighteen, he was performing with his father and Jerry Garcia, lead guitarist and co-founder of the rock band the Grateful Dead, at various shows. Saunders earned his second Emmy for an episode of Digital Journey titled "China: The Digital Economy".

== Career ==
Saunders’s career began by playing with his father and Jerry Garcia, becoming a featured musician in Merl Saunders & Aunt Monk when he was eighteen years old. Later, Saunders played in the original Rainforest Band and recorded all of his father's projects. Bassists Chuck Rainey, Jack Casady, and John Kahn were contemporaries of Saunders during this period. Kahn introduced Saunders to the music of James Jamerson. His other influences include Stanley Clarke, Alphonso Johnson, Rufus Reid, Ralphe Armstrong, and Marcus Miller. Anthony Davis and Lee Miles encouraged Saunders to play bass guitar full-time.

Saunders has made appearances in films, corporate videos, TV shows, and commercials. He also produced numerous CDs–primarily at his studio, Studio 1281. He composed the music for the stage play Zetta, which was performed in San Francisco by the American Conservatory Theater. He acted as the musical director for Zetta and Rock Justice, the latter written by Bob Heyman and Marty Balin of Jefferson Starship.

Saunders studied under choir director Leon Patillo. He played with Walter Hawkins, Edwin Hawkins, and the Love Center Choir in the 1980s and released He Lifted Me Up, his first gospel project, in 2005. Other gospel artists Saunders has played with include Andrae Crouch, the Clark Sisters, Reverend James Moore, Daryl Coley, James Cleveland, the Williams Brothers, The Mighty Clouds of Joy, and Shirley Caesar. He completed a gospel project featuring Derrick Hughes, Alfreda Lyons-Campbell, and Saunders's long-time friend, gospel bassist and drummer, Joel Smith (nephew of Walter and Edwin Hawkins).

Artists collaborating with him on projects have included Nils, Jeff Lorber, Paul Brown, Gail Johnson, Jeff Ryan, Marion Meadows, Mavis Staples, John Lee Hooker, and Austin "Auggie" Brown, the nephew of Michael Jackson. (Auggie's project was later sold to Midas Records). Saunders was hired as a staff producer for San Francisco Records. He had previously worked for the label's president, Ron Umile, when he was at Associated Booking in New York. Umile hired Saunders to work with Martha Reeves and Randy Crawford, among others. Saunders's first solo album, Bigger than Outside, was released in October 2011.

Saunders's second album, Appaloosa, was released on January 22, 2014, featuring Grammy Award winners Howard Hewett, Bill Champlin, and Tony Lindsay on vocals. Tom Politzer (from Tower of Power) and Rock Hendricks (from Paul Hardcastle's Jazzmasters series) performed saxophone on the CD. Fred Ross and Sakai, who were longtime friends of Saunders and background singers with the rock band Train, sang on the duet "The Question Is."

Saunders's third album for San Francisco Records, Uptown Jazz, featured Gabriel Mark Hasselbach, Rock Hendricks, Sakai, Paul Hardcastle Jr., and Gerald Albright. Saunders's single "Rock Steady" was a cover of The Whispers' 1980s hit and was produced in Atlanta by Magic Mendez. Harmony Blackwell, The Whispers' programmer/background vocalist, and Mendez sang the vocals. Mendez is also credited with layering the audio tracks.

His fourth album, Sexy Somethin', was released on February 21, 2020, on San Francisco Records, featuring Jeff Lorber, Marion Meadows, Paul Brown, Nils, Gail Johnson, Jeff Ryan, Ray Chew, and Paul Jackson Jr.

In 2021, Saunders signed to the label Baja/TSR Records and produced a new CD called All About Love.

His most recent release, The Romance Continues, was released in 2024 with 15 songs.

== Awards and honors ==
Saunders, who co-authored the video "Black Lives Matter" with Nona Brown, won a Telly Award in 2022. He has also received two Emmy Awards, and won the New York Film Festival's Grand and Silver Awards for educational compositions.

== Discography ==
=== Studio albums ===
- 2002: Whispering Waters – Tony Saunders/Paradise – arranger, producer, bass (electric, upright, six-string, five-string)
- 2005: He Lifted Me Up – Tony Saunders & the Anointed Voices – producer, composer, bass
- 2011: Romancing The Bass – Tony Saunders solo; CD
- 2014: Appaloosa – Tony Saunders solo; CD
- 2016: Uptown Jazz – Tony Saunders solo; CD
- 2019: Peace to the Planet – Rainforest Band – composer, bass
- 2020: Sexy Somethin' – Tony Saunders solo; CD
- 2021: All About Love – Tony Saunders solo; CD
- 2023: Good Medicine – Rainforest Band – composer, bass
- 2024: The Romance Continues – Tony Saunders solo; CD

=== As major contributor ===
- 2005: Peace to the Planet – Rain Forest Band – composer, bass
- 2005: He Lifted Me Up – Tony Saunders & the Anointed Voices
- 2021: Sweet Breeze – The Noteworthy Band – producer, composer, bass

=== Other contributions ===
Year	Artist	Album	Details
1969	The Man Child Singers	Right On / Mighty Whitey	Lead singer
1974	Merl Saunders	Merl Saunders	Bass
1976	Merl Saunders	You Can Keep Your Hat On	Bass
1976	David Liebman	Light'n Up, Please!	Bass
1977	Juice Newton & Silver Spur	Come to Me	Bass
1979	Marty Balin	Rock Justice	Cast recording, music director
1982	Edwin Hawkins Singers	Imagine Heaven	Clavinet, bass
1984	Combat 84	Death or Glory	Liner notes only
1988	Various artists	Do the Right Thing [Soundtrack]	Mixing, engineering
1990	The Family Stand	Chain	Mix assistant
1993	Jim Payne	Funk Drumming	
1994	Rev. James Moore	Brothers & Sisters I Will Be Praying for You	Bass
1995	Neal Schon	Beyond The Thunder	Bass (tracks 1, 3, 6)
1995	Lady Bianca	Best Kept Secret	Bass
1995	Various artists	Red Blooded Blues	Percussion
1995	Joe Louis Walker	Blues of the Month Club	Bass
1996	Various artists	Blue Gold	Bass
1997	Merl Saunders	Keepers	Bass
1997	Various artists	Takoma Eclectic Sampler	Bass
1998	Various artists	Every Woman's Blues: The Best of New Generation	Bass
1998	Merl Saunders & Rainforest Band	Fiesta Amazonica	Bass
1998	Larry Vann	Summertime in the Big City	Bass, arrangement, production, engineering, keyboard programming
1999	Fifty One Fifty	Illegally Insane	
1999	Various artists	Blues Routes: Heroes & Tricksters	Bass
1999	Ricardo Scales	Yes I'm Ready	Bass
2000	Various artists	Blues for a Rotten Afternoon	Bass
2001	Lady Bianca	Rollin'	Bass
2003	John Lee Hooker	Final Recordings 1	Organ, bass
2003	Loni Williams	Reason Why	Engineering, mixing
2003	Larry Vann	Rhythm & Roots of Larry Vann	Arrangement, bass guitar, keyboards, drum programming, keyboard programming
2003	Sweet Jimmie	Sweet Jimmie Sings the Blues	Bass
2004	John Lee Hooker	Face to Face	Organ, bass
2004	Rene	I Am Sorry	Bass, producer, vocal arrangement, drum programming, mixing
2004	Tony Saunders	The Unsung Soldier	
2004	Merl Saunders	Still Groovin'	Bass, keyboards, arrangement, production, mixing
2004	M.R.L.S.	Jazz Ala Soul	Arrangement, engineering, mixing, bass
2004	R&B All-Stars	Live! From San Francisco	Bass, arrangement, production, engineering, synthesizer programming, repair
2004	Juel Nero	Songs for My Three Mothers	Backing vocals, production
2005	Steven B.'s Heart Language	Songs for the Being Human	Bass, arrangement, vocals, backing vocals, production
2005	Automatic Pilot	Back From the Dead	Bass guitar, guest appearance
2005	Ayana	Sunlight of My People	Bass, engineering, mixing
2005	Patricia Wilder	Sweet Love	Synthesizer, bass, arrangement, keyboards, production, engineering, executive production, mixing
2006	II Big	In a Mendocino Town [Bonus Tracks]	Bass guitar, production, engineering, mixing, guest appearance
2007	II Big	Face in the Glass	Bass, producer, engineer, mixing, guest appearance
2007	James Levi	Knee Deep	Bass, keyboards, production, engineering
2008	Nikita Germaine	Just Kita	
2008	Ashling Cole	Sweet Feelings	
2008	Various artists	Cyril Magnin Street Fair	Group member
2008	We 3	Live at John's Grill	Bass (electric, upright, 6-String, 5-String), production, executive production, group member
2008	Ron Thompson and the Resistors	Magic Touch	Bass, engineering, mastering
2008	Hartfield Family	Paradise in the Valley	Synthesizer, bass, piano, arrangement, production, engineering, vocal arrangement, editing, drum programming, mixing, instrumentation
2008	Pastor Rodney G. McNab SR. / The Spiritual	St. Mark Baptist Church: 60th Anniversary	Bass guitar, production, engineering, executive production, horn arrangements, string arrangements
2011	Tony Saunders	Romancing The Bass	Production, engineering, bass, composition
2014	Tony Saunders	Appaloosa	Production, engineering, bass, composition
2016	Tony Saunders	Uptown Jazz	Production, engineering, bass, composition
2020	Tony Saunders	Sexy Somethin'	Production, engineering, bass, composition

== Filmography ==
- Rock Justice by Marty Balin (1979) – EMI (music director) (DVD released 2007)
- Peggy Sue Got Married (1986) – actor (in "The Four-Mations"), musical performer, songwriter
- CBS Schoolbreak Special: God, the Universe & Hot Fudge Sundaes – actor (role of Bailiff) (1986)
- Farmer & Chase – soundtrack (1995)
- Faith & Fear: The Children of Krishna – composer and musician (TV, 2001)
- Beginning Bass – Tony Saunders (Book and DVD, 2005)
- Writer's Day – Composer and foley artist (2005)
- Learning Bass Guitar – Tony Saunders and Rudy Sarzo (Book and DVD, 2007)

== Bibliography ==
- Learning Bass Guitar – Tony Saunders and Rudy Sarzo (2007)
- Beginning Bass – Tony Saunders (2005)
- Funk Drumming – Jim Payne (played on enclosed CD), Mel Bay Publications (April 1993) ISBN 0-87166-511-5, ISBN 978-0-87166-511-9
