= Condemned 84 =

English Oi! band

- Origin: Ipswich, Suffolk, England
- Genre: Oi!
- Years active: 1980–present
- Labels: Oi!, RFB, Grade 1, Link, Rock-O-Rama, Street Punk, Step-1, R 'n' B, Hammer, Hit, Dim, Haunted Town
- Members: Kev; Gunk; Mark; Mark Magee; Charlie
- Past members: Mick; Cliff; Baysey; Dave; Wayne; Chris Heath
- Website: www.condemned84.com

Condemned 84 are an English Oi! band. According to their website, the band was formed in 1980 as Criminal Tendencies, changing their name in 1983 to Condemned, and in 1984 to Condemned 84.

In 1986 one of their concerts turned into a riot. Earlier in the event there had been performances by several other Oi! bands, including The Business and Vicious Rumours, which drew a number of skinheads. Following the concert, some attendees attacked vendors, caterers and security staff. The concert itself had not been organized by Condemned 84.

They are often confused with their contemporaries Combat 84 due to the similar band names and both bands having released albums on the same label, Rock-O-Rama.

== Discography ==
As per the Condemned 84 official website:

=== Albums ===
- Battle Scarred (Oi! Records, 1986)
- Face the Aggression (Grade 1 Records, 1988)
- Live & Loud (Link Records, 1989)
- Storming to Power (Rock-O-Rama, 1992)
- Amongst the Thugs (Step-1 Music, 1995)
- Blood On Yer Face (R 'n' B Records, 1999)
- No One Likes Us... We Don't Care (Hit Records, 2004)
- In From the Darkness (Haunted Town Records, 2011)
- The Crusade Continues... (Askania Prod, 2023)

=== Singles and EPs ===
- 5-track Demo Tape Cassette (self released)
- Oi! Ain't Dead EP (RFB Records, 1986)
- In Search of the New Breed EP (RFB Records, 1987)
- Euro '96 EP (Grade 1 Records, 1995)
- "Bootboys" / "In Yer Face" - (Hammer Records, 1999)
- "Battle" / "No Way In" (Haunted Town Records, 2003)
- The Real Oi! EP (Haunted Town Records, 2011)
- "When They Stick The Knife In"/ "One In A Million Voices" 7" and cd. (P.S.T. Records, 2019)

=== Compilations ===
- The Boots Go Marching In (Rock-O-Rama, 1991)
- Battle Scarred/Live & Loud (Street Punk Records, 1993)
- The Best Of (Step-1 Music, 2005)
