= Apocalypse Now Redux (soundtrack) =

2001 film soundtrack album

Apocalypse Now Redux (Music from the Motion Picture Soundtrack)

Film score by Francis Ford Coppola, Carmine Coppola and Ed Golfarb
- Released: July 31, 2001
- Recorded: 1979–2001
- Venues: San Francisco; San Rafael; Los Angeles
- Studios: The Automatt; American Zoetrope Studios; Different Fur Studios; Club Front; CBS Studio Center
- Genres: Film score; electronic
- Length: 48:18
- Labels: Elektra; Nonesuch
- Producers: David Rubinson; Richard Beggs; Airto Moreira; Mike Hinton

Apocalypse Now Redux (Music from the Motion Picture Soundtrack) is the film score to the 2001 film Apocalypse Now Redux directed by Francis Ford Coppola which is the extended version to Apocalypse Now (1979). The album was released through Elektra and Nonesuch Records on July 31, 2001, and featured a remastered version of the 1979 film's original score composed by Francis and his late father Carmine Coppola, with Ed Golfarb providing cues for two deleted scenes.

== Background ==
Apocalypse Now was one of the first major films that utilized synthesizers as a central element of the score, produced by Francis' father and composer Carmine Coppola with Francis in his only stint as a composer arranging the cues. When Francis began working on Apocalypse Now Redux—an extensively revised and expanded "director's cut" of the original film—he further navigated on unique challenges as the music Carmine had composed for the deleted scenes were unfinished and the new cues had to sonically match the existing cues present in the 1970s, but information on which synths were sounds were either sketchy or nonexistent. Furthermore, Carmine died in 1991, hence he could not be consulted. Francis then turned to his longtime associate and San Francisco Bay Area-based musician Ed Goldfarb to work on the remaining cues.

Ed Goldfarb explained that he scored the new scenes for Apocalypse Now Redux using a surprisingly simple digital workflow. Goldfarb studied the existing music, production notes, manuscripts, and track sheets preserved in the Coppola archives. Using period-appropriate synthesizers and techniques, Goldfarb carefully recreated the sound palette of the 1979 score while composing and orchestrating music for newly restored scenes. His goal was not strict historical accuracy but to ensure that the new material sounded as though it naturally belonged in Apocalypse Now.

Instead of relying on traditional film-scoring equipment such as SMPTE systems, video decks, or synchronization hardware, he worked from video dubs and QuickTime files in Digital Performer, manually aligning audio and picture and creating his own synchronization markers. He emphasized that modern computer-based tools allowed him to compose, record, mix, and deliver scores entirely digitally, often without ever handling the original film reels, while maintaining perfect synchronization. Goldfarb further delivered stems for the final mix, and collaborated closely with Francis on the orchestration choices.

One of the biggest challenges was recreating specific sounds from the original score, particularly the synthesized timpani effects. Goldfarb analyzed vintage synthesizer techniques and programmed sounds layer by layer to achieve an authentic result. During the final mixing sessions, he was even required to create last-minute overdubs, including an analog-style harp patch, while working under pressure in front of Francis, Walter Murch, and other key members of the production team. Despite these challenges, he successfully blended the new material into the score that combined synthesizer orchestration, experimental percussion, rock guitar, and classical music.

== Release ==
The soundtrack was released through Elektra and Nonesuch Records on July 31, 2001. The album is published in CD and LP formats.

== Reception ==
Neil Shurley of AllMusic wrote "the music for Apocalypse Now Redux tends to sound dated and somewhat sterile, even while the recording itself is particularly crisp. Still, it's an interesting and welcome CD even if the "Love Theme" for one of the film's new scenes sticks out like a sore thumb and Mickey Hart's contributions with the Diga Rhythm Devils are all too brief." Critic based at Filmtracks felt that the new themes "Love Theme" and "Clean's Funeral" were "really out of place in this score and feature more accessible harmonics than the remainder of the work" where the former "on a lush bed of synths is an especially awkward diversion" and the latter "supplies more stoic ambience with military trumpet solos on top." He felt the score as a standalone album is "satisfying but expose strategic flaws in the music's narrative."

Roger Ebert stated that "Coppola also pushes the envelope with the remastered soundtrack". Ed Gonzalez of Slant Magazine called it "synth-laden score gives the film the tenor of a horror flick, and the rock anthems sporadically heard throughout suggest desperate gasps fighting to be heard through tides of change."

== Track listing ==
No.	Title	Artist(s)	Length
1.	"Opening – The End"	The Doors	6:29
2.	"The Delta"		2:41
3.	"Dossier"		2:09
4.	"Orange Light"		1:16
5.	"Ride of the Valkyries"	Richard Wagner	1:50
6.	"Suzie Q"	Dale Hawkins, Stanley J. Lewis and Eleanor Broadwater	3:23
7.	"Nung River"		2:44
8.	"Do Lung"		4:06
9.	"Letters From Home"		1:14
10.	"Clean's Death"		1:58
11.	"Clean's Funeral"		2:56
12.	"Love Theme"		3:06
13.	"Chief's Death"		1:50
14.	"Voyage"		3:08
15.	"Chef's Head"		1:54
16.	"Kurtz Chorale"		1:29
17.	"Finale"		6:05
Total length:			48:18

== Personnel ==
Credits adapted from liner notes:

- Music producer – David Rubinson
- Assistant music producer – Airto Moreira, Gian-Carlo Coppola, Michael Hinton
- Album producer – Richard Beggs
- Mixing – Richard Beggs
- Assistant mixing – Shirley Walker
- Mastering – Paul Stubblebine
- Additional mastering – Brian Sarvis
- Engineer – Betty Cantor-Jackson, Bill Steele, Bob Matthews, Brett Cohen, Charles Garsha, Dan Healy, Emil Flock, Jim Austin, Katharine Morton, Ken Kessie, Leslie Ann Jones, Phil Yeend, Richard Beggs, Stacy Baird, Steve Mantoani
- Guitar – Randy Hansen
- Percussion – Billy Kreutzmann, Greg Erricso, Jim Loveless, Jordan Amarantha, Phil Lesh, Zakir Hussain
- Lead synthesizer – Patrick Gleeson
- Synthesizer – Bernard L. Krause, Don Preston, Ed Goldfarb, Nyle Steiner, Richard Beggs, Shirley Walker
- Assistant synthesizer – Andy Narell
- Choir conductor – Carmine Coppola
- Vocals – Henrietta Davis, Jeannie Tracy, Sheila Ellis
- Production coordinator – Teresa Zaleska
- Copyist – Chris Poehler, George Annis
- Album cover – Bob Peak
- Photography – Chas Gerretsen, Josh Weiner
- Design – 27.12 Design
- Liner notes – Francis Ford Coppola
