= Ian Stuart Donaldson =

English neo-Nazi musician (1957–1993)

Background information
- Also known as: Ian Stuart
- Born: 11 August 1957; Poulton-le-Fylde, Lancashire, England
- Origin: Blackpool, Lancashire, England
- Died: 24 September 1993 (aged 36) Derbyshire, England
- Genres: White power rock; folk; punk rock; Oi!
- Occupations: Musician, singer, songwriter
- Instruments: Vocals, guitar
- Years active: 1975–1993
- Labels: Chiswick, Rock-O-Rama
- Formerly of: Skrewdriver

Ian Stuart Donaldson (11 August 1957 – 24 September 1993), more commonly known as Ian Stuart, was an English neo-Nazi musician. He was best known as the front-man of Skrewdriver, originally a punk band which, from 1983 onwards, he rebranded as a Rock Against Communism white power skinhead band. He raised money through white power concerts with his Blood & Honour network.

== Biography ==
Born in Poulton-le-Fylde, Lancashire, Donaldson attended Baines School in nearby Poulton, where he met Sean McKay, Phil Walmsley, and John Grinton. They formed the cover band Tumbling Dice, who played songs by the Rolling Stones and other bands. In 1975, they formed Skrewdriver, a band that gained a reputation for attracting violence at their concerts.

After the original Skrewdriver lineup disbanded in 1979, Donaldson formed a new lineup and began to write songs for a white power audience. The new version of Skrewdriver openly promoted far-right groups such as the National Front and raised funds for them (and affiliated organisations) through the National Front's music label, White Noise Records. Skrewdriver became known for its involvement in the White Nationalist movement and its associated music genre, Rock Against Communism. In early 1986, Donaldson was convicted of beating a Nigerian man during a larger fight involving two groups and sentenced to 12 months in prison. Donaldson was released early, and said in an interview with the neo-Nazi and Oi! magazine White Noise that he was arrested after a "mob of about ten blacks attacked 8 of us in a tube station platform", and that they were only arrested because they got the better of the other group.

In 1987, Donaldson and Skrewdriver roadie and album-cover artist Nicky Crane founded Blood & Honour, a neo-Nazi network that distributes white power music and organises concerts. Donaldson and Crane cited financial mismanagement by the National Front as reason for creating the network, in addition to claims the National Front had become insufficiently racist, since some National Front members had attempted to appeal to a more mainstream audience to improve declining membership rates.

Donaldson also became leader of two other bands—the Klansmen (a rockabilly band) and White Diamond (a hard rock/heavy metal band)—and released several solo albums. Along with Skrewdriver guitarist Stigger (Stephen Calladine), he recorded the albums Patriotic Ballads volumes 1 and 2, which included covers of folk songs such as "The Green Fields of France". Donaldson's voice also appeared in the song "The Invisible Empire".

On the night of 23 September 1993, Donaldson was involved in a car crash in Derbyshire that resulted in his death the following day, at the age of 36.

== Discography ==
=== Ian Stuart & Rough Justice ===
- Justice for the Cottbus Six (1992) (Rock-O-Rama)

=== Ian Stuart & Stigger ===
- Patriotic Ballads (1991) (Rock-O-Rama)
- Patriotic Ballads II – Our Time Will Come (1992) (Rock-O-Rama)

=== Skrewdriver ===
- All Skrewed Up (1977) (Chiswick) (later re-issued as The Early Years w. extra tracks)
- Peel Session (1977) BBC Radio 1
- Back with a Bang (1982) (Rock-O-Rama)
- The Voice of Britain (1983) (Rock-O-Rama)
- Hail the New Dawn (1984) (Rock-O-Rama)
- Blood & Honour (1985) (Rock-O-Rama)
- White Rider (1987) (Rock-O-Rama)
- After the Fire (1988) (Rock-O-Rama)
- Warlord (1989) (Rock-O-Rama)
- The Strong Survive (1990) (Rock-O-Rama)
- Freedom What Freedom (1992) (Rock-O-Rama)
- Hail Victory (1994) (ISD Records)

=== Solo albums ===
- No Turning Back (1989) (Rock-O-Rama)
- Slay The Beast (1990) (Rock-O-Rama)
- Patriot (1991) (Rock-O-Rama)

=== The Klansmen ===
- Fetch the Rope (LP, 1989 / Klan Records) (CD, 1991 / Rock-O-Rama Records)
- Rebel with a Cause (LP, 1990 / Klan Records) (CD, 1991 / Rock-O-Rama Records)
- Rock 'n' Roll Patriots (LP, 1991 / Klan Records) (CD. 1991 / Rock-O-Rama Records)

Single:

- Johnny Joined the Klan (1989 / Klan Records) (3 Songs from the "Fetch the Rope" LP)

=== White Diamond ===
- The Reaper (1991) (Rock-O-Rama)
- The Power & The Glory (1992) (Glory Discs)
