= Babylon's Burning =

1979 single by the Ruts

Single by the Ruts

from the album The Crack
- B-side: "Society"
- Released: June 1979
- Genre: Punk rock; reggae
- Length: 2:30
- Label: Virgin
- Songwriters: Malcolm Owen; Paul Fox; John Jennings
- Producer: Mick Glossop

The Ruts singles chronology
"In a Rut" (1979)	"Babylon's Burning" (1979)	"Something That I Said" (1979)

"Babylon's Burning" is a single by the English punk rock band the Ruts. Released in 1979, "Babylon's Burning" was the Ruts' debut single for Richard Branson's Virgin Records. The single peaked at number 7 on the UK singles chart, prompting the band's appearance on BBC Television's Top of the Pops. Later in 1979, the band re-recorded the song and included it on their debut studio album, The Crack. "Babylon's Burning" is considered one of the Ruts' signature songs.

== Background and composition ==
Music journalists have described "Babylon's Burning" as a punk rock song first and foremost, with some identifying reggae influences as well. The Ruts' bassist, John "Segs" Jennings, stated that the song was "rooted in reggae".

Jennings would play a scale during warmups, which the Ruts' guitarist Paul Fox adapted into the main riff of "Babylon's Burning" during a warmup session. Malcolm Owen wrote the lyrics. Jennings stated that Owen wrote the lines "with anxiety" in a way that was intended to excite audiences during live performances: "I realize now if I'm playing it [live], what's the bit you sing along with? You sing along, 'with anxiety.' The whole crowd goes wild, [so] what he added to that was great."

The version of "Babylon's Burning" that appears on The Crack begins with the sound of a blaring alarm against the backdrop of police car sirens. The alarm and sirens are absent from the single.

The lyrics of "Babylon's Burning" are political in nature and touch upon the theme of unrest and strife in British urban centres. The lyrics also explore urban riots and took specific inspiration from the Southall riots in April 1979 and the death of Blair Peach, an anti-fascist protestor whose killing came to symbolize police brutality.

== Reception ==
"Babylon's Burning" peaked at number 7 on the UK singles chart. It was the band's highest-charting single in the UK and their only top ten single; it spent a total of 11 weeks on the chart and was also their longest-charting single. The chart success of "Babylon's Burning" made it the fifth most successful punk rock song in the UK's chart history, behind four songs by the Sex Pistols. The single's success led to the Ruts making an appearance on Top of the Pops. To Jennings' recollection, the single for "Babylon's Burning" sold 230,000 copies, about 20,000 sales short of achieving silver certification.

Several reviews of The Crack distinguished "Babylon's Burning" as one of the album's strongest tracks. In their review of The Crack, AllMusic distinguished "Babylon's Burning" as a highlight of the album, stating that the song was a demonstration of the group's lyrical strengths and that the song "turns a powerful punk-rocker into an epic, with singer Malcolm Owen capturing the anger, frustration, and horror of anyone caught up in a riot." A reviewer from Wow Vinyl described vocalist Malcolm Owen's performance as "the best-ever punk vocal" and described the song's sound as "[grabbing] you by the throat and never [letting] up," complimenting its sound for "[capturing] not only the smouldering hatred and anger spilling out onto the streets but also the unadulterated fear that accompanies anarchism." Their reviewer also called the song "direct and explosive," a departure from the reggae sound the band would adopt in other songs like "Jah War."

== Legacy ==
Brian Baker, one of Bad Religion's guitarists, cited "Babylon's Burning" as being influential to him. Baker stated that he found the song's prominent riff particularly influential and "copied" it on several Bad Religion records: "I'd heard Ramones and Sex Pistols, but never anything articulated like this and nothing that built this kind of tension." Baker stated that Paul Fox's performance on the song inspired him to begin playing the guitar.

On 18 October 2005, the Ruts released a tribute to "Babylon's Burning" in the form of a full-length album called Babylon's Burning: Reconstructed Dub-Drenched Soundscapes, featuring 16 remixes and covers of the song by bands and musicians from various genres, including Die Toten Hosen, Don Letts, Rob Smith, Dreadzone, Brutal Verschimmelt ("Babylon brennt," a German-language cover), and the Groove Corporation.
