= Norton Buffalo =

American singer-songwriter (1951–2009)

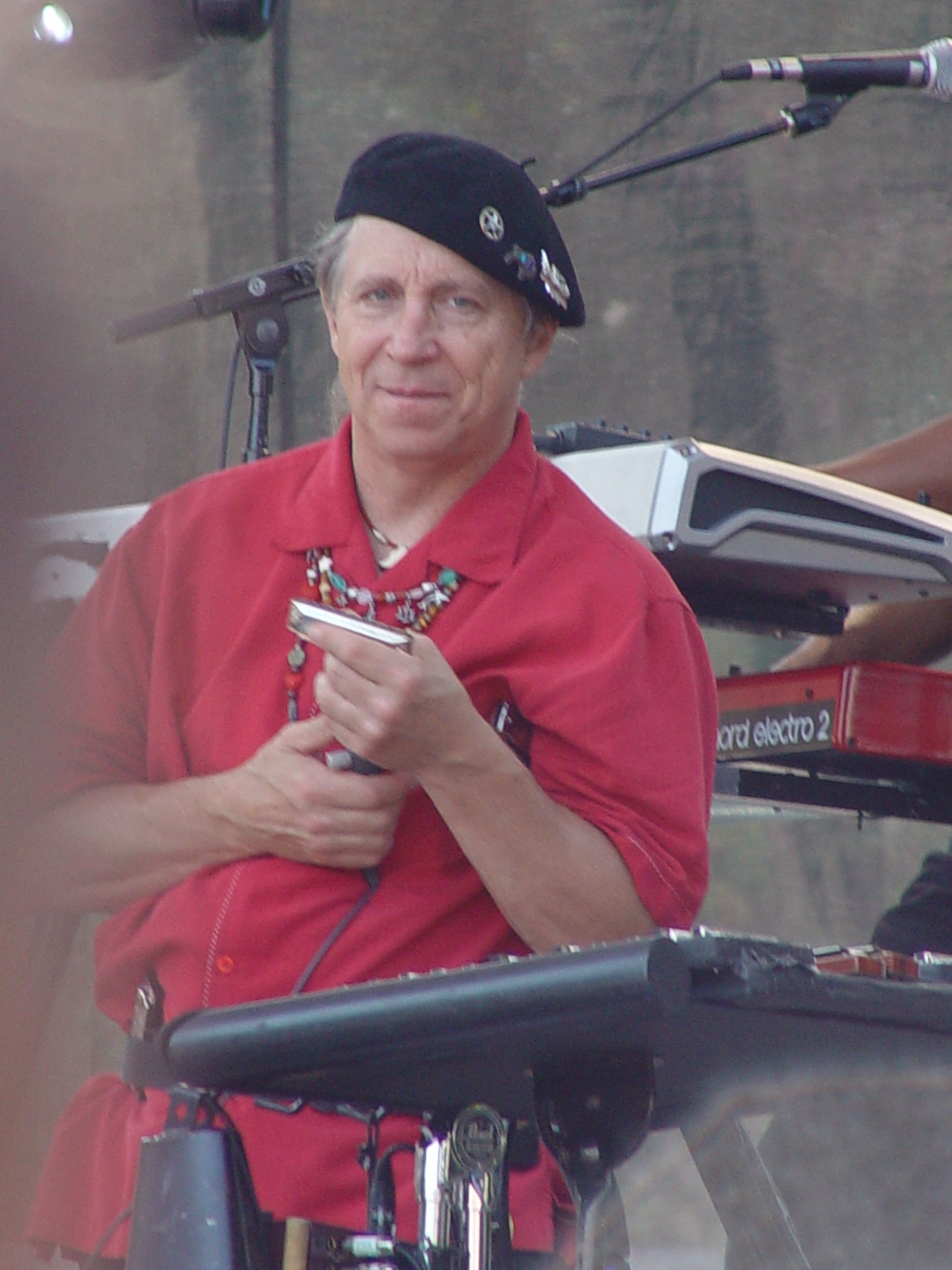
- Buffalo with the Steve Miller Band in 2006

Background information
- Born: Phillip Jackson; September 28, 1951; Oakland, California, U.S.
- Died: October 30, 2009 (aged 58) Paradise, California, U.S.
- Genres: Rock; blues; country; blues rock; psychedelic rock
- Occupations: Musician; singer–songwriter; artist; actor; record producer
- Instruments: Vocals; harmonica; trombone; keyboards; guitar; percussion
- Years active: 1976–2009
- Labels: Capitol; Blind Pig
- Formerly of: Steve Miller Band

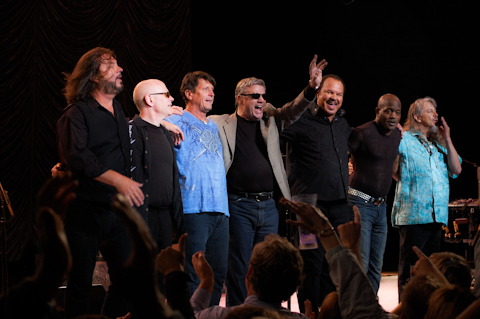
Norton Buffalo (far right, in the blue-green shirt) on his last tour with the Steve Miller Band during the summer of 2009

Phillip Jackson (September 28, 1951 – October 30, 2009), best known as Norton Buffalo, was an American singer-songwriter, country and blues harmonica player, record producer, bandleader and recording artist who was a versatile proponent of the harmonica, including chromatic and diatonic.

== Career ==
Buffalo was born in Oakland, California, and raised in Richmond, California. The son of a harmonica player, he attended John F. Kennedy High School, where he performed in a series of bands. By the early 1970s he gained renown as a San Francisco Bay Area musician, playing with such groups as Clover, The Moonlighters led by Bill Kirchen, and Elvin Bishop.

In early 1976 Buffalo joined the "farewell" European tour of Commander Cody and His Lost Planet Airmen, and was recorded on the band's final live album We've Got a Live One Here!, which included Buffalo's song "Eighteen Wheels." After the tour, Buffalo returned to California, briefly played with a number of local bands, and later in 1976 he joined the Steve Miller Band's Fly Like an Eagle Tour. He also played harmonica on the band's hit follow-up album Book of Dreams, released in May 1977. Buffalo appeared on the tracks "Winter Time" and "The Stake."

By the late 1970s Buffalo had formed his own band, The Stampede, and recorded two Capitol Records albums: Lovin' in the Valley of the Moon and Desert Horizon. In 1977 his harmonica work appeared on Bonnie Raitt's Sweet Forgiveness and The Doobie Brothers' Livin' on the Fault Line and Minute by Minute albums. Not long after the release of his second album in 1979, Buffalo and his band were featured on the PBS music television program Austin City Limits. In 1981 he produced an album for the popular Northwest band Wheatfield. He was a member of the Mickey Hart band High Noon in the late 70s and early 80s with Merl Saunders, Mike Hinton, Jim McPhearson, Vicki Randle, and Bobby Vega, and played with Saunders on the Rainforest Band album It's in the Air in 1993. Buffalo recorded three albums with slide guitarist Roy Rogers

Buffalo was legendary among "harpists" for his harmonicists solo on Bonnie Raitt's treatment of Del Shannon's "Runaway", in which he switches quickly between four different instruments (F, E♭, D♭, and C) to play across the chord changes in the song (Cm, B♭, A♭, G). An example of Buffalo's solo on "Runaway" can be seen on Bonnie Raitt's portion of the "Midnight Special" TV program broadcast on June 10, 1977, entitled "Little Feat and Friends."

Buffalo had a small speaking cameo in the rock movie, The Rose starring Bette Midler, where he was a member of the band (on harmonica and trombone). He had another cameo in Michael Cimino's 1979 film Heaven's Gate starring Kris Kristofferson, Christopher Walken, Sam Waterston and Jeff Bridges. He also co-wrote the music for the films Stacy's Knights, and Eddie Macon's Run with guitarist Mike Hinton.

Norton performed and recorded as a member of The Steve Miller Band for over 32 years. He often performed and recorded as a session musician, and appeared on 180 albums. A cover of Buffalo's song Ain't No Bread in the Breadbox was in heavy rotation at Jerry Garcia Band concerts from 1991 until Garcia's death in 1995, and appeared on the live release Shining Star. Norton continued to tour with The Steve Miller Band through early 2009, including a show on Maui.

On September 2, 2009, Buffalo was diagnosed with stage four adenocarcinoma of the lower right lobe of the lung. The next day, he found out that it had spread to his brain. Norton retired to his home in Paradise, California, where he sought treatment at Feather River Hospital and died there on October 30, 2009.

As a benefit for the Buffalo family, his friends threw "A Celebration of Life: Tribute To Norton Buffalo" at the Fox Theater in Oakland, California, on January 22 and 23, 2010. Headlined by the Steve Miller Band, the event honored his life and career. Other acts and performers included The Doobie Brothers, Bonnie Raitt, George Thorogood, Roy Rogers, Maria Muldaur, Elvin Bishop, Charlie Musselwhite, Carlos Reyes and the Norton Buffalo Band.

== Awards ==
Buffalo played harmonica on two tracks on The Doobie Brothers' Grammy-award-winning 1978 album Minute by Minute. He was also nominated for a Grammy in 1992 for "Best Country Instrumental Performance" for the tune "Song for Jessica" from his 1991 duet album R&B with Guitarist Roy Rogers on Blind Pig Records.

== Discography ==
- Lovin' in the Valley of the Moon (1977), Capitol Records
- Desert Horizon (1978), Capitol
- R & B (1991), Blind Pig Records – with slide guitarist Roy Rogers
- Travellin' Tracks (1992), Blind Pig – with slide guitarist Roy Rogers
- Here Comes the Rain (1993), Rounder Records – guest artist appearing with Laurie Lewis
- It's in the Air (1993), Summertone – guest artist appearing with Merl Saunders & the Rainforest Band
- In the Third Degree (1996), Mirage Independent – guest artist appearing with James Ibold and the Impostors
- King of the Highway (2000), Blind Pig
- Christmas Jug Band- Uncorked (2002) Guest artist singing I want a hippopotamus for Christmas. Globe Records
- Roots of Our Nature (2003), Blind Big – with slide guitarist Roy Rogers
- The Spirit of Hawaiian Slack Key Guitar (2008), Daniel Ho Creations – with George Kahumoku Jr.
- From Paradise (2012), Moon Valley Music – with George Kahumoku Jr.

With Elvin Bishop

- Big Fun (Alligator, 1988)

== Filmography ==
- Heaven's Gate (1979)
- The Rose (1979)
- Blood Beach (1980)
- Eddie Macon's Run (1983) co-wrote the music with Mike Hinton
- Stacy's Knights (1983) co-wrote the music with Mike Hinton
- Dogpound Shuffle (1974) Played the harmonica for the movie soundtrack. Actor David Soul performed the role of the harp player in the movie while Buffalo did the actual playing.

== See also ==
- List of Austin City Limits performers
- San Francisco Blues Festival
