= White rider =

White rider, White Rider, White Riders, etc. may refer to:

- Pestilence or Conquest (there is no clear consensus), the rider of the White Horse in the Four Horsemen of the Apocalypse
- White Rider (album), a 1987 album by British white power rock band Skrewdriver
- White Riders, characters in The Dark Tower novel by C.S. Lewis
- The White Riders, a 1950 children's novel in the Romney Marsh series by Monica Edwards
- the White Rider, a name of the character Gandalf in J. R. R. Tolkien's The Lord of the Rings (1954).
