= The Skin I'm In (album) =

Studio album by Elvin Bishop
- Released: 1998
- Genre: Blues
- Label: Alligator

Elvin Bishop chronology
Ace in the Hole (1995)	The Skin I'm In (1998)	That's My Partner! (2000)

The Skin I'm In is an album by the American musician Elvin Bishop, released in 1998. It was his fourth album for Alligator Records. Bishop supported it with a North American tour.

== Production ==
Bishop wrote 10 of the album's songs. Realizing his voice was only serviceable, he concentrated on writing songs that relayed superior stories. Joe Louis Walker and Charlie Musselwhite played guitar and harmonica, respectively, on "Radio Boogie", a song about hearing blues on the radio in the 1950s. Norton Buffalo played harmonica on "Long Shadows". "Shady Lane" was written by Mercy Dee. "The Skin They're In" addresses racial discrimination.

== Critical reception ==
Professional ratings
Review scores
Source	Rating
AllMusic	3/5 stars
The Baltimore Sun	3/4 stars
The Encyclopedia of Popular Music	3/5 stars
Ottawa Citizen	4/5 stars
The Penguin Guide to Blues Recordings	3/4 stars
The Philadelphia Inquirer	3/4 stars

The Independent called the album "a rollicking affair" and "a good-time record." The Ottawa Citizen wrote that it "catches old Elmo in an even mellower mood than normal." The Patriot Ledger noted that "Bishop's vocals are not his strongpoint, always raspy and sometimes strained, but with that deliciously wicked humor always lurking just below the surface."

The Baltimore Sun opined that "the highlight may be 'Long Shadows', a slow blues that's backlit by Norton Buffalo's subtle, mournful harmonica, a hint of what lingers when the party candles burn low." The Age determined that, "more than a sort of blues Harpo Marx, he's an intelligent, humorous observer, delivering convincingly in a wry voice that reflects his Tulsa, Oklahoma, origins." The Record stated that "Bishop keeps things appropriately light with festive horn arrangements, heartfelt singing, and his signature one-note guitar solos."

AllMusic considered the album "perhaps the most cohesive album he's made to date, revealing an artist coming to grips with his muse, his age and his art, all at once."

== Track listing ==
No.	Title	Length
1.	"Right Now Is the Hour"
2.	"I'm Gone"
3.	"The Skin They're In"
4.	"Middle Aged Man"
5.	"Country Blues"
6.	"That Train Is Gone"
7.	"Long Shadows"
8.	"Slow Down"
9.	"Mellow-D"
10.	"Radio Boogie"
11.	"Way Down in the Valley"
12.	"Shady Lane"
