= Mike Hinton =

American guitarist (1956–2013)

Michael David Hinton (May 4, 1956 – August 1, 2013) was an American guitarist residing in the San Francisco Bay Area. During his career, he played with numerous bands, including Norton Buffalo and the Knockouts, High Noon, and Merl Saunders & the Rainforest Band. He appeared on several albums with the Rainforest Band and other Merl Saunders projects, including It's In The Air, Fiesta Amazonica, Still Having Fun, Merl Saunders With His Funky Friends - Live, and Still Groovin.

== Career ==
Hinton played with Country Joe McDonald and Friends, and recorded with Rick Danko on A Tribute To Jerry Garcia: Deadhead Festival in Tokyo, Japan, 1997. He was also on the Roky Erickson albums Don't Slander Me and You're Gonna Miss Me: The Best Of Roky Erickson. Among his other credits are his involvement in the Mickey Hart and Merl Saunders band, High Noon, and Freddie Roulette and Friends. He co-wrote the music for the films Stacy's Knights (1982) and Eddie Macon's Run (1983), and played on the score for the 1980s remake of the television program, The Twilight Zone with Jerry Garcia, John Cipollina, David Grisman, and others. Hinton also co-wrote several songs with the world-renowned harmonica player Norton Buffalo, as well as playing lead guitar in Norton's band for approximately seven years, beginning in late 1980.

Hinton played several Merl Saunders tributes since the keyboardist's death in October 2008. A re-launch of the Rainforest Band as a tribute to Saunders took place at the 29th Starwood Festival on July 25, 2009, the site of their last performance. The tribute featured Hinton with Saunder's son and bassist Tony Saunders, Sikiru Adepoju and other members of the Rainforest Band and Saunders' projects.

== Performed or recorded with ==
- Grateful Dead: Jerry Garcia, Bob Weir, Phil Lesh, Brent Mydland, Tom Constanten, Vince Welnick, Mickey Hart, Bill Kreutzmann
- Quicksilver Messenger Service: John Cippolina, David Frieberg
- Jefferson Airplane/Jefferson Starship: Jack Casady, Don Baldwin, Pete Sears
- Santana: Jose "Chepito" Areas, Michael Carabello
- Country Joe and the Fish / Country Joe McDonald and Friends: Joe McDonald, Barry Melton
- Rainforest Band: Merl Saunders, Muruga Booker, Vince Littleton, Michael Warren, Tony Saunders
- Johnnie Johnson and Unreal
- Max Gail Band
- High Noon: Mickey Hart, Jim McPherson (Copperhead), Bobby Vega (Etta James)
- Norton Buffalo and the Knockouts
- Schellville Southside Blues Band
- Zero: Greg Anton, Chip Roland, Steve Kimock
- Sons of Champlin: Geoffrey Palmer, Jim Preston
- Barry Melton Band
- Peter Albin (Big Brother and the Holding Company)
- Byron Allred (Steve Miller Band)
- Trey Anastasio (Phish)
- Maya Angelou
- Babatunde Olatunji
- Joan Baez
- John Barbata (Dinosaurs)
- Elvin Bishop
- Bobby Black
- Vernon Black (Mariah Carey)
- Ed Bogas
- O'Teal Burbage (Allman Brothers)
- Paul Butterfield
- Ray Chew (Showtime at the Apollo)
- Vassar Clements (Old & In the Way)
- The Coasters
- Lacy J. Dalton
- Rick Danko (The Band)
- John Dawson (New Riders of the Purple Sage)
- Austin de Lone
- Lance Dickerson (Commander Cody)
- Greg Douglass (Steve Miller Band)
- Roky Erickson (13th Floor Elevators)
- Steve Erquiaga (Andy Narell)
- Greg Errico
- Mimi Farina (Bread and Roses)
- Billy C. Farlow (Commander Cody)
- Martin Fiero (Legion of Mary)
- Mic Gillette (Tower of Power)
- Nate Ginsberg (Herbie Hancock)
- Bill Graham
- Nick Gravenites (Electric Flag)
- Rusty Gauthier (New Riders of the Purple Sage)
- David Grisman
- Billy Hart (Herbie Hancock)
- Edwin Hawkins Singers
- Mark Isham
- Dr. John
- Matt Kelly (Kingfish)
- Kronos Quartet
- Lowell "Banana" Levinger (The Youngbloods)
- Huey Lewis
- Carl Lockett (Jimmy Smith)
- Harvey Mandel
- Mel Martin
- Scott Mathews
- John McFee (Clover/Doobie Brothers)
- Buddy Miles (Electric Flag/Jimi Hendrix)
- Steve Miller
- Ziggy Modeliste
- Eddie Moore (Woody Shaw)
- Maria Muldaur
- Charlie Musselwhite
- Mark Naftalin (Butterfield Blues Band)
- Odetta
- Sammy Piazza (Hot Tuna)
- John Popper (Blues Traveler)
- Jimmy Pugh (Robert Cray Band)
- Chuck Rainey (Steely Dan)
- Vicki Randle (George Benson/Tonight Show)
- Brett Rasmussen (Merl Saunders)
- Roy Rogers
- Freddie Roulette
- John Schneider (Dukes of Hazzard)
- Melvin Seals (Jerry Garcia Band)
- Ron Stallings (Reconstruction/Elvin Bishop)
- Luther Tucker (Little Walter Jacobs)
- Bill Vitt (Saunders-Garcia Band)
- Narada Michael Walden
- "Bishop" Norman Williams
- Kate Wolf

== Television appearances and works ==
- "Q" for KQED (Merl Saunders & the Rainforest Band live)
- KGO Curethon (Merl Saunders & the Rainforest Band live)
- Tales From The Crypt (TV series) (HBO); "On A Dead Man's Chest"; directed by William Friedkin
- Rediscovering The Amazon - Filmed on the Amazon River (documentary for Moondragon Pictures)
- The Twilight Zone (CBS); "The Girl That I Married" (with John Cippolina), "Shelter Skelter", "Joy Ride", "The Junction" (with David Grisman), "Dead Run" (with Bob Weir and Brent Mydland)
- Studio Cafe (Norton Buffalo and Michael Hinton duo live)
- Norton Buffalo and the Knockouts live (KRCB)
- Sports America (with NCAA Basketball Coaches Abe Lemons and Eddie Sutton)
- "Revenge Of The Insects" (for PBS, with Barry Melton and Mickey Hart)

== Discography ==
- I Ain't No Angel – Lindy Gravelle (1982)
- Don't Slander Me – Roky Erickson (Restless, 1986)
- You're Gonna Miss Me: The Best Of Roky Erickson (Restless, 1991)
- It's In The Air – Merl Saunders & the Rainforest Band (Sumertone, 1993)
- Still Having Fun – Merl Saunders (Sumertone, 1995)
- Fiesta Amazonica – Merl Saunders & the Rainforest Band (Sumertone, 1998)
- Merl Saunders With His Funky Friends - Live (Sumertone,1998)
- Still Groovin – Merl Saunders (Sumertone, 2004)
- San Francisco After Dark – Merl Saunders
- A Promise Kept – Jim McPherson (2009)
- Keystone Revisited – Tony Saunders, Bill Vitt, Steve Abramson, Jeff Pevar (2013)
- Sonoma Soundtrack – Schellville Southside Blues Band
- Joan Baez (unreleased tracks) – produced by Mickey Hart featuring members of the Grateful Dead and High Noon (2001)

== Filmography ==
=== Scores ===
- Stacy's Knights – co-wrote and performed with Norton Buffalo (Crown International Pictures, 1982)
- Eddie Macon's Run – co-wrote and performed with Norton Buffalo (Universal Pictures / MCA, 1983)

=== DVDs ===
- Saunders & Friends by John Metzger – The Music Box, November 1998, Volume 5, #11
- Chet Helms: Tribal Stomp (with Country Joe McDonald and Friends)
- 2B1 Multimedia

=== Laser disc ===
- A Tribute To Jerry Garcia: Deadhead Festival in Tokyo, Japan, 1997 – Japanese Laser Disc NTSC - VAP Video Super Rock series VPLR-70650 (1997–98)
