= White Rider (album) =

- Cover of White Rider depicting a Klansman on horseback, a nod to the film The Birth of a Nation

Studio album by Skrewdriver
- Released: 1987
- Genre: Rock Against Communism
- Length: 43:04
- Language: English
- Label: Rock-O-Rama
- Producer: Mark Sutherland

Skrewdriver chronology
Blood & Honour (1985)	White Rider (1987)	After the Fire (1988)

Professional ratings
Review scores
Source	Rating
AllMusic	1/5 stars

White Rider is the fourth album by British white power rock band Skrewdriver, released in 1987. The name and the first titular song references the Ku Klux Klan, while its cover references D.W. Griffith's 1915 pro-KKK film, The Birth of a Nation.

== Track listing ==
All of the songs were written by Ian Stuart Donaldson.

1. "White Rider" – 3:19
2. "Where Has Justice Gone" – 2:50
3. "Strikeforce" – 2:51
4. "Behind the Bars" – 3:27
5. "Pride of a Nation" – 3:12
6. "New Nation" – 4:41
7. "The Snow Fell" – 5:07
8. "I Can See the Fire" – 3:13
9. "Thunder in the Cities" – 2:42
10. "We Fight for Freedom" – 4:10
11. "White Warriors" – 3:08
12. "Built Up, Knocked Down" – 4:31

== Personnel ==
- Ian Stuart – vocals
- Martin Cross – guitar
- Merv Shields – bass
- Mark Sutherland – drums

== Release history ==
Region	Date	Label	Format	Catalog
Germany	1987	Rock-O-Rama	Stereo LP	RRR 66
Germany	1991	Rock-O-Rama	CD	RCD 136
