= Don't Let the Bossman Get You Down! =

Studio album by Elvin Bishop
- Released: 1991
- Studios: Starlight, Richmond, California
- Genre: Blues rock
- Label: Alligator
- Producer: Elvin Bishop

Elvin Bishop chronology
Big Fun (1988)	Don't Let the Bossman Get You Down! (1991)	The Best of Elvin Bishop: Tulsa Shuffle (1994)

Don't Let the Bossman Get You Down! is an album by the American musician Elvin Bishop, released in 1991.

Bishop supported the album by touring with George Thorogood.

== Production ==
Don't Let the Bossman Get You Down! was produced by Bishop, who also wrote half of the album's songs. The title track was inspired by a dispute Bishop had with his label head, Bruce Iglauer. "Stepping Up in Class" is a cover of Jimmy McCracklin's "Steppin'". "Devil's Slide" is an instrumental, while "Rollin' with My Blues" is a tribute to Freddie King, Albert King, and B.B. King.

== Critical reception ==
Professional ratings
Review scores
Source	Rating
AllMusic	4/5 stars
Calgary Herald	B+
Chicago Tribune	3/4 stars
Robert Christgau	(1-star Honorable Mention)
The Encyclopedia of Popular Music	3/5 stars
Houston Chronicle	3.5/4 stars
MusicHound Rock: The Essential Album Guide	3/5 stars
The Rolling Stone Album Guide	3.5/5 stars
The Tampa Tribune	3/4 stars

The Calgary Herald noted that there is "lots of leftover nuance from the Paul Butterfield Blues Band days to remind you that this was once a pair of hands equated with Hendrix and Clapton." The Chicago Tribune praised the "serious playing here, adding some potent slide guitar to 'Come On in This House' and some razor-sharp licks to 'Stepping Up in Class'."

The Houston Chronicle thought that "a little slide action and tasty arrangements on several cuts open the door for Bishop's considerable and road-hardened guitar work, which is as focused on record as it has been in years." The San Diego Union-Tribune determined that, while the album "features the trademark Bishop humor and the occasional dash of funk, it is, for the most part, a straight blues effort."

== Track listing ==
All tracks are written by Elvin Bishop; except where noted.

No.	Title	Writer(s)	Length
1.	"Fannie Mae"	Deborahe Glasgow	3:18
2.	"Don't Let the Bossman Get You Down"		2:48
3.	"Murder in the First Degree"	St. Louis Jimmy Oden	3:08
4.	"Kissing in the Dark"	Ernest Lawlers	2:44
5.	"My Whiskey Head Buddies"		5:23
6.	"Stepping Up in Class"	Jimmy McCracklin	2:56
7.	"You Got to Rock 'Em"		4:10
8.	"Come On in This House"	Mel London	3:09
9.	"Soul Food"		2:45
10.	"Rollin' with My Blues"		3:38
11.	"Devil's Slide"		2:57
12.	"Just Your Fool"	Walter Jacobs	2:42
