= Eddie Macon's Run =

1983 film by Jeff Kanew

- Theatrical release poster
- Directed by: Jeff Kanew
- Written by: Jeff Kanew
- Based on: Eddie Macon's Run by James McLendon
- Produced by: Martin Bregman; Louis A. Stroller
- Starring: Kirk Douglas; John Schneider; Lee Purcell
- Cinematography: James A. Contner
- Edited by: Jeff Kanew
- Music by: Norton Buffalo; Mike Hinton
- Distributed by: Universal Pictures
- Release date: March 23, 1983
- Running time: 95 minutes
- Country: United States
- Language: English
- Budget: $5 million
- Box office: $1.2 million

Eddie Macon's Run is a 1983 American action thriller drama film written and directed by Jeff Kanew, based on the 1980 novel of the same name by James McLendon. It stars Kirk Douglas and John Schneider, and also includes John Goodman in his feature film debut.

== Plot ==
The film opens with Eddie Macon escaping from prison. The first half of the film then relates the backstory through a series of flashbacks.

Eddie is a man that has relocated from Florida to Texas in order to better provide for his wife Chris and their young son Bobby, who suffers from a blood disorder. His temper leads him into a few minor infractions that land him in jail, but after an unsuccessful escape attempt, he finds himself with an excessively harsh prison sentence in light of his original offences.

Feeling that they are facing injustice, Eddie and Chris devise an elaborate escape plan. After initially becoming involved with the prison rodeo and stowing away in a cattle truck, he begins a long, cross-country run across the Texas wilderness in an attempt to reach the United States–Mexico border in Laredo, Texas, where they have planned their rendezvous and permanent escape, south of the border.

Along the way, he is being chased by Carl Marzack, an inmate transfers detective who had already re-captured Eddie after his earlier escape attempt. Marzack is able to successfully track Eddie, but is thwarted when Eddie encounters new players along the way. First, Eddie is captured, and nearly hanged for rustling, by a dysfunctional ranching family, the Potts, until he escapes. Next, he encounters Jilly Buck, niece of the governor, whom Eddie initially kidnaps. Jilly is sympathetic to Eddie's story and quickly agrees to assist him with his plan, escaping to a hotel in Laredo.

Marzack eventually catches up with Eddie and Jilly in their hotel room where he taunts Eddie for continuously stopping in his attempts to escape; which is how he was able to piece the clues together and track him down. After Eddie taunts Marzack to kill him, Jilly knocks Marzack unconscious and Eddie steals his gun, leading to Marzack pursuing him and Jilly in a car chase until Eddie shoots at Marzack's car, causing it to topple over. Ultimately, an injured Marzack captures Eddie, but has a change of heart and decides to let him go.

With no one pursuing him any longer, Eddie is able to meet his wife and son on a bridge over the Rio Grande and the three begin their journey to the border into Mexico for freedom.

== Cast ==
- Kirk Douglas as Carl Marzack
- John Schneider as Eddie Macon
- Lee Purcell as Jilly Buck
- Leah Ayres as Chris Macon
- Lisa Dunsheath as Kay Potts
- Tom Noonan as Daryl Potts
- J. C. Quinn as Shorter
- Gil Rogers as Logan
- Jay O. Sanders as Rudy Potts
- Mark Margolis as 5:00 Bar Owner

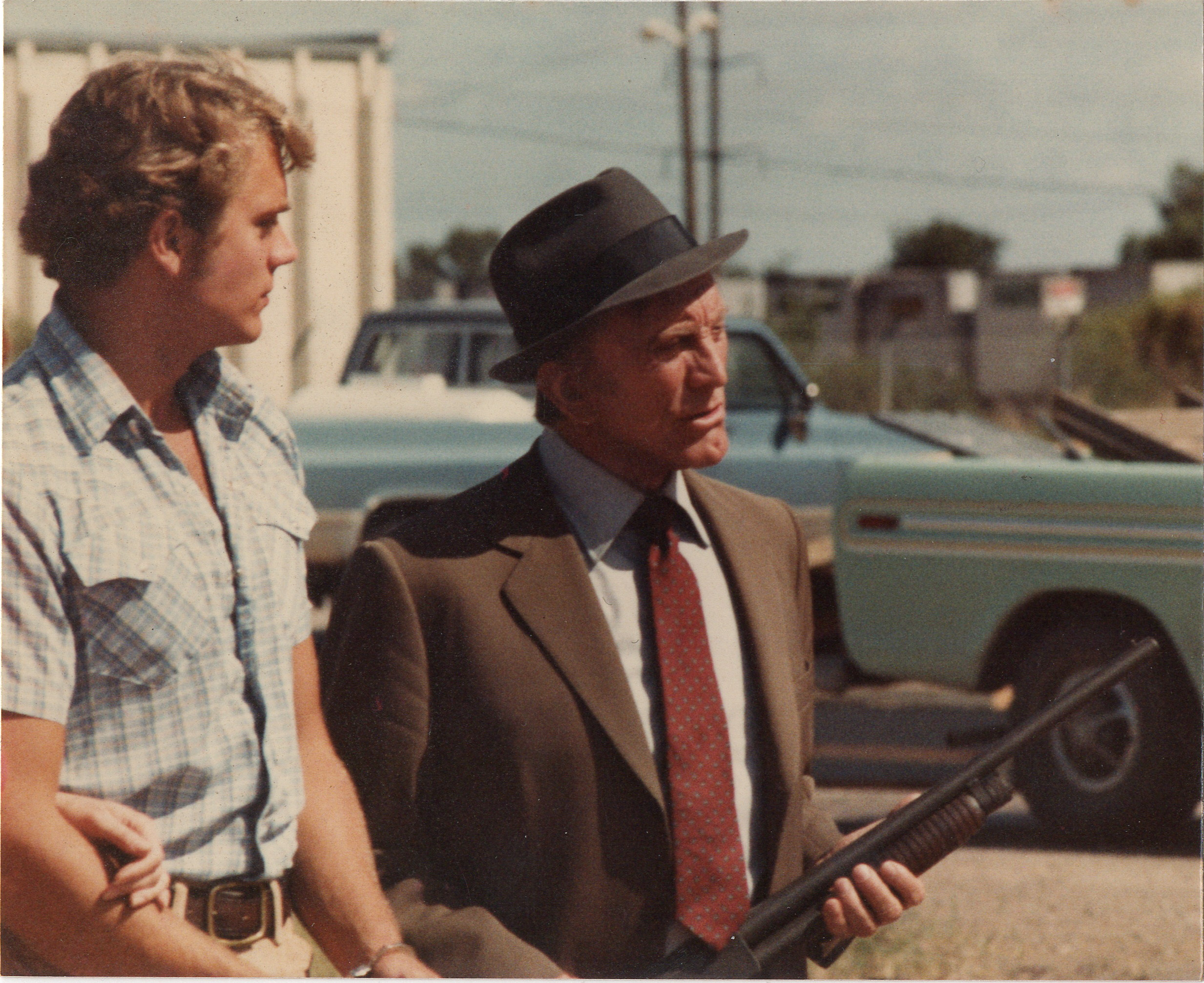
Kirk Douglas (right) and John Schneider (left) on the set of the movie Eddie Macon's Run during its filming in 1983

In addition, three actors made their first film appearances, in minor roles: J. T. Walsh and Dann Florek are two guys in a bar, while John Goodman plays Mr. Hebert.

== Reception ==
The film was a star vehicle for John Schneider after he achieved fame in The Dukes of Hazzard television show, but Hal Ericson of the All Movie Guide commented, "the title character (John Schneider) takes a back seat during most of the proceedings. Most of the footage is devoted to Eddie's chief nemesis, small-town lawman Marzack (Kirk Douglas)." Ericson concludes the film is a "lively (if pointless) adaptation of James McLendon's novel." Leonard Maltin gave the film two and a half stars out of four, calling it "bumpy."
