= San Francisco Records =

American record label

- Founded: 1969
- Founder: Bill Graham, David Rubinson
- Status: Active
- Genre: Contemporary Jazz
- Country of origin: United States
- Location: Emeryville, California

San Francisco Records is a record label originally based in San Francisco, California, United States, and founded by music promoter Bill Graham and music producer David Rubinson in 1969 and was distributed by Atlantic Records. Since 2010 San Francisco Records has been operated by Ron Umile, former manager of the San Francisco band Quicksilver Messenger Service. Umile was also a talent agent for Associated Booking Corporation in the 1970s and represented B.B. King, Bobby "Blue" Bland, Bob Marley, Ramsey Lewis and other major attractions. As a tribute to Bill Graham and his personal love for jazz, Umile relaunched the label with a focus on contemporary jazz.

== Artist roster ==
=== Current roster ===
- Tony Saunders
- Rainforest Band
- Rock Hendricks
- Ashling Cole
- Keystone Revisited

=== Past Roster ===
- Cold Blood
- Hammer
- David Lannan
- Tower of Power
- Victoria

== See also ==
- List of record labels
