= All Skrewed Up =

Studio album by Skrewdriver
- Released: 1977
- Genre: Punk rock; oi!
- Length: 25:54; 30:00 (German version)
- Label: Chiswick
- Producer: Skrewdriver; Roger Armstrong

Skrewdriver chronology
All Skrewed Up (1977)	Hail the New Dawn (1984)

All Skrewed Up is the debut studio album by the English rock band Skrewdriver, released in 1977. It was issued with four different sleeve colours - green, orange, yellow, and pink. It was later re-released in 1990 as "The Early Years" with five additional tracks, including the singles "Unbeliever" and "Streetfight", originally issued on the German release. The Early Years is the only official release of the All Skrewed Up tracks on CD.

Ian Stuart Donaldson was the only member of the record's line-up to play on future Skrewdriver releases.

The album contains none of the neo-Nazi-themed and white power-themed lyrics that Skrewdriver used later.

== Track listing ==
=== Original vinyl pressing, 1977, Chiswick Records ===
All tracks are written by Ian Stuart Donaldson, except where noted.

Side one
No.	Title	Writer(s)	Length
1.	"Where's It Gonna End?"		2:31
2.	"Government Action"	Donaldson, Phil Walmsley	1:34
3.	"Back Street Kids"		1:38
4.	"Gotta Be Young"	Donaldson, Walmsley	1:59
5.	"I Don't Need Your Love"		2:01
6.	"I Don't Like You"	Donaldson, Walmsley	1:55
7.	"An-Ti-So-Cial"	Donaldson, Walmsley	1:26

Side two
No.	Title	Writer(s)	Length
1.	"(Too Much) Confusion"		2:32
2.	"9 Till 5"		2:04
3.	"Jailbait"		1:12
4.	"We Don't Pose"		1:49
5.	"The Only One"		2:49
6.	"Won't Get Fooled Again"	Pete Townshend	2:24
Total length:			25:54

The tracks "Streetfight" and "Unbeliever" (intended to be the A and B sides on a 7" which never made it past the test pressing stage) were included on the German version of the album as tracks 8 and 12, respectively.

=== CD reissue, 1991, Rock-O-Rama Records ===
No.	Title	Writer(s)	Length
1.	"You're So Dumb"		2:28
2.	"Government Action"	Donaldson, Walmsley	1:34
3.	"I Don't Like You"	Donaldson, Walmsley	1:56
4.	"We Don't Pose"		1:49
5.	"I Don't Need Your Love"		2:02
6.	"An-Ti-So-Cial"	Donaldson, Walmsley	1:26
7.	"Jailbait"		1:13
8.	"The Only One"		2:50
9.	"Gotta Be Young"	Donaldson, Walmsley	2:00
10.	"(Too Much) Confusion"		2:33
11.	"Streetfight"		2:19
12.	"Better Off Crazy"	Donaldson, Walmsley	2:03
13.	"19th Nervous Breakdown"	Mick Jagger, Keith Richards	1:51
14.	"Where's It Gonna End?"		2:32
15.	"Won't Get Fooled Again"	Townshend	2:25
16.	"Unbeliever"		1:33
17.	"9 Till 5"		2:05
18.	"Back Street Kids"		1:39
Total length:			36:18

"Streetfight" and "Unbeliever" were taken from the German version of the album, "You're So Dumb" and "Better Off Crazy" from the "You're So Dumb" single and "19th Nervous Breakdown" from the "Antisocial" single.

== Personnel ==
Skrewdriver

- Ian Stuart Donaldson – vocals
- Phil Walmsley – guitar
- Kevin McKay – bass
- John "Grinny" Grinton – drums
- Kevin Wilson – vocals

Technical

- Neil Richmond – engineer

== Sources ==
- All Skrewed Up at Discogs
