= Big Fun (Elvin Bishop album) =

Studio album by Elvin Bishop
- Released: 1988
- Recorded: 1988
- Studio: Starlight Sound, Richmond, California
- Genre: Blues
- Length: 35:52
- Label: Alligator; AL 4767
- Producer: Elvin Bishop

Elvin Bishop chronology
| Is You Is or Is You Ain't My Baby (1981) | Big Fun (1988) | Don't Let the Bossman Get You Down! (1991) |

Big Fun is an album by the American blues musician Elvin Bishop, released by the Alligator label in 1988.

== Reception ==
Professional ratings
Review scores
| Source | Rating |
|---|---|
| AllMusic | 3/5 stars |
| Christgau's Record Guide | B+ |
| The Penguin Guide to Blues Recordings | 3/4 stars |

AllMusic reviewer William Ruhlmann stated that "this record, which, naturally, emphasizes his more blues-oriented guitar playing, although without sacrificing his country boy identity". The Penguin Guide to Blues Recordings wrote: "These albums have a quality rarely encountered in records of their type - personality. Much of that is down to the garrulity of Bishop's singing and his quirky angular guitar solos ... If the albums have fault, it's Bishop's inclination to indulge in his own form of blues-rap ... it's pleasant enough but it's an easy way out".

== Track listing ==
All compositions by Elvin Bishop except where noted

1. "Don't You Lie to Me" (Hudson Whittaker) − 3:25
2. "Beer Drinking Woman" (Peter Chatman) − 4:12
3. "Oklahoma Country Girl" − 2:47
4. "My Dog" (William Schuler) − 3:33
5. "Midnight Hour Blues" (Leroy Carr) − 3:31
6. "No Broken Hearts" − 2:50
7. "The Right String But the Wrong Yo-Yo" (Willie Perryman) − 2:35
8. "She Puts Me in the Mood" − 3:32
9. "Country Boy" − 3:01
10. "Honest I Do" (Jimmy Reed) − 3:01
11. "Fishin' Again" − 3:25

== Personnel ==
- Elvin Bishop − guitar, vocals
- Stevie Gurr − guitar, harmonica, backing vocals
- Nancy Wright, Terry Hanck − tenor saxophone
- Reynaldo "Daddy Ray" Arvizu Jr. − alto saxophone
- Phil Aaberg, Mac "Dr. John" Rebennack − keyboards
- Michael "Fly" Brooks − bass
- Norton Buffalo − guitar, harmonica
- Gary Silva – drums, backing vocals
- Kathy Kennedy, Katie Guthorn – drums, backing vocals
- The Carptones, Whit Lehnberg – general mayhem (track 11)
