= Ace in the Hole (album) =

Studio album by Elvin Bishop
- Released: 1995
- Genre: Blues, blues rock
- Label: Alligator
- Producer: Bill Thompson, Elvin Bishop

Elvin Bishop chronology
The Best of Elvin Bishop: Tulsa Shuffle (1994)	Ace in the Hole (1995)	The Skin I'm In (1998)

Ace in the Hole is an album by the American musician Elvin Bishop, released in 1995. It was his third album for Alligator Records. Bishop promoted the album by touring with B. B. King. Ace in the Hole was nominated for a Bammie Award.

== Production ==
Ace in the Hole was produced by Bill Thompson and Bishop. Charlie Musselwhite played harmonica on the album. "Home of the Blues" is about Bishop's time playing in Chicago blues clubs. "Driving Wheel" is a cover of the Roosevelt Sykes song. Bishop was excited to include several instrumentals.

== Critical reception ==
Professional ratings
Review scores
Source	Rating
AllMusic	3/5 stars
Robert Christgau	(choice cut)
The Encyclopedia of Popular Music	3/5 stars
MusicHound Rock: The Essential Album Guide	3.5/5 stars
The Penguin Guide to Blues Recordings	3/4 stars

The Christian Science Monitor wrote that Bishop's "tongue-in-cheek lyrics and country stylings are enlivened by his blistering guitar work." Robert Christgau praised "Another Mule Kickin' in Your Stall". The Chicago Tribune deemed the album "typically irreverent, distinctive blues-rock." The Columbus Dispatch stated that it "features hilarious talkin' tales in the jump blues tradition, especially the New Orleans jazz-flavored 'Fishin''."

The Vancouver Sun determined that "Ace in the Hole is a reminder the blues aren't just for melancholics." The Washington Post wrote: "When Bishop gives a sermon on the distribution of wealth in his own 'Give Me Some of That Money' or on the faithfulness of the married in Dave Bartholomew's 'Another Mule Kickin' in Your Stall', his droll delivery provides the perfect counterpoint to the sparkling playing by the guitarist and his top-notch road band." The Press of Atlantic City called the album "a blues masterwork."

== Track listing ==
No.	Title	Length
1.	"Another Mule Kickin' in Your Stall"
2.	"Driving Wheel (Inst.)"
3.	"Give Me Some of That Money"
4.	"Ace in the Hole"
5.	"Party 'Til the Cows Come Home"
6.	"Think"
7.	"Home of the Blues"
8.	"Pigmeat on the Line (Inst.)"
9.	"Ain't That Love"
10.	"Fishin'"
11.	"Blue Flame (Inst.)"
12.	"Talkin' Mood"
13.	"Fooled Around and Fell in Love (Inst.)"
