= Juke Joint Jump =

Studio album by Elvin Bishop
- Released: 1975
- Studio: Record Plant, Sausalito
- Genre: Rock
- Label: Capricorn
- Producer: Johnny Sandlin

Elvin Bishop chronology
The Best of Elvin Bishop: Crabshaw Rising (1975)	Juke Joint Jump (1975)	Struttin' My Stuff (1975)

Juke Joint Jump is an album by the American musician Elvin Bishop, released in 1975. It peaked at No. 46 on the Billboard 200. The first single was "Sure Feels Good". Bishop supported the album with a North American tour.

== Production ==
Recorded at the Record Plant, in Sausalito, California, the album was produced by Johnny Sandlin. The title track is about the Shaboo Inn nightclub, which was located in Willimantic, Connecticut. Bishop made use of honky-tonk piano on several tracks. "Crawling King Snake" is a cover of the John Lee Hooker song. "Calling All Cows" was written by Earley Dranne. June Pointer provided backing vocals on "Hold On". Stephen Stills played guitar on "Rollin' Home".

== Critical reception ==
Professional ratings
Review scores
Source	Rating
All Music Guide to the Blues	3/5 stars
Robert Christgau	B
The Encyclopedia of Popular Music	3/5 stars
MusicHound Rock: The Essential Album Guide	2.5/5 stars
The New Rolling Stone Record Guide	3/5 stars

The Statesville Record and Landmark opined that Bishop "probably makes some of the most genuine good-time music in the business." The Buffalo News concluded that "a happier record hasn't come out all year." The Boston Globe praised Bishop's "good-humored professionalism". The Richmond Times-Dispatch said that Bishop "has blended nicely into the Macon genre of rock 'n' roll." The Sunday Times Advertiser noted the "inimitably goofy, happy-drunk groove that is every Bishop band's trademark." The Dayton Daily News called the music "some of the finest, get-down-with-it boogie being recorded these days."

Ed Ward, in The Village Voice's 1975 Pazz & Jop poll, ranked Juke Joint Jump as the best album of the year.

== Track listing ==
Side 1

1. "Juke Joint Jump"
2. "Calling All Cows"
3. "Rollin' Home"
4. "Wide River"

Side 2

1. "Sure Feels Good"
2. "Arkansas Line"
3. "Hold On"
4. "Crawling King Snake"
5. "Do Nobody Wrong"
