= Barry Prudom =

English murderer

Barry Peter Prudom
- Born: 18 October 1944; Leeds, West Riding of Yorkshire, England
- Died: 4 July 1982 (aged 37); Malton, North Yorkshire, England
- Cause of death: Suicide by gunshot
- Resting place: Unmarked grave, Harehills Cemetery, Leeds
- Other names: Barry Edwards, Phantom in the Forest
- Occupation: Electrician
- Spouse: Gillian Wilson (divorced 1977)
- Children: 2
- Parent(s): Peter Kurylo and Kathleen Edwards
- Status: Deceased (suicide)

Barry Peter Prudom (born Barry Edwards; 18 October 1944 – 4 July 1982), dubbed the Phantom of the Forest, was an English electrician and multiple murderer who became the subject of what was, at the time, the largest manhunt in British history. Prudom became a fugitive after killing PC David Haigh on 17 June 1982. He proceeded to kill twice more, shooting civilian George Luckett on 23 June and Sergeant David Winter on 28 June.

Described as an "avid outdoorsman and firearms enthusiast", Prudom's knowledge of military survival skills learned while training with the Special Air Service (SAS) helped him evade capture for eighteen days as he hid out in rural areas in the north of England. When eventually found, having been tracked by "Jungle" Eddie McGee, a former SAS instructor, he died by suicide by firing a single shot to his head. It later transpired that Prudom had previously attended survival courses run by McGee and had made extensive study of a manual on survival techniques written by the SAS veteran, entitled No Need To Die.

== Early life ==
Barry Prudom was the illegitimate son of Kathleen Edwards, a Leeds dressmaker, and Peter Kurylo, a soldier serving with the British Army. Kurylo played no part in Prudom's upbringing and the two never met. Prudom lived with his mother at 39 Grosvenor Place, Leeds, and attended Blenheim Primary School and Meanwood Secondary School. His last name was changed in 1949 when his mother married Alex Prudom.

Prudom was briefly sent to an approved school in Aycliffe Village, County Durham for housebreaking. After leaving school, he commenced an apprenticeship and trained as an electrician. In October 1965 he married Gillian Wilson, who was then aged 19. There were two children from the marriage, a daughter born in 1966 and a son in 1968. Prudom's mother died in a drowning accident while on holiday in 1973.

=== Service with special forces ===
In 1969 Prudom enlisted with Leeds-based B Squadron, 23 Special Air Service (V), part of the Army's part-time volunteer Territorial force. The unit specialised in covert surveillance, reconnaissance and "stay-behind" operations. Prudom was eventually rejected by the unit as he was considered temperamentally unsuitable and disliked discipline. It is unknown which stage he had reached in the selection phase, which for the Territorials is spread over a longer period, although he did participate in training manoeuvres with the unit. An official statement revealed only that he had "failed the final initiative test".

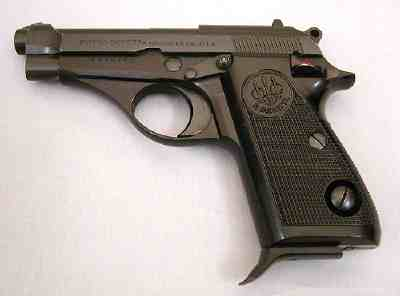
Beretta "Jaguar" of the type used by Prudom

=== Marital breakdown ===
Prudom subsequently established himself as a grocer, and purchased a shop for his wife on Quarry Street, Leeds, but by 1977 he was working for the petroleum industry in Saudi Arabia to earn more money. While he was there his wife left him for another man. Police later disclosed that "While he was [in Saudi Arabia] his wife formed a liaison with another man and he got a 'Dear John' letter, which must have had a traumatic effect on him. From being a very stable hard working man, he became morose and irritable, and he was even more annoyed when he returned to England and found his wife had taken £8000 from the bank account".

Between 1977 and 1982, Prudom dated Carol Francis. The two travelled extensively as he took work on oil rigs in Canada and the United States. In January 1982, while Prudom was in Wakefield, West Yorkshire, he was arrested for a violent assault on a motorist with an iron bar. After failing to attend Leeds Crown Court to answer bail, a warrant was issued for his arrest. Francis had by now left Prudom and moved out of the house in Leeds where they had been living.

=== Illegal possession of firearms ===
Prudom did not hold a licence to possess firearms, but carried a .22 LR calibre Beretta Model 71 "Jaguar" pistol, which he had purchased in the US and smuggled back into Britain.

== Timeline ==
=== 17 June – Murder of PC David Haigh ===
After commencing duty at 06:00 on 17 June 1982, PC David Haigh, aged 29, was attempting to serve a summons on a poacher in the Washburn Valley near Harrogate, North Yorkshire. When Haigh failed to respond to a radio call from his station at Harrogate, PC Mick Clipston was sent to check on his whereabouts, and discovered his patrol car at a picnic site at Norwood Edge near Beckwithshaw. The door of the car was still open and Haigh's body was next to it, having been killed by a single shot to the head. Haigh's clipboard was found, on which he had written, "Clive Jones, born 18/10/44, Leeds NFA" followed by a vehicle registration number, KYF 326P. Having cleared the poacher and a Leeds man called Clive Jones of involvement, police launched a murder investigation, headed by North Yorkshire Police's assistant chief constable, David Burke.

The registration number recorded by Haigh belonged to a metallic green Citroën, which police ascertained had been the subject of a cash sale to an unknown man at Kingsbury, London, in January 1982. A witness came forward to say that he had seen the car parked at the murder location at approximately 06:35 on 17 June.

=== 19 June – Car discovered ===
Prudom's Citroën was discovered burned out in a cornfield near Ledsham, West Yorkshire, around twenty-five miles from the scene of Haigh's murder.

=== 20 June – Robbery of Freda Jackson ===
After abandoning his car, Prudom had hitchhiked and walked to Torksey, Lincolnshire, where on 20 June he broke into a house and tied up the elderly occupant, 75-year-old Freda Jackson. He stole £4.50 from her then left, saying later that he had been unconcerned about her welfare as he knew "the bread man would find her in the morning". The robbery was not connected to Prudom until 23 June.

=== 23 June – Murder of George Luckett ===
Just before dawn on 23 June, Prudom broke into another home approximately eight miles away in Girton, Nottinghamshire. The occupants, 52-year-old electrician George Luckett and his wife Sylvia, aged 50, were tied together at the elbows and each shot once in the head. George Luckett's wound was fatal but Sylvia Luckett survived, although she was left with permanent brain damage and no clear recollection of the incident. After Prudom left the scene, Mrs Luckett managed to crawl to a nearby house and raise the alarm with neighbours. Prudom took the Lucketts' brown-coloured Rover, registration VAU 875S, and drove to Dalby Forest in North Yorkshire. At some point he stole registration plates from another car, CYG 344T, and attached them to the Rover.

When North Yorkshire Police received details of the Girton murder and of the Torksey robbery, they concluded that the same man was responsible. Incident rooms at Nottinghamshire Police and Lincolnshire Police were connected to the North Yorkshire Police's computer to allow the three police forces to share and compare information relating to the investigations.

=== 24 June – Attempted murder of PC Oliver ===
On 24 June, Prudom was stopped during a routine check in the Bickley area of Dalby Forest, approximately eight miles from Scarborough, by police dog handler PC Ken Oliver. When Oliver asked him to step out of the vehicle, Prudom opened fire with his .22 pistol, the first round hitting the officer's face. As Prudom got out of the car to fire again, the police dog reacted by attacking Prudom, giving Oliver a chance to run for cover in a nearby house. Of the seven bullets that hit Oliver, none was fatal. The dog was shot twice and wounded, but also survived.

Prudom smashed the radio transceiver in Oliver's van and drove it a short distance into the forest before returning and setting fire to the Rover. He then headed into the forest and went to ground once more. Within hours a huge manhunt had commenced in the forest, involving police marksmen, helicopters and one thousand police officers on foot. As darkness fell the search was halted, although police maintained a cordon around the forest throughout the night.

=== 25–26 June – Police search Dalby Forest ===
The search of the forest commenced again at daybreak on 25 June, and again on 26 June, but despite maintaining a cordon throughout police were unable to find any sign of Prudom.

=== 28 June – Identification of Prudom, murder of PS David Winter ===
Although Prudom had given Haigh a false name and no address, he had given his true date of birth. Another officer, PC Martin Hatton, cross-checked outstanding arrest warrants and made the connection between Haigh's written note and the birth date of the suspect, "Barry Edwards". The police searched the address given by "Edwards" and established his true identity. During the search they also found Eddie McGee's No Need To Die manual detailing special forces survival techniques.

Oliver was able to identify his assailant as Prudom from photographs, and latent fingerprints on the burned out vehicle found near Leeds were found to be those of Prudom. Ballistic tests proved that the same gun had been used in the killings of Haigh and Luckett, and the police released Prudom's name to the media as their prime suspect. Prudom became the most wanted man in Britain.

At 14:00, Police Sergeant David Winter, aged 31, and PC Mick Wood received information about a suspicious man seen in the North Yorkshire village of Old Malton, 200 yards from the village police station. Winter challenged Prudom, who produced his pistol and opened fire. Although Winter tried to take cover behind a low wall, he was pursued by Prudom and shot three times and killed, the final shot fired from point-blank range. After then firing at a Guardian journalist and a BBC news crew, Prudom escaped from the scene through a nearby alley. Heavy rain hampered the search efforts for the next two days, and despite the presence of 600 officers, including 100 armed officers, the use of dogs and the Royal Air Force's Westland Wessex helicopters, Prudom eluded capture.

=== 30 June – Eddie McGee joins manhunt ===
Eddie McGee (c. 1938–2002), nicknamed "Jungle Eddie" by colleagues, was a former Physical Training Instructor from the Parachute Regiment and had served as an NCO in 22 Special Air Service Regiment. Having completed twenty-two years of service, McGee had retired from the Army and now operated the National School of Survival, a survival training school near Harrogate. He had authored five books on the subject.

McGee's tracking skills had been learned while living among Australia's indigenous aboriginal people and pygmy groups in Africa. He was married with two sons, both of whom were serving police officers in Yorkshire. Chief Constable Henshaw said of the development, "Now we have somebody looking for him with even more skill in the art of evasion and survival than Barry Edwards has. I am confident we are going to find him".

McGee and a colleague, Eric Longden, joined the manhunt at Dalby Forest and then moved on to Malton, where they followed tracks from Winter's body through the town's Old Manor Moor, Huttons Ambo and Low Hutton areas, escorted by an armed police bodyguard from the Central Firearms Unit. After several hours, the search moved suddenly back to Dalby Forest when police were informed that a camouflaged bivouac shelter had been uncovered in a Forestry Commission plantation.

=== 1 July – Siege of Malton ===
Henshaw ordered "the largest arsenal of weapons ever issued to a British police force" and placed a cordon around Malton, sealing off the town. Although certain that Prudom was still hiding somewhere in the town, police gave regular briefings to the media saying that they were searching for him in Dalby Forest. Inspector Peter Walker later explained: "We wanted him to believe we were seeking him elsewhere. The safety of the public was uppermost in our minds. The media reports were invaluable because they led Prudom to believe that the hunt was concentrated outside the town in Dalby Forest".

=== 3 July – Prudom resurfaces ===
For several days Prudom hid in the countryside around Malton; on 3 July, he entered the home of pensioner Maurice Johnson in East Mount and took him, his wife Bessie and their son Brian as hostages. He ate a meal in the Johnsons' home, which he described as the "last supper", and hid out at the house for eleven hours. "As the night went on, we got talking as though we had known each other for years. He was calling me Brian and my father he was calling dad". Prudom gave Brian a gift of a United States Army paratrooper's ring, and then, believing the area was relatively safe, tied up the family and left the house at 03:15 on 4 July.

=== 4 July – Police locate Prudom ===
Having learned from television reports that McGee was assisting the police, Prudom set a false trail leading away from the Johnson home, then headed back and hid in a makeshift shelter near Malton's tennis club, only 300 yards from the police station which was also the temporary headquarters co-ordinating the manhunt. Around two hours later the Johnsons had managed to free themselves and called the police. McGee picked up Prudom's trail at the Johnson residence and noticed disturbances of fresh dew on the grass, which led him to where Prudom was hiding. A firearms squad from Greater Manchester Police, led by Chief Inspector David Clarkson, was called to the scene and Prudom was told to give himself up. Stun grenades were thrown by the police and, on hearing a gunshot from Prudom's location, Clarkson ordered his officers to open fire. When firing subsided, Prudom was found dead in the hideout.

== Inquest ==
The inquest into Prudom's death was presided over by coroner Michael Oakley. The post mortem was conducted by Siva Sivas, a lecturer in forensic pathology at Leeds University, who reported that there were a total of twenty-one penetrating shotgun wounds to Prudom's body which had "insufficient velocity to enter the body cavity", a .22 bullet fired into the right side of his head which was consistent with a self-inflicted wound, and a further shotgun pellet which had entered through his forehead. Both of the head wounds would have caused instant loss of consciousness and possibly instant death. Oakley summed up the evidence to the jury by saying: "I would submit to you that there is an abundance of evidence to suggest that he fired the shot that killed himself", and the jury took just 18 minutes to return a verdict of suicide.

Prudom was buried in an unmarked grave in Harehills Cemetery, Leeds.

PC Ken Oliver was subsequently awarded a commendation for bravery.

== In the media ==
=== Television ===
The manhunt for Prudom has been the subject of at least two television documentaries:

- Manhunt: Phantom in the Forest – First aired on Britain's ITV2 27 June 2002.
- Manhunt: Search for the Cop Killer – First aired on Britain's Channel 5 25 July 2023.

== In popular culture ==
Oi! band Combat 84 wrote a song titled "Barry Prudom", which was released on 24 September 1983 as the B-side of their Rapist EP, featuring the lyrics: "Barry Prudom, Barry Prudom, He's coming for you with his gun, Barry Prudom, Barry Prudom, He's Public Enemy number one".

== See also ==
- 2010 Northumbria Police manhunt
- Harry Roberts
