= Skrewdriver =

English rock band

- Skrewdriver c. 1977–1978. Left to right: Kevin McKay, Phil Walmsley, Ian Stuart Donaldson, Ron Hartley.

Background information
- Origin: Poulton-le-Fylde, Lancashire, England
- Genres: White power rock; punk rock; oi!
- Years active: 1976–1979; 1982–1993
- Labels: Chiswick; Rock-O-Rama; White Noise
- Past members: Ian Stuart Donaldson; Martin Cross; Merv Shields; Phil Walmsley; Ron Hartley; Kevin McKay; John "Grinny" Grinton; Jim "Sturmfuhrer" Rice; Mark Radcliffe

Skrewdriver were an English rock band formed by Ian Stuart Donaldson in Poulton-le-Fylde, Lancashire, in 1976. Originally a punk band, Skrewdriver changed into a white power skinhead rock band after reuniting in the 1980s. Their original line-up split in January 1979 and Donaldson reformed the band with different musicians in 1982. The new iteration of the band played a leading role in the Rock Against Communism movement.

The band broke up after Donaldson died in a car crash in 1993.

== Career ==
Ian Stuart Donaldson, formerly of the cover band Tumbling Dice, formed Skrewdriver as a punk rock band in Poulton-le-Fylde in 1976. At first, Skrewdriver sported a punk appearance, but they later changed their image to a skinhead look. In 1978, Donaldson moved to Manchester, where he recruited guitarist Glenn Jones and drummer Martin Smith. With Kevin MacKay on bass, this lineup toured extensively and built a strong following, although certain venues were reluctant to book the band because of their reputation as a violent skinhead band. Boomtown Rats frontman Bob Geldof was reportedly knocked unconscious by a friend of Donaldson who believed that Skrewdriver's sound had been sabotaged. Performing largely for a skinhead audience, the first versions of the band released one album and two singles on Chiswick Records. Skrewdriver briefly adopted a rocker/biker-influenced look around the time they released the EP Built Up Knocked Down (1979), which was poorly received.

Donaldson resurrected the band name Skrewdriver in 1982 with a new band line-up. The new band espoused an openly nationalist ideology and eventually became openly supportive of white nationalist groups, after a lengthy period of publicly denying such support. The band released the single "White Power" in 1983 and their second album, Hail the New Dawn, in 1984. Although both Skrewdriver and the band Sham 69 had skinhead followings and racist fans early in their careers, Sham 69 denounced racism and performed at Rock Against Racism concerts. Donaldson eventually aligned himself with neo-Nazism, saying: "I would describe myself as a British National Socialist, not a German one, and so don't think I'm at odds with British patriots." The band became associated with the National Front and British National Party, raising funds for them (and affiliated organisations) through the White Noise record label. They released records on Rock-O-Rama, a label that became known for National Socialist sympathies. Skrewdriver was instrumental in setting up Blood & Honour, a neo-Nazi music promotion network.

Their song "Smash the IRA" became popular amongst Loyalists in Northern Ireland. It was one of a number of Skrewdriver songs covered by a Belfast band called Offensive Weapon, who also covered songs by Black artists such as Chuck Berry.

Some members of the original Skrewdriver line-up objected strongly to the new direction in which Donaldson took the band. Roger Armstrong of Chiswick Records said:

It is a shame that the name was dragged through the gutter like that. The other three guys in the band were really pissed off too. Grinny the drummer came from solid Northern socialist stock. When they made records for us Ian Stuart showed no signs of fascism. The skinhead image was a—maybe in hindsight misconceived—fashion thing. It was cooked up by a bunch of us, including the band's then-management and the photographer Peter Kodik.

However, John "Grinny" Grinton later stated in an interview that he had no problem with the new Skrewdriver, and that he became a member of the National Front along with Donaldson.

Donaldson died in a car crash on 24 September 1993. Donaldson's death catalyzed the demise of Skrewdriver, and had a strong impact on the white power rock scene. John "Grinny" Grinton died from cancer in June 2005.

== Members ==
=== 1977–1979 ===
- Ian Stuart Donaldson – guitar, vocals
- Kevin "Kev" McKay – bass (1976–1978, 1978)
- John Grinton – drums (1976–1978, 1979)
- Phil Walmsley – bass, guitar (1976–1977, 1978)
- Ron Hartley – guitar (1977–1978)
- Mark Radcliffe – drums (1978–1979)
- Gary "Gaz" Chammings – guitar (1978)
- Pete Corley – guitar (1978)
- Chris Cummings – guitar (1978–1979)
- Glen Jones – guitar (1979)
- Martin Smith – drums (1979)

=== 1982–1993 ===
- Ian Stuart Donaldson – guitar, vocals
- Mark French – bass (1982–1984)
- Mark Meeson – guitar (1982–1983)
- Geoff Williams – drums (1982–1983)
- Mark Sutherland – drums (1984–1987)
- Scotty – drums (1984–1987)
- Adam Douglas – guitar (1984–1986)
- Murray Holmes – bass (1984)
- Paul Swain – guitar (1984–1987)
- Steve "Stiv / Iena / A." Roda – bass (1985–1986)
- Mervyn "Big Merv" Shields – bass (1986–1989)
- Martin Cross – guitar (1987–1988)
- Ross McGarry – guitar (?)
- John Burnley – drums (1987–1991)
- Steve "Stigger" Calladine – guitar, piano (1990–1993)
- Jon "Smiley / Icky" Hickson – bass (1990–1993)
- Paul "Mushy" Marshall – drums (1991–1993)
- Mark French
- Geoff Williams
- Mark Neeson
- Joseph Smith
- Murray Holmes
- Dave Wane
- Colin Smith
- Mike French
- Andrew Skinner
- Ford Freemantle

== Discography ==
=== Studio albums ===
- All Skrewed Up (1977) (Chiswick) (later re-issued as The Early Years with extra tracks)
- Hail the New Dawn (1984) (Rock-O-Rama)
- Blood & Honour (1985) (Rock-O-Rama)
- White Rider (1987) (Rock-O-Rama)
- After the Fire (1988) (Rock-O-Rama)
- Warlord (1989) (Rock-O-Rama)
- The Strong Survive (1990) (Rock-O-Rama)
- Freedom What Freedom (1992) (Rock-O-Rama)
- Hail Victory (1994) (Asgard Records – A division of Rock-O-Rama)

=== 12" EPs ===
- Back with a Bang / I Don't Like You (1982) (SKREW1 label)
- White Power (1983) (White Noise Records)
- Boots & Braces (1987) (previously released tracks) (Rock-O-Rama)
- Voice of Britain (1987) (previously released tracks) (Rock-O-Rama)

=== Singles ===
- "You're So Dumb" / "Better Off Crazy" (1977) (Chiswick)
- "Antisocial" / "Breakdown" (1977) (Chiswick)
- "Street Fight" / "Unbeliever" (1977) (Chiswick – recorded but not released)
- "Built Up, Knocked Down" / "Case of Pride" / "Breakout" (1979) (TJM label)
- "White Power" / "Smash the IRA" / "Shove the Dove" (1983) (White Noise)
- "Voice of Britain" / "Sick Society" (1984) (White Noise)
- "Invasion" / "On the Streets" (1984) (Rock-O-Rama)
- "After the Fire" / "Sweet Home Alabama (cover version of Lynyrd Skynyrd)" (1988) (Street Rock'n'Roll)
- "Land of Ice" / "Retaliate" (1988) (Street Rock'n'Roll)
- "Their Kingdom Will Fall" / "Simple Man" (1989) (Street Rock'n'Roll)
- "The Evil Crept In" / "Glory" (1989) (Street Rock'n'Roll)
- "The Showdown" / "Deep Inside" (1990) (White Pride Records)
- "You're So Dumb" / "The Only One" (1990) (Street Rock'n'Roll)
- "Streetfight" / "Where's It Gonna End" (1990) (Street Rock'n'Roll)
- "Stand Proud" / "Backstabber" (1991) (Street Rock'n'Roll)
- "Warzone" / "Shining Down" (1991) (Street Rock'n'Roll)

=== Compilations ===
- Undercover (2007) (collection of cover songs)

=== Live albums ===
- Live Marquee (1977)
- We've Got the Power (1987) (Viking) (live) (reissued on CD with bonus live & demo tracks)
- Live and Kicking (1991) (Rock-O-Rama) (double album)
- Live at Waterloo (1995) (ISD/White Terror) (recorded 12 September 1992)
- This One's for the Skinheads (live, recorded 23 April 1987)
- The Last Gig in Germany (1996)

=== Radio ===
- Peel Session (1977) BBC Radio 1

=== Songs on compilations ===
- "Government Action" on Catch a Wave (1978) – 10-inch 2×LP by NICE
- "You're So Dumb" on Long Shots, Dead Certs and Odds On Favorites (Chiswick Chartbusters Vol.2) (1978) – LP by Chiswick
- "When the Boat Comes In" on This Is White Noise (1983) – 7-inch EP featuring three other bands
- "Boots & Braces" and "Antisocial" on United Skins (1982) – LP by The Last Resort shop
- "Don't Let Them" and "Tearing Down the Wall" on No Surrender (1985) – LP by Rock-O-Rama
- "Land of Ice", "Free Men" and "The New Boss" on Gods of War 1 (1987) – LP by Street Rock & Roll
- "Rising" and "We Can't Be Beaten" on Gods of War 2 (1989) – LP by Street Rock & Roll
- "Antisocial" on The Ugly Truth About Blackpool (2005) – CD by Just Say No to Government Music
- "Night Trains" on Ballads of Blood and Honor (?) – CD by Unknown Grito sudaka

== See also ==
- List of white power music acts
