= Brutal Verschimmelt =

German punk band

Background information
- Origin: Kempten (Allgäu), Germany
- Genres: Punk rock
- Years active: 1981–1983, 2013–present
- Labels: Rock-O-Rama (1983); Höhnie Records (2013)
- Members: Max Spring; Kölsi; Bernhard; Carlo Kallen; Norm
- Past members: Role Rotze; F.
- Website: www.brutalverschimmelt.org

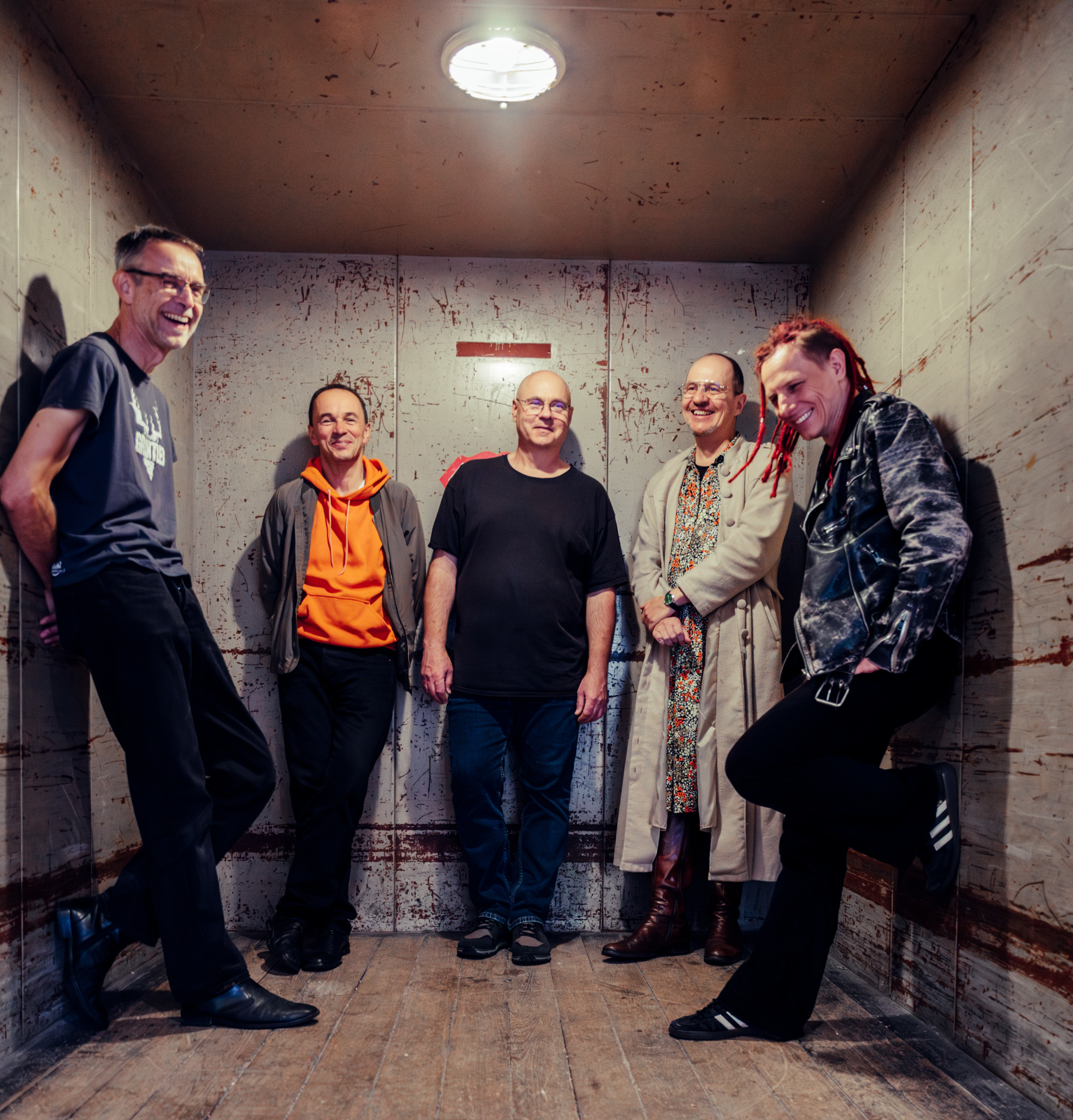
Brutal Verschimmelt (2024)

Brutal Verschimmelt (BV, literally "very moldy", German pronunciation: [bʁuˈtaːl fɐˈʃɪml̩t]) was a German punk band from Kempten (Allgäu). In 1983 they released an album by Rock-O-Rama.

== History ==
In 1980 Carlo Kallen, with some high school friends, founded his first band Adolf Streit & die NS-Verbrecher, which first became Psychorotz and then Brutal Verschimmelt. First concerts took place in Allgäu in the vicinity of the band B.Trug which, being the older punks, brought the younger ones along. B.Trug had at that time a record contract with the punk label Rock-O-Rama from Brühl and referred also Brutal Verschimmelt to that label. A demo recording was sent to Herbert Egoldt who signed the band. Egoldt invited the band in May 1983 to Cologne where they recorded their debut album in 16 hours. Egoldt himself produced the vinyl record. A cover draft showing an anti-war collage was discarded by Egoldt and replaced by a skeleton warrior with a mohawk fighting against some kind of monster. The politically left lyrics of the band were not printed on the lyrics sheet, presumably because at that time Egoldt already fancied with the Rock Against Communism market. The band learned about this first after having received their 100 free records. Hereupon they spray-painted these record covers and added a supplemental sheet on which they explained the issue with the record cover.

Shortly after release of the debut album the band split, after drummer Franz quit and the band didn't find a substitute. Carlo Kallen played later with the Ewings, Chili Confetti and die ueblichen as well as with TLR (Band).

Over the years the record became a sought-after rarity. The album was released for a second time 1990 without telling the band. In January 2013 a new release was published as a double record under the title Und die Zukunft ist doch rot (and the future is red after all) at Höhnie Records. Besides the original album the record contains also the demo tape as well as the a live recording from 25. February 1982. On the occasion of this re-release three of the original members decided to go on a Germany tour as Brutal Verschimmelt with nine concerts in June 2013. Also tours took place in 2014 (until July 12) and 2022 (until October 29). For the 2022 tour, the live LP Schlechtes von gestern (bad things from yesterday) was released with a live recording of the last concert of BV's early 80s phase (on double CD with reiisue of the 1983 LP). In the summer of 2024 – 40 years after the release of their first album – they produced their second studio LP entitled Alles frisch! (everything fresh). It was published by power-it-up from October 2024 as #298. They presented the songs from the new LP on their 4th Germany tour in october 2024.

== Discography ==
- Brutal Verschimmelt (LP, Rock-O-Rama Records) (1983)
- Und die Zukunft ist doch rot (Double LP, Compilation, Höhnie Records) (2013)
- Babylon brennt (Ruts Cover) on the sampler LP Oi - it’s Deutschpunk, Vol1 (2016)
- Ja, ja, ja on the double LP Notdurft-Tribute-Sampler (2018)
- Schlechtes von gestern (Live LP; power-it-up) (2022)
- Der ganze Dreck (Double CD) (2022)
- Alles frisch! (LP; power-it-up) (2024)
- Brutal Verschimmelt discography at Discogs
