= Combat 84 =

English punk rock band

- Also known as: The 7th Cavalry
- Origin: Chelsea, London, England
- Genres: Oi!, punk rock
- Years active: 1981-1984; 2000
- Labels: Victory Records; Rock-O-Rama; 7th Cavalry Records; Step-1 Records
- Members: 'Deptford' John Armitage; Jim Moncur; C.J.
- Past members: 'Chubby' Chris Henderson; Brownie; John Fisher; F.T. Suds

Combat 84 were an English punk rock band who were active during the early 1980s. Formed in 1981 in Chelsea, London, by skinheads 'Chubby' Chris Henderson and 'Deptford' John Armitage, Combat 84 rose to national prominence after being featured in a controversial 1982 BBC Arena documentary about the skinhead movement.

== Career ==
The band was originally composed of Chris Henderson (vocals), 'Deptford' John Armitage (bass guitar), Jim (guitar) and Brownie (drums) and played their first gig supporting The Last Resort at the Walmer Castle, Peckham. The Last Resort's lead singer, Roi Pearce (later of The 4-Skins) liked the band and agreed to produce a two-song demo tape with them. These sessions resulted in the songs "Soldier" and "Combat 84", which were favourably received in the music press, leading to the band being described as 'the new Sham 69'.

In 1982, the manager of The 4-Skins, Gary Hitchcock, attempted to get the band signed to Secret Records, then home to The 4-Skins, The Business, Infa Riot and The Exploited, although the deal fell through at the last minute, prompting Combat 84 to sign to Victory Records for the release of their Orders of the Day EP. Former Business drummer John Fisher replaced Brownie for the recording of the second (1983) EP, Rapist.

Controversy erupted around the band after they were featured in a 1982 BBC Arena documentary, during which Henderson alleged that the police were tougher on White skinheads than they were on Black rioters, said that "there will never be racial harmony" and blamed the Asians for the 1981 Southall riot, during which the band were attacked inside a gig venue. Deptford John briefly made some comments in agreement with Henderson over the riots but, in a later part of the documentary, he said that skinheads should be able to empathise with Blacks when they are denied jobs or entrance to venues, and should remember that, whereas skinheads can change how they look, Blacks cannot change their skin colour. Footage of crowd violence at a gig in Harlow was broadcast at the end of the documentary. This led to the break-up of the band, as their newly earned bad reputation discouraged venues from booking the band. Gigs were then often played under the pseudonym The 7th Cavalry to avoid the stigma of the Combat 84 name.

In 1983, Combat 84 received much criticism for recording a single that advocated capital punishment for rapists ("Rapist"), one accompanying B-side that supported nuclear weapons and criticised the Campaign for Nuclear Disarmament (CND) and reds ("Right to Choose"), and another B-side about the multiple murderer Barry Prudom. Guitarist Jim stated in a 2000 interview that "Right to Choose" was intended in a tongue-in-cheek manner, and as a homage to Vietnam War movies.

Victory Records, wanting little to do with the band at this point, compiled an album of studio recordings (intended for the band's debut album) and bootleg-quality live tracks and licensed it to German label Rock-O-Rama Records (which would later that year establish itself as a neo-Nazi label, releasing debuts by the Böhse Onkelz and Skrewdriver) for release as Send in the Marines in 1984. The record was disowned by the band, which split up soon after. Most of these tracks were included in a double release with the Last Resort in 1987 by Link Records, entitled "Death or Glory".

Some of their live tracks were released by Link Records on the 1989 record, "Send in the Marines".

In the intervening years, Combat 84 were frequently labelled as a neo-Nazi, white power or Rock Against Communism (RAC) band, a charge which has been denied by 'Deptford' John and Jim, noting that the band's songs contained no racist lyrics, nor were they ever aligned with any far-right political party. The band's reputation was made worse by the similarity in name to a neo-Nazi group called Combat 18. 'Deptford' John was able to retain a career by joining The Exploited, whose lyrics on certain issues were different to Combat 84 (e.g. The Exploited were against nuclear weapons), but John noted in a 2001 interview with the "Pissed and Proud" fanzine that he believes in free speech and whilst not supporting it, that RAC music should be allowed a platform as "people should be allowed to say what they want". In his book, Chris Henderson said that the 84 in the name was a reference to George Orwell's book 1984 and that the band adhered to the philosophy of George Orwell.

The band became known late in the USA. The April 2018 issues of Maximumrocknroll began with a debate on the band's merits in the punk scene. The single "Rapist" achieved belated fame in the US punk scene and was re-released in 2019 by Splattered! Records.

=== Aftermath and reunion ===
After retiring from the music business, Chris Henderson became more involved with football hooliganism, and eventually led the Chelsea Headhunters in the mid-1980s, later writing the book Who Wants it? (with Colin Ward) about his experiences. After being cleared in court in the late 1980s of involvement in football violence, Henderson moved to Thailand and owned a bar in Pattaya. He died in London on 31 October 2013.

'Deptford' John and Jim went on to roadie for and play with the UK Subs and The Exploited, and John Fisher played with former members of The Last Resort in The Warriors.

In 2000, the band reformed without Henderson for the release of the Tooled Up EP, released on their own 7th Cavalry record label. 'Deptford' John took over vocal duties, with Jim on guitar, and F.T. and Suds on bass and drums respectively.

On 22 April 2025, the band released "The Sound of Violence", an outtake from the Tooled Up sessions, for streaming and download.

== Discography ==
=== Albums ===
- Send in the Marines (1984)
- Death Or Glory (1987, with The Last Resort)
- Charge of the 7th Cavalry (1989) (posthumous live album, released on Step-1 Records)
- Orders of the Day (2000) (posthumous collection containing all studio recordings, released on Step-1 Records)
- Live And Loud!! - At The 100 Club London Dec. 30th 1982 (2019) (posthumous live album, release on Ink Records)

=== EPs ===
- Orders of the Day (1982)
- Rapist (1983)
- Tooled Up (2000)
- The Sound of Violence (2025)

=== Singles ===
- Soldier (cassette) (1981)
