= Ashling Cole =

American singer

Ashling
- Also known as: "Biscuit" or "Buscuit"
- Born: Ashling Cole; 1974-1975
- Genres: Pop, Soul, Jazz, R&B, gospel,
- Years active: 2008 - present
- Label: San Francisco Records
- Formerly of: Graham Central Station

Ashling Cole is an American singer. She has worked with Carlos Santana, Prince, Marcus Miller, Bootsy Collins and others.

== Background ==
Cole was born between 1974 and 1975 in Vancouver, but her family quickly relocated to Dublin, Ireland. As a teenager she attended City College of San Francisco, and moved to Hollywood in the early 90s.

== Discography ==
Year	Title	Label	Notes
2009	Sweet Feelings	San Francisco Records	As 'Ashling'

=== Guest appearances ===
Year	Artist	Title	Role
2008	The All-American Rejects	When The World Comes Down	Angelic choir on 'Fallin' Apart' & 'Real World'
2009	Tamika Nicole	The Art Of Letting Go	Backing vocals on 'Can't Walk Away'
2010	Huey Lewis And The News	Soulsville	Backing vocalist on 'Soulsville'
2012	Larry Graham & Graham Central Station	Raise Up	Backing Vocals, Percussion
2012	Larry Graham & Graham Central Station	Raise Up EP	Vocals & Funk Box on 'It Ain't No Fun To Me (The New Master)'
2015	Various Artists	Soul Togetherness 2015	On 'Give It To You'
2016	Prince	Montreux Jazz Festival 2013 - 3 Nights, 3 Shows	Vox on 'Love / Raise Up'
2018	Dave Koz, Gerald Albright, Rick Braun, Richard Elliot, Aubrey Logan	Summer Horns II From A To Z	Vocals on 'More Today Than Yesterday', 'Late In The Evening', 'If You Really Love Me', & 'Earth Song'
2018	Darryl Anders Agapésoul	Conversations	Vocals on 'Sweet Sticky Thing'
