= Rainforest Band =

American jam band (1990–2000)

The Rainforest Band was an American jam band that spans several genres, including jazz, rock, world music, R&B, and funk. Founded in 1990, the band produced four albums and performed for ten years.

== History ==
The Rainforest Band began in 1990 with the Grammy Award-nominated album Blues From the Rainforest, a collaboration between jazz keyboardist Merl Saunders, percussionist Muruga Booker, and Grateful Dead guitarist Jerry Garcia, and additionally, Shakti Booker (vocals), Eddie Moore (percussion), Melvin Seals (sound effects) and Bill Thompson (drums and sampled sound MIDI-technician). This fusion of world music and jazz was an early hit in a genre which became a category for the Grammys that same year. The music itself was written by Saunders and Booker, and Garcia added tracks both with electric guitar and MIDI-guitar mimicking flute, while sampled sounds from the Amazon rainforest were incorporated into the music throughout.

Although the album was billed as a Merl Saunders album, in the tour that followed, the group was billed as Rainforest Band, and the album is generally regarded as the first release of the band. For the next ten years they played with an ever-changing line-up of musicians, many from the Grateful Dead family of musicians. They were a favorite Earth Day act; one of their albums was called Save the Planet So We’ll Have Someplace to Boogie, and a familiar chant at performances was “Every Day is Earth Day”.

Their albums were produced by Merl Saunders’s Sumertone Records with a portion of the proceeds going to the Rainforest Action Network. In 1999, a DVD of Blues From the Rainforest was released, containing the entire album from the original masters, concert footage of their September 24, 1990 performance at the Great American Music Hall in San Francisco, a music video of the title track, and the documentary Rediscovering the Amazon, chronicling Saunders’s trip to the Amazon rainforest and raising the issue of rainforest deforestation.

After a nearly ten-year period in which Muruga and Shakti Booker had broken from the band, a reunion took place between Merl Saunders and the Bookers at the Starwood Festival in 2000. This appearance was to be the launching point of a new tour starting at Nelson's Ledges Quarry Park in 2002, while it was to be the last performance of the Rainforest Band with Merl Saunders. However, Merl’s health declined and he suffered a stroke in 2002, after which he took a break to recover. He continues to play with the Jerry Garcia Band (JGB cover band).

Other artists who have performed as part of the Rainforest Band include Tony Saunders, Mike Hinton, Vince Littleton, Larry Vann, Michael Warren, Steve Kimock, Karen Baker, Tammy Tambora, and John Popper.

A re-launch of the Rainforest Band in tribute to Merl Saunders took place at the 29th Starwood Festival on July 25, 2009, featuring Merl’s son bassist Tony Saunders, guitarist Mike Hinton, drummer Bill Norwood, keyboardist Mike Emerson, and vocalist Misa Malone, with Tommy Castro, Elvin Bishop, and Petty Theft. Also appearing were Sikiru Adepoju on talking drum and Douglas "Val" Serrant on steel drum and djembe. Muruga Booker also formed his own version of the Rainforest Band and recorded a CD in 2010 (yet to be released) featuring Badal Roy, Perry Robinson, and the final recordings of James Gurley.

== Discography ==
- 1990: Blues from the Rainforest: A Musical Suite – featuring Muruga and Shakti Booker, Eddie Moore, and special guest Jerry Garcia
- 1991: Save the Planet so We'll have Someplace to Boogie – Merl Saunders & the Rainforest Band
- 1993: It's in the Air – Merl Saunders & the Rainforest Band
- 1998: Fiesta Amazonica – Merl Saunders & the Rainforest Band

== Filmography ==
- 1997: A Tribute to Jerry Garcia: Deadheads Festival Japan 1997 (Japanese Laser Disc, Video Super Rock series VPLR-70650)
- 1999: Blues from the Rainforest: A Musical Suite (Mobile Fidelity, DVD)

== See also ==
- Merl Saunders
