= Elvin Bishop =

American musician (born 1942)

Elvin Richard Bishop
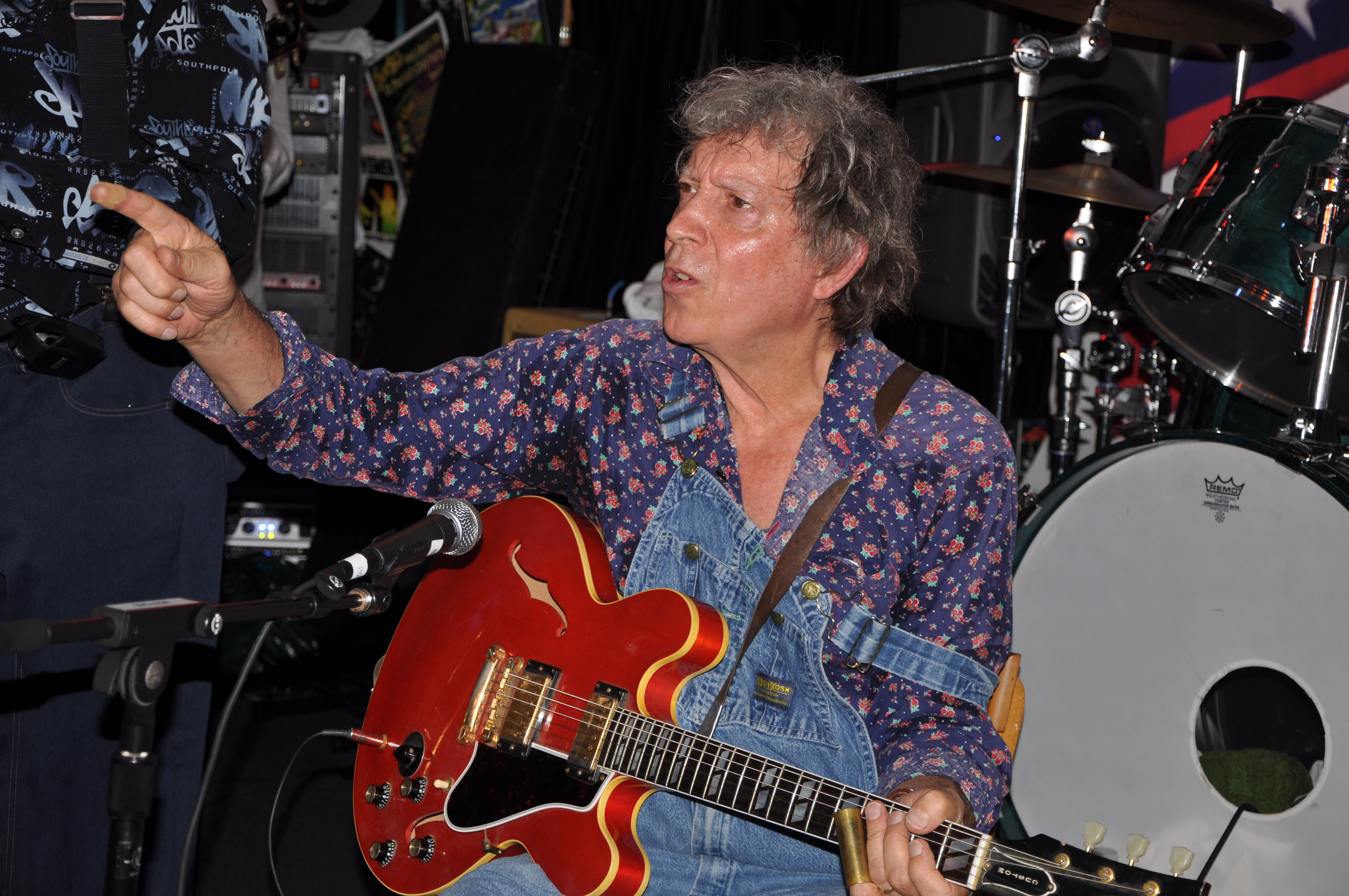
- Bishop performing in 2010

Background information
- Also known as: Pigboy Crabshaw; Bad Boy
- Born: October 21, 1942 (age 84); Glendale, California, U.S.
- Origin: Chicago, Illinois, U.S.
- Genres: Blues; blue-eyed soul; blues rock; country rock; Southern rock
- Occupations: Musician; songwriter
- Instruments: Guitar; vocals
- Years active: 1963–present
- Labels: Capricorn; Blind Pig; Alligator; Delta Groove
- Formerly of: The Paul Butterfield Blues Band
- Website: www.elvinbishopmusic.com

Elvin Richard Bishop (born October 21, 1942) is an American blues and rock music singer, guitarist, bandleader, and songwriter. He was inducted into the Rock and Roll Hall of Fame as a member of the Paul Butterfield Blues Band in 2015, and in the Blues Hall of Fame as a solo artist in 2016.

== Early life and education ==
Bishop was born in Glendale, California, the son of Mylda (nee Kleege) and Elvin Bishop Sr. He grew up on a farm near Elliott, Iowa. His family moved to Tulsa, Oklahoma, when he was 10. There, he attended Will Rogers High School, winning a full scholarship to the University of Chicago as a National Merit Scholar. He moved to Chicago in 1960 to attend the university, where he majored in physics.

== Career ==
In 1963, Bishop met harmonica player Paul Butterfield in the neighborhood of Hyde Park, joined Butterfield's blues band, and remained with them for five years. Bishop was originally Butterfield's only guitarist, but was later joined by Mike Bloomfield, who largely assumed the lead guitar role for the band's first two albums. After Bloomfield departed, the Butterfield Band's third album, The Resurrection of Pigboy Crabshaw, took its name from Bishop's nickname and his renewed role as lead guitarist. Bishop recorded a fourth album, In My Own Dream, with Butterfield, his last with the band, in 1968.

During his time with the Butterfield Blues Band, Bishop met blues guitarist Louis Myers at a show. Bishop persuaded Myers to trade his Gibson ES-345 for Bishop's Telecaster. Bishop liked the Gibson so much, he never gave it back and has used it throughout his career. Bishop has nicknamed his Gibson ES-345 "Red Dog", a name he got from a roadie for the Allman Brothers Band.

In 1968, he went solo and formed the Elvin Bishop Group, also performing with Bloomfield and Al Kooper on their album titled The Live Adventures of Mike Bloomfield and Al Kooper. The group signed with Fillmore Records, which was owned by Bill Graham, who also owned the Fillmore music venues.

Bishop sat in with the Grateful Dead on June 8, 1969, at the Fillmore West in San Francisco. He opened the second set with the lengthy blues jam "Turn on Your Lovelight" without Pigpen or Jerry. He played two more songs with the Dead, "The Things I Used to Do" and "Who's Lovin' You Tonight."

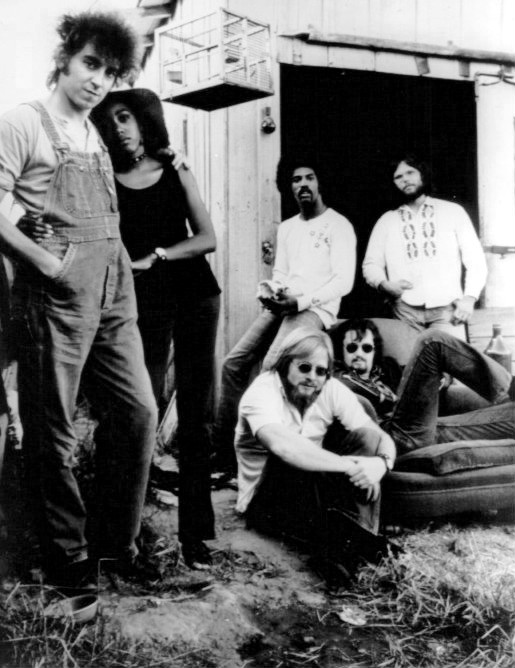
The Elvin Bishop Group in 1975

In March 1971, the Elvin Bishop Group and the Allman Brothers Band co-billed a series of concerts at the Fillmore East. Bishop joined the Allman Brothers Band onstage for a rendition of his own song, "Drunken-Hearted Boy". Over the years, Bishop has recorded with many other blues artists, such as John Lee Hooker, and with Zydeco artist Clifton Chenier. In late 1975, he played guitar for a few tracks on Bo Diddley's The 20th Anniversary of Rock 'n' Roll album and, in 1995, he toured with B.B. King.

Bishop made an impression on album-oriented rock FM radio stations with "Travelin' Shoes" in 1975. In 1976, he released his most memorable single, "Fooled Around and Fell in Love", which peaked at number three in the US Billboard Hot 100 chart (and number 34 in the UK Singles Chart). The recording featured vocalist Mickey Thomas and drummer Donny Baldwin, who both later joined Jefferson Starship.

During the 1960s and 1970s, he recorded for the Fillmore, Epic, and Capricorn labels.

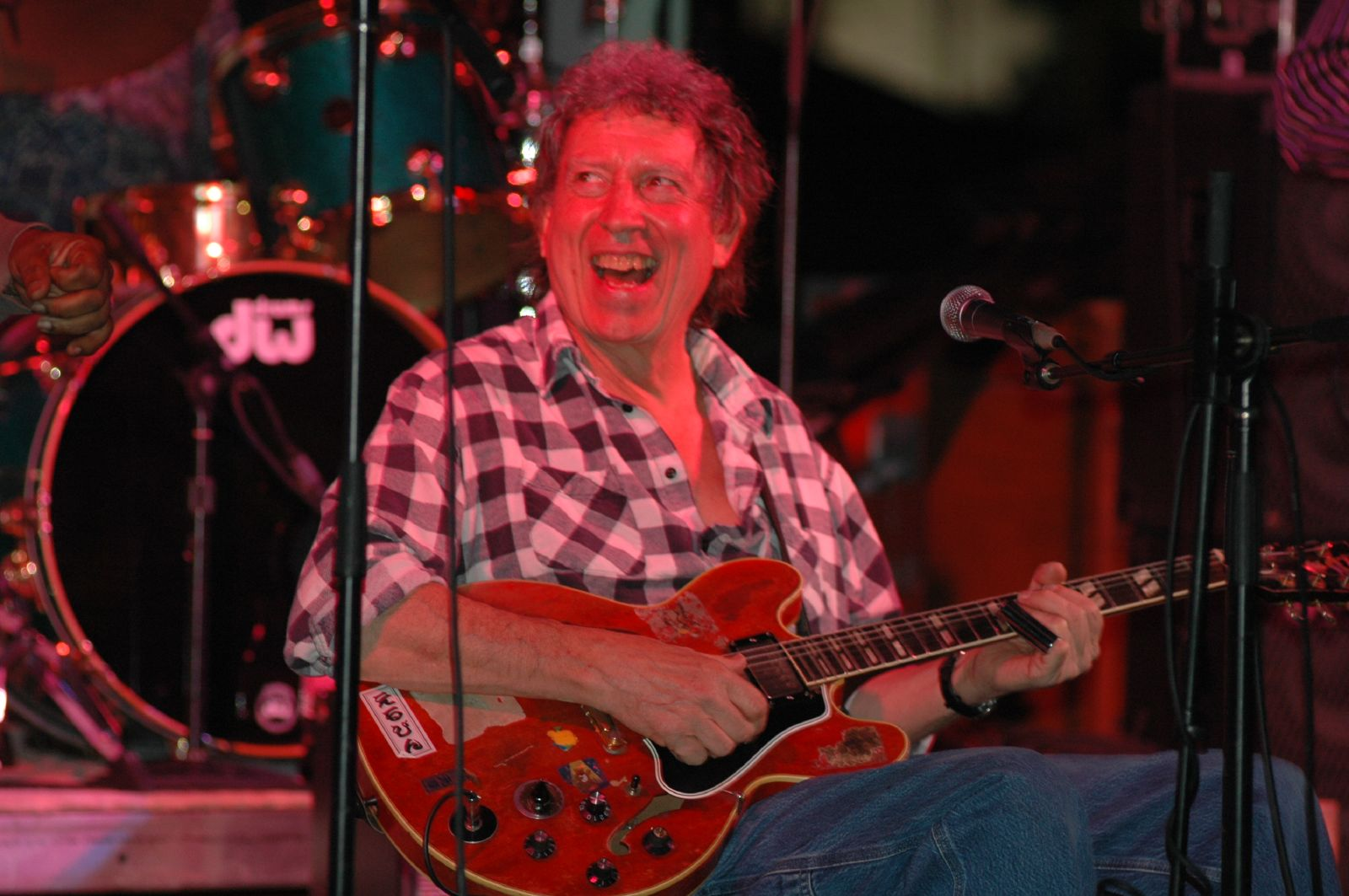
Bishop performing at the Riverwalk Blues Festival, Fort Lauderdale, Florida, in February 2006

Bishop appeared at the 1984 Long Beach Blues Festival. In 1988, he signed with Alligator Records and released Big Fun featuring Whit Lehnberg and the Carptones, 1991's Don't Let the Bossman Get You Down!, 1995's Ace in the Hole, 1998's The Skin I'm In, and That's My Partner (2000), on which he paired with an early Chicago blues teacher, Little Smokey Smothers. He later revisited Smothers in the studio, where the two recorded another album in 2009, Little Smokey Smothers and Elvin Bishop: Chicago Blues Buddies.

Bishop was inducted into the Oklahoma Jazz Hall of Fame in 1998.

In 2005, Bishop released his first new solo CD in seven years, Gettin' My Groove Back. In 2008, Bishop released The Blues Rolls On, on September 23, 2008, switching labels to Delta Groove Music. He was supported by Tommy Castro, James Cotton, Warren Haynes, B.B. King, Derek Trucks, George Thorogood, Kim Wilson, John Németh, and Angela Strehli. The album was nominated for Grammy Award for Best Traditional Blues Album. In 2010, Bishop released Red Dog Speaks.

His first live concert DVD, That's My Thing: Elvin Bishop Live in Concert, was recorded live at the Club Fox in Redwood City, California, on December 17, 2011. It was released on the Delta Groove label in October 2012. The DVD was nominated for Best Blues DVD of 2012 by the Blues Foundation. The same organization announced that Bishop had six nominations for the 36th Blues Music Awards held in May 2015. He triumphed in three of them.

In April 2015, Bishop was inducted into the Rock and Roll Hall of Fame as an original member of the Paul Butterfield Blues Band.

In November 2017, his album Elvin Bishop's Big Fun Trio received a nomination for the Grammy Award for Best Traditional Blues Album. The Grammy was won by the Rolling Stones for Blue and Lonesome.

In November 2021, his album with Charlie Musselwhite, 100 Years of Blues, received a nomination for the Grammy Award for Best Traditional Blues Album. Bishop lost to Cedric Burnside for his album I Be Trying.

== Personal life ==
Bishop's daughter Selina and ex-wife Jennifer Villarin were murdered along with three other victims in an August 2000 crime spree. The perpetrators were later identified as Selina's then-boyfriend Glen Helzer, Helzer's brother Justin Helzer, and accomplice Dawn Godman. The murders reportedly occurred because the perpetrators believed Selina knew they had extorted money from an elderly couple in Concord, California before killing the couple. Selina's mother and her mother's friend were also killed. Both killers were sentenced to death for the murders, while Godman cooperated with police and was sentenced to 25 years to life with possibility of parole. Justin Helzer, blind and partially paralyzed from an attempt on his own life while incarcerated, subsequently committed suicide in San Quentin prison.

== Discography ==
=== Studio albums ===
Year	Album	US	CA	Label
1969	The Elvin Bishop Group	—	—	Fillmore
1970	Feel It!	—	—	Fillmore
1972	Rock My Soul	—	—	Epic
1974	Let It Flow	100	—	Capricorn
1975	Juke Joint Jump	46	53	Capricorn
1975	Struttin' My Stuff	18	22	Capricorn
1976	Hometown Boy Makes Good!	70	—	Capricorn
1978	Hog Heaven	—	—	Capricorn
1981	Is You Is or Is You Ain't My Baby	—	—	Line
1988	Big Fun	—	—	Alligator
1991	Don't Let the Bossman Get You Down!	—	—	Alligator
1995	Ace in the Hole	—	—	Alligator
1998	The Skin I'm In	—	—	Alligator
2005	Gettin' My Groove Back	—		Blind Pig
2008	The Blues Rolls On	—		Delta Groove
2009	Chicago Blues Buddies (with Little Smokey Smothers)	—		Blackderby
2010	Red Dog Speaks	—		Delta Groove
2014	Can't Even Do Wrong Right	—		Alligator
2017	Elvin Bishop's Big Fun Trio	—		Alligator
2018	Something Smells Funky 'Round Here	—		Alligator
2020	100 Years of Blues (with Charlie Musselwhite)	—		Alligator

=== Live albums ===
Year	Album	US	CA	Label
1977	Raisin' Hell: Elvin Bishop Live!	38	62	Capricorn
2000	That’s My Partner! (with Little Smokey Smothers)	—	—	Alligator
2001	King Biscuit Flower Hour Presents Elvin Bishop in Concert	—	—	KBFH Records
2007	Booty Bumpin'	—	—	Blind Pig
2011	Elvin Bishop's Raisin' Hell Revue	—	—	Delta Groove

=== Compilation albums ===
- The Best of Elvin Bishop: Crabshaw Rising (Epic, 1975)
- Sure Feels Good: The Best of Elvin Bishop (Polydor, 1992) Capricorn material
- The Best of Elvin Bishop: Tulsa Shuffle (Epic/Legacy, 1994)
- The Best of Elvin Bishop (20th Century Masters/The Millennium Collection) (Mercury, 2002) Capricorn material
- Party Till the Cows Come Home (Arcadia, 2004)
- She Puts Me in the Mood (Blues Boulevard, 2012) Alligator material

=== Chart singles ===
Year	Single	US	UK	Certification
1974	"Travelin' Shoes"	61	—	
1975	"Sure Feels Good"	83	—	
1976	"Fooled Around and Fell in Love"	3	34	US: Gold
1976	"Struttin' My Stuff"	68	—	
1976	"Spend Some Time"	93	—	

== See also ==
- List of 1970s one-hit wonders in the United States
