= Rock-O-Rama Records =

German record label

Rock-O-Rama Records was a Cologne-based German independent record label that operated between 1980 and 1994, established and run by Herbert Egoldt. Though initially dedicated to releasing and distributing left-wing or apolitical German and international punk and hardcore, Rock-O-Rama became a leading label for white power rock and Rock Against Communism from the middle of the 1980s. Following a 1993 police raid, Egoldt closed the label in 1994 under the threat of legal action from German authorities.

== History ==
Herbert Egoldt began his career in music distribution in the 1970s, selling bootlegged American rockabilly recordings via a mail order service called Big-H. In 1978, Egoldt opened a record store in Cologne to serve the burgeoning punk scene under the name Rock-O-Rama. Two years later, Rock-O-Rama moved into music production and publishing when members of Frankfurt punk band Vomit Visions persuaded Egoldt to issue their first single, "Punks Are the Old Farts of Today" (1980). Thus born, Rock-O-Rama Records continued to publish releases from mostly apolitical or left-wing German punk bands through the early 1980s. In 1983, Egoldt negotiated an agreement with Propaganda Records to also issue releases from their roster of Finnish hardcore bands, and in the same year, Rock-O-Rama signed British punks The Skeptix, the label's first overseas band.

In 1983, Egoldt arranged a deal to distribute English white power rock band Skrewdriver's seven-inch singles on English far-right label White Noise Records. The next year, Rock-O-Rama released Skrewdriver's second album, Hail the New Dawn (1984), as White Noise Records lacked the finances to press a full-length album. Rock-O-Rama also offered the band more extensive distribution than their previous label, which John M. Cotter suggests was instrumental in facilitating their ongoing success, and Timothy S. Brown has argued that Skrewdriver's relationship with Rock-O-Rama catalysed the growth of a neo-Nazi skinhead scene in Germany.

The release of Hail the New Dawn signalled the label's marked shift towards the neo-Fascist music market through the latter half of the 1980s. Egoldt did not himself hold far-right political views, but rather saw the nascent neo-Nazi skinhead movement as a potentially profitable business opportunity. Despite this, Rock-O-Rama became "one of the major labels of Rock Against Communism – without equal in the history of far right rock", in Ana Raposo and Russ Bestley's assessment, and by 1993, the label had become "the world's leading producer and distributor of right-wing and neo-Nazi rock music".

Rock-O-Rama's pivot towards white power music attracted attention from both left-wing activists and German authorities. In 1986, Egoldt closed the Rock-O-Rama shop in Cologne following a demonstration outside the premises organised by left-wing groups, and the Office for the Protection of the Constitution began investigating the label around this time. In the early 1990s, scrutiny of the white power music scene in Germany intensified, in the wake of a wave of anti-immigrant violence (notable incidents from the period include the Rostock and Hoyerswerda riots), expanding popularity of the genre, and an exposé published in Der Spiegel in 1992. This provoked an increased attention interest from German authorities in the scene, and in February 1993, police raided Rock-O-Rama's office in Brühl to gather evidence for a sedition prosecution, confiscating approximately 30,000 CDs, cassette tapes, and records. Egoldt closed the label in 1994, disinclined to risk further legal action. He died of a heart attack in 2005, aged 56, leaving the ownership of the Rock-O-Rama back catalogue, which he possessed the rights to, in limbo. In 2007, the label was purchased by new owners, who have kept operating it to this day, managing to "churn out releases—mostly in the form of reissues—as recently as April [2023]."

Egoldt was known for mercenary business practices throughout the label's period of operation, and "developed a reputation for short-changing the musicians who recorded with Rock-O-Rama" according to Kirsten Dyck. This was true in the years before the label's reorientation towards white power music as well, with frequent complaints of unfavourable contracts, poor production, and interference with cover art.

== Roster ==
- Skrewdriver
- Böhse Onkelz
- Combat 84
- Brutal Verschimmelt
- White American Youth

== See also ==
- List of record labels

== Literature ==
- Björn Fischer: Rock-O-Rama Records: The Outrageous Story Of The Bizarrest Music Label Emerging From The Punk Movement. Tredition, Hamburg 2025, ISBN 978-3-384-55904-3 (Hardcover), ISBN 978-3-384-55905-0 (E-Book)
