= Bear's Sonic Journals: Found in the Ozone =

Live album by Commander Cody and His Lost Planet Airmen
- Released: July 24, 2020
- Recorded: February 27 – March 29, 1970
- Venue: Family Dog at the Great Highway
- Genre: Country; rockabilly; Western swing; blues; boogie-woogie; jump blues
- Length: 153:19
- Label: Owsley Stanley Foundation

Commander Cody chronology
Live from Electric City (2019)	Bear's Sonic Journals: Found in the Ozone (2020)

Bear's Sonic Journals chronology
Bear's Sonic Journals: Dawn of the New Riders of the Purple Sage (2020)	Bear's Sonic Journals: Found in the Ozone (2020)	Bear's Sonic Journals: That Which Colors the Mind (2020)

Bear's Sonic Journals: Found in the Ozone is a two-CD live album by American band Commander Cody and His Lost Planet Airmen. It was recorded in February and March 1970 – more than a year and a half before their first album was released in November 1971 – by audio engineer and LSD chemist Owsley "Bear" Stanley. It was released by the Owsley Stanley Foundation on July 24, 2020.

The Family Dog at the Great Highway was a concert venue in San Francisco run by Chet Helms. On February 27, February 28, and March 1, 1970 Commander Cody and His Lost Planet Airmen played three shows there, as the opening act for the Grateful Dead. On March 27, 28, and 29 they played three more shows there, on the same bill as the Youngbloods. Found in the Ozone contains their complete performance from March 28, along with songs selected from the other five concerts. It includes a total of 41 tracks – 7 original compositions and 34 covers.

The album cover art by Chris Shaw is done in a retro-future, pulp magazine style and is reminiscent of the cover of the band's eponymous fifth album.

== Critical reception ==
Jeff Tamarkin said in Relix, "The group was still finding its way, and the sound quality, while crisp and quite listenable, feels homemade. But don’t let any of that keep you away: This is the most significant Cody release in dozens of years, and its early vintage makes it an essential piece in charting the development of this ever-exciting outfit that tossed together rockabilly, blues, country, boogie-woogie, Western swing and whatever else came their way."

In Tinnitist, Darryl Sterdan wrote, "Singer-pianist George (Commander Cody) Frayne and his crew were one of the more interesting bands of the hippie era, fusing country, rockabilly, western swing, jump blues and more into an infectious amalgam that set the table for outfits like NRBQ.... Admittedly, live Cody albums aren't hard to come by – there are probably at least a dozen on the market. But you won’t find one that sounds better than this."

== Track listing ==
Disc 1

March 28, 1970:

1. "Cajun Fiddle" (Buck Owens, Don Rich) – 3:17
2. "Good Rockin' Tonight" (Roy Brown) – 4:33
3. "Jambalaya (On the Bayou)" (Hank Williams) – 3:19
4. "My Girl Josephine" (Antoine Domino Jr., Dave Bartholomew) – 4:02
5. "What's the Matter Now?" (Billy C. Farlow) – 4:43
6. "Bon Ton Roulet" (Clarence Garlow) – 5:46
7. "Matchbox" (Carl Perkins) – 3:00
8. "Long Black Limousine" (Bobby George, Vern Stovall) – 3:52
9. "Only Daddy That'll Walk the Line" (Jimmy Bryant) – 2:37
10. "Truck Drivin' Man" (Terry Fell) – 2:28
11. "Back to Tennessee" (Farlow, George Frayne) – 3:21
12. "Sleepwalk" (Santo Farina, Johnny Farina) – 4:04
13. "Midnight Shift" (Jimmy Ainsworth, Earl Lee) – 2:54
14. "Blue Suede Shoes" (Perkins) – 4:09
15. "Lost in the Ozone" (Farlow) – 2:36

March 29, 1970:

16. "Sugar Bee" (Cleveland Crochet) – 6:04
17. "Mama Tried" (Merle Haggard) – 2:42
18. "Boppin' the Blues" (Perkins, Howard "Curly" Griffin) – 3:28
19. "Hot Rod Lincoln" (Charlie Ryan, W.S. Stevenson) – 2:50
20. "Riot in Cell Block #9" (Jerry Leiber, Mike Stoller) – 2:50
21. "Rip It Up" (Robert Blackwell, John Marascalco) – 3:23

Disc 2

February 27, 1970:

1. "Lawdy Miss Clawdy" (Lloyd Price) – 3:35
2. "I'm as Free as the Breeze" (Ernest Tubb) – 2:56
3. "(I'm Gonna) Burn That Woman" (Farlow) – 3:54
4. "I'm a Long Gone Daddy" (Williams) – 4:06
5. "Big River" (Johnny Cash) – 3:07
6. "I'm Feeling Bad" (Bob Wills) – 3:27
7. "Stranded in the Jungle" (Ernestine Smith, James Johnson) – 4:30

February 28, 1970:

8. "Baby Let's Play House" (Arthur Gunter) – 3:01
9. "Looking at the World Through a Windshield" (Jerry Chesnut, Mike Hoyer) – 2:44

March 1, 1970:

10. "I'm Coming Home" (Johnny Horton) – 3:10
11. "Hello Trouble" (Orville Couch, Eddie McDuff) – 2:26
12. "Wine Do Yer Stuff" (Farlow, Frayne) – 4:02
13. "I Can" (Lee Fykes) – 3:19
14. "Long Distance Call" (McKinley Morganfield) – 9:00
15. "Dark Eyes" (traditional) – 1:08
16. "I Ain't Got Nothing But Time" (Williams) – 5:06
17. "Shout Bamalama" (Otis Redding) – 4:23

March 27, 1970:

18. "Flip, Flop, and Fly" (Charles Calhoun, Joseph Vernon Turner Jr.) – 5:33
19. "Seeds and Stems (Again)" (Farlow, Frayne) – 4:22
20. "I Took Three Bennies (And My Semi-Truck Won't Start)" (Farlow, Bill Kirchen) – 2:56

== Personnel ==
Commander Cody and His Lost Planet Airmen

- George Frayne (Commander Cody) – piano, vocals
- Billy C. Farlow – vocals, harmonica
- Bill Kirchen – guitar, vocals
- Andy Stein – fiddle
- Steve Davis (The West Virginia Creeper) – pedal steel guitar
- Paul "Buffalo" Bruce Barlow – bass
- Lance Dickerson – drums

Production

- Recording: Owsley Stanley
- Mastering: Jeffrey Norman
- Tape to digital transfers: John Chester, Jamie Howarth
- Booklet and packaging design: Bob Minkin
- Cover illustration: Christopher Shaw
- Additional artwork: Owsley Stanley, Commander Cody
- Photography: John Grissim
- Liner notes essay "Commander Cody and His Lost Planet Art Project" by Nicholas G. Meriwether
- Liner notes essay "Under the Headset: No Clusterfuck Jams" by Hawk
