= We've Got a Live One Here! =

Live album by Commander Cody and His Lost Planet Airmen
- Released: 1976
- Recorded: January 24 – February 2, 1976
- Venue: Town Hall, Aylesbury; Hammersmith Odeon, London; Oxford Polytechnic, Oxford
- Genre: Western swing; progressive country
- Length: 63:03
- Label: Warner Bros. Records
- Producer: Tom Anderson

Commander Cody chronology
Tales from the Ozone (1975)	We've Got a Live One Here! (1976)	Rock 'n Roll Again (1977)

We've Got a Live One Here! is an album by American country band Commander Cody and His Lost Planet Airmen. Recorded live in England in January and February 1976, it was released later that year as a two-disc LP. The group's second live album, and seventh album overall, it reached #170 on the Billboard 200 sales chart.

== Critical reception ==
On AllMusic, Jana Pendragon wrote, "Always extraordinary, the era of Commander Cody & His Lost Planet Airmen was a special moment in time that created a place for hipsters, cosmic cowboys, rednecks, and the working class to all come together and enjoy some real American music. Never will there be another band like this one or recordings like the ones they made between 1971 and 1976"

In All About Jazz, C. Michael Bailey said, "The music they played was plainly Western swing – a musically alchemic concoction made up of equal parts country, western, blues, big band jazz, whiskey and reefer.... Like many other "American roots" musics, Western swing enjoyed a renewed interest in the 1970s and there were no better providers than Commander Cody and his Lost Planet Airmen."

When the album was released, Cash Box magazine wrote, "Commander Cody and His Lost Planet Airmen were pioneers of progressive country. This package reflects the depth of understanding and the group's interpretation of the sound that has become the "in" thing."

== Track listing ==
Side A

1. "One of Those Nights" (George Frayne, Billy C. Farlow, Bill Kirchen) – 2:10
2. "Semi Truck" (Farlow, Kirchen) – 2:21
3. "Smoke! Smoke! Smoke!" (Merle Travis, Tex Williams) – 3:43
4. "Big Mammau" (Link Davis) – 3:40
5. "San Antonio Rose" (Bob Willis) – 5:10

Side B

1. "18 Wheels" (Norton Buffalo) – 3:29
2. "Mama Hated Diesels" (Kevin "Blackie" Farrell) – 4:46
3. "Lookin' at the World Through a Windshield" (Jerry Chesnut, Mike Hoyer) – 2:09
4. "My Window Faces the South" (Abner Silver, Jerry Livingston, Mitchell Parish) – 1:52
5. "Milk Cow Blues" (Kokomo Arnold) – 4:07

Side C

1. "It Should've Been Me" (Eddie Curtis) – 2:09
2. "Back to Tennessee" (Frayne, Farlow) – 3:55
3. "Seeds and Stems" (Frayne, Farlow) – 3:35
4. "Rock That Boogie" (Frayne, Farlow) – 2:43
5. "Riot in Cell Block Number 9" (Jerry Leiber, Mike Stoller) – 3:45

Side D

1. "Don't Let Go" (Jesse Stone) – 2:58
2. "Too Much Fun" (Kirchen, Farlow) – 3:24
3. "Hot Rod Lincoln" (Charlie Ryan, W.S. Stevenson) – 4:25
4. "Lost in the Ozone" (Farlow) – 2:42

== Personnel ==
Commander Cody and His Lost Planet Airmen

- Commander Cody (George Frayne) – piano, vocals
- Billy C. Farlow – vocals
- Bill Kirchen – guitar, trombone, vocals
- Rick Higginbotham – guitar
- Bobby Black – pedal steel guitar
- Andy Stein – fiddle, tenor saxophone
- Norton Buffalo – harmonica, trombone, vocals
- Bruce Barlow – bass guitar, vocals
- Lance Dickerson – drums, vocals

Production

- Produced by Tom Anderson
- Co-production: Bill Kirchen, Rick Higginbotham
- Recording and remix engineering: Tom Anderson
- Mixing assistance: Rich Ehrman
- Mastering: George Horn
- Art direction: Ed Thrasher
- Design, illustration: John Van Hamersveld
