= Hot Licks, Cold Steel & Truckers Favorites =

Hot Licks, Cold Steel & Truckers' Favorites

Studio album by Commander Cody and His Lost Planet Airmen
- Released: May 1972
- Recorded: February–March 1972
- Studio: Peninsula Sound Studios, San Carlos, California
- Genre: Country rock
- Label: Paramount (original); MCA (reissue)

Commander Cody and His Lost Planet Airmen chronology
Lost in the Ozone (1971)	Hot Licks, Cold Steel & Truckers' Favorites (1972)	Country Casanova (1973)

Professional ratings
Review scores
Source	Rating
Allmusic	3.5/5 stars
Christgau's Record Guide	B+

Hot Licks, Cold Steel & Truckers' Favorites is the second album by American band Commander Cody and His Lost Planet Airmen. The album is an ode to truckers and songs about trucking, mixing classics of the genre like "Truck Drivin' Man" and "Looking at the World Through a Windshield" with the band's originals. It was released in 1972.

It was also their second album to chart. Reaching a slightly worse position than their last album, peaking at No. 94 on the Billboard Top LPs.

== Critical reception ==
On AllMusic, Jana Pendragon wrote, "Again, a groundbreaking release from the wildest band in country music during the '70s.... With originals and some oldies, the Commander and his band make a big sound that is still reverberating through time.... As with Lost in the Ozone, this is top-flight music in every regard that shows another side to this great band."

Robert Christgau wrote, "This rocks and wails with almost all the coherence and feeling of the rockabilly it takes off from..."

== Track listing ==
Side A

1. "Truck Stop Rock" (Billy Farlow, Bill Kirchen, Bruce Barlow, George Frayne, Andy Stein)
2. "Truck Drivin' Man" (Terry Fell)
3. "Rip It Up" (John Marascalco, Robert Blackwell)
4. "Cravin' Your Love" (Billy Farlow, Andy Stein)
5. "It Should've Been Me" (Memphis Curtis)
6. "Watch My .38" (Billy Farlow, Carl Spelbring)

Side B

1. "Semi-Truck" (Billy Farlow, Bill Kirchen)
2. "Kentucky Hills of Tennessee" (Billy Farlow, Michael James Richards)
3. "Looking at the World Through a Windshield" (Jerry Chesnut, Mike Hoyer)
4. "Diggy Liggy Lo" (J. D. "Jay" Miller)
5. "Mama Hated Diesels" (Kevin "Blackie" Farrell)
6. "Tutti Frutti" (Little Richard, Dorothy LaBostrie) – recorded live at Mandrake's, Berkeley, California

== Personnel ==
Commander Cody and His Lost Planet Airmen

- George Frayne (Commander Cody) – piano, vocals, lead vocals on "It Should've Been Me"
- Billy C. Farlow – harmonica, vocals, lead vocals on "Truck Stop Rock", "Truck Drivin' Man", "Rip It Up", "Cravin' Your Love", "Watch My .38", "Semi-Truck", "Tutti Frutti"
- Bill Kirchen – lead guitar, vocals, lead vocals on "Looking at the World Through a Windshield", "Mama Hated Diesels"
- John Tichy – rhythm guitar, vocals, lead vocals on "Kentucky Hills of Tennessee", "Diggy Liggy Lo"
- Bobby "Blue" Black – pedal steel guitar
- Andy Stein – fiddle, saxophone
- "Buffalo" Bruce Barlow – bass, acoustic bass
- Lance Dickerson – drums

Production

- Recording, mixing: Dale Lear
- Cover art: Chris Frayne
- Photography: Paul Noel

== Charts ==
Chart (1972)	Peak position
US Billboard Top LPs	96
