= Live from Deep in the Heart of Texas =

Live album by Commander Cody and His Lost Planet Airmen
- Released: March 1974
- Recorded: November 1973
- Venue: Armadillo World Headquarters; Austin, Texas
- Genre: Country
- Length: 42:33
- Label: Paramount Records (original); MCA (reissue)
- Producer: Steve Jarvis

Commander Cody and His Lost Planet Airmen chronology
Country Casanova (1973)	Live from Deep in the Heart of Texas (1974)	Commander Cody and His Lost Planet Airmen (1975)

Live from Deep in the Heart of Texas is an album by American country music band Commander Cody and His Lost Planet Airmen. It was recorded live at the Armadillo World Headquarters in Austin, Texas in November 1973, and released in 1974. Unlike many live albums, it contains mostly new material and features only two previously released songs. It reached #105 on the Billboard 200 album sales chart.

The album cover art is by Jim Franklin and depicts a flood of armadillos overwhelming a concert stage. More songs recorded at the Armadillo World Headquarters during these concerts were released on later albums, such as Sleazy Roadside Stories, but Live from Deep in the Heart of Texas is considered by many fans to be the group's best album.

== Critical reception ==
Professional ratings
Review scores
Source	Rating
Allmusic	4.5/5 stars
Christgau's Record Guide	B+

On AllMusic, Jana Pendragon said, "This is Commander Cody & His Lost Planet Airmen at their best, live on-stage and out on the road with the New Riders of the Purple Sage. What a bill and what a grand time for a live album. This is how it really was – wild, loud, and fun. Again, they intersperse their own songs with old favorites.... Every cut is perfection, every cut is substantial."

In the Los Angeles Times, Buddy Seigal wrote, "Live, this band was definitely in its element... Bill Kirchen was one of the most underrated guitarists of the '70s, Bobby Black remains one of the top steel players in the world, and the Commander himself is no slouch on the 88s, but to dissect and analyze this music too much is to defeat its purpose. Crank this sucker up at a lagging social affair, and you’ve got instant party."

Robert Christgau said, "The rockers are hot, the slow ones are soulful, and the whole thing does justice to the endearingly sloppy shuffle of a band that refuses to be pretentious about its lack of pretensions."

When the album was released, Cash Box magazine wrote, "The irrepressible Commander is at it again, and this LP is a stunning collection of some strong material done with the unique country style the group has become so popular with.... They have succeeded in the difficult task of capturing their essence on record in this collection and should be praised for it."

== Track listing ==
Side A

1. "Armadillo Stomp" (Andy Stein, Rick Higginbotham) – 2:00
2. "Good Rockin' Tonight" (Roy Brown) – 2:46
3. "I'm Coming Home" (Johnny Horton) – 2:42
4. "Seeds and Stems Again Blues" (George Frayne, Billy C. Farlow) – 4:03
5. "Sunset on the Sage" (Michael J Richards) – 4:45
6. "Little Sally Walker" (C.F. Turner) – 2:26
7. "Git It" (Bob Kelly) – 2:27

Side B

1. "Oh Mama Mama" (Frayne, Farlow, John Tichy) – 4:29
2. "Crying Time" (Buck Owens) – 3:09
3. "Diggy Liggy Lo" (J. D. "Jay" Miller) – 2:28
4. "Riot in Cell Block #9" (Jerry Leiber, Mike Stoller) – 3:15
5. "Too Much Fun" (Farlow, Bill Kirchen) – 3:26
6. "Mean Woman Blues" (Claude Demetrius) – 4:37

== Personnel ==
Commander Cody and His Lost Planet Airmen

- George Frayne (Commander Cody) – piano, keyboards, vocals
- Billy C. Farlow – harmonica, vocals
- Bill Kirchen – guitar, vocals
- John Tichy – guitar, vocals
- Lance Dickerson – drums, vocals
- Bruce Barlow – bass, vocals
- Andy Stein – violin, saxophone
- Bobby Black – steel guitar, vocals

Production

- Producer: Steve Jarvis
- Recording: Gabby Garcia, Ken Caliat, Bill Broms, Jerry Stroud
- Studio engineers: Steve Jarvis, Steve Montoani
- Album cover art: Jim Franklin
- Photography: J.D. Black, Melinda Wickman, Coy Featherstone
