= Commander Cody and His Lost Planet Airmen (album) =

Studio album by Commander Cody and His Lost Planet Airmen
- Released: 1975
- Recorded: September–October 1974; by Paul Grupp at Record Plant, Sausalito, California, computer mixed at Record Plant, Los Angeles
- Label: Warner Bros. 1975; Wounded Bird 2003
- Producer: John Boylan

Commander Cody and His Lost Planet Airmen chronology
Live from Deep in the Heart of Texas (1974)	Commander Cody and His Lost Planet Airmen (1975)	Tales from the Ozone (1976)

Commander Cody and His Lost Planet Airmen is the fifth album by American country band Commander Cody and His Lost Planet Airmen. Released in 1975, it was their first album for Warner Bros. Records.

The album was the subject of the 1977 book Star-Making Machinery by Geoffrey Stokes, which chronicled its recording, production and marketing as an example of the behind-the-scenes operation of the U.S. music industry in the 1970s.

== Critical reception ==
Professional ratings
Review scores
Source	Rating
Allmusic	4/5 stars
Christgau's Record Guide	C+
Music Week	2/4 stars

On AllMusic, Jana Pendragon wrote, "... this is another good outing for the wild boys.... One more time, this band holds all the aces and plays every hand with a poker face that just won't quit. Commander Cody & His Lost Planet Airmen knew exactly what they were doing."

== Star-Making Machinery ==
This was Cody's first album for Warner Bros. Records after leaving Paramount Records. Warners believed their twang-laden style, rooted in rockabilly, honky-tonk, vintage rhythm & blues and western swing was limiting their appeal. The label decided to move the group in a mellow, California country-rock style more akin to Poco, The Eagles and other bands rooted in folk and bluegrass.

The book Star-Making Machinery: The Odyssey of an Album by Geoffrey Stokes chronicled the actual recording sessions. Stokes embedded himself with the band and witnessed the conflicts that took place between the musicians and producer. Members of the Airman were conflicted. They preferred their original style, but were anxious for greater commercial success after years of struggle. Their producer, John Boylan, a veteran deeply rooted in West Coast country-rock, was attempting to guide them toward the softer sound, which resulted in conflicts during the recording process. Other critics who reviewed the album at the time were far less enthused about it, as was the band itself.

== Track listing ==
Side A

1. "Southbound" (Hoyt Axton, Mark Dawson) – 2:20
2. "Don't Let Go" (Jesse Stone) – 2:40
3. "California Okie" (Kevin "Blackie" Farrell) – 2:48
4. "Willin'" (Lowell George) – 3:38
5. "The Boogie Man Boogie" (Michael J. Richards, Billy C. Farlow, George Frayne, John Tichy) – 3:35

Side B

1. "Hawaii Blues" (Richards, Farlow, Ernie Hagar, Andy Stein) – 3:05
2. "House of Blue Lights" (Don Raye, Freddie Slack) – 2:41
3. "Keep On Lovin' Her" (Farlow, Tichy) – 3:13
4. "Devil and Me" (Frayne, Tichy) – 3:11
5. "Four or Five Times" (Marco H. Hellman, Byron Gay) – 2:30
6. "That's What I Like About the South" (Andy Razaf) – 2:35

== Personnel ==
Commander Cody and His Lost Planet Airmen

- Commander Cody (a.k.a. George Frayne) – piano, vocals
- Billy C. Farlow – lead vocal, harp
- Bill Kirchen – electric guitar, vocals
- John Tichy – rhythm guitar, vocals
- Andy Stein – fiddle, saxophone
- Ernie Hagar – pedal steel
- Bruce Barlow – bass, vocals
- Lance Dickerson – drums, vocals

Additional musicians

- Tower Of Power Horn Section – horns

Production

- John Boylan – Producer
- Paul Grupp – Engineer
- Tom Anderson – Assistant Engineer,
- Bob Edwards – Assistant Engineer
- Michael Verdick – Assistant Engineer
- Wally Traugott – Mastering
- Chris Frayne – Cover Art
- John Goodchild – Layout Design
