= It Should've Been Me =

It Should've Been Me may refer to:

- It Should've Been Me (album), an album by Zoot Money's Big Roll Band
- "It Should've Been Me" (Memphis Curtis song), sung by Ray Charles 1954
- "It Should Have Been Me" (Norman Whitfield song) for Kim Weston 1963, Gladys Knight 1968
- "Should've Been Me", 1987 song by Tiffany from Tiffany
- "Should've Been Me" (Naughty Boy song)
- "Should've Been Me", debut single by Citizen Way
