= Country Casanova =

Studio album by Commander Cody and His Lost Planet Airmen
- Released: May 1973
- Recorded: 1973
- Length: 27:36
- Label: Paramount Records (original); MCA (reissue)
- Producer: Stephan Jarvis

Commander Cody and His Lost Planet Airmen chronology
Hot Licks, Cold Steel & Truckers Favorites (1972)	Country Casanova (1973)	Live from Deep in the Heart of Texas (1974)

Professional ratings
Review scores
Source	Rating
Allmusic	3/5 stars
Christgau's Record Guide	B−

Country Casanova is the third album by American band Commander Cody and His Lost Planet Airmen. It was released in 1973 on Paramount Records.

The album was originally available on LP and 8-track, and later cassette. In 1991, it was released on CD.

Country Casanova is highlighted by the band's classic cover version of "Smoke! Smoke! Smoke! (That Cigarette)." "Everybody's Doin' It" is a revised cover of "Everybody's Truckin'", a 1937 song by the Texas Western swing band The Modern Mountaineers. It, too included "fuckin'" in the lyric, a trick pulled by pianist-vocalist Smokey Wood. Commander Cody copied the original arrangement at a slightly faster tempo and removed the original's reference to "darkies." The cover reportedly got Commander Cody banned from some country music stations because it includes the word "fuckin'" repeated several times, band leader George Frayne claimed in the liner notes of Too Much Fun: The Best of Commander Cody and His Lost Planet Airmen.

== Album cover ==
The album cover shows George Frayne, a.k.a. "The Commander", leaning against a White 1962 or 1963 Lincoln Continental with suicide doors. The car is backed up to a fence, and there is a donkey off to the left of the car. According to The Commander, the Donkey's name was also George. The Lincoln belonged to the famous Rock & Roll photographer Jim Marshall, who took the picture for the album cover.

== Back cover ==
The back cover of the album features the band standing in front of their tour bus, which was a 1950s Greyhound Scenicruiser (double decker) in its past life. The bus is pulled off to the side of a road...somewhere...and to the right of the bus, in the background, you can see what looks like a blue and white Ford pickup truck cruising down the road. If you notice, Commander Cody can be seen holding a drink of some sort in this picture. Band members are displayed left to right, front to rear, as noted: Andy Stein (fiddle, saxophone) Billy C. Farlow (Lead Vocal) (both sitting on an instrument case) behind them, standing, left to right, we have Bill Kirchen (Lead guitar and banjo, lead vocal on "My Window Faces The South" and "Honeysuckle Honey") (On the original LP release, as well as the MCA CD issue of this album Kirchen's name is spelled "Kircher", which is incorrect.) Lance Dickerson (Drums) Bruce Barlow: (Fender and Stand-up Bass) John Tichy: (Rhythm Guitar and Lead Vocal on "Shall We Meet" and "Sister Sue") Bobby Black: (Pedal Steel guitar and Dobro) Commander Cody: (Piano and Lead Vocal on "Smoke! Smoke! Smoke! That Cigarette").

== Track listing ==
Side A

1. "Country Casanova"* (Billy Farlow, Michael J. Richards) – 2:38
2. "Shall We Meet (Beyond the River)" (Traditional, arranged by Billy Farlow, John Tichy, Andy Stein) – 4:21
3. "My Window Faces The South" (Jerry Livingston, Mitchell Parish, Abner Silver) – 1:54
4. "One Man's Meat (Is Another Man's Poison)"* (John Tichy, Bruce Barlow, George Frayne, Billy C. Farlow) – 2:46
5. "Everybody's Doin' It" (George Frayne, Bruce Barlow, Andy Stein, Billy C. Farlow, Bill Kirchen, Lance Dickerson, John Tichy, Bobby Black) – 2:05

Side B

1. "Rock That Boogie" (George Frayne, Bruce Farlow) – 2:48
2. "Rave On!" (Norman Petty, Bill Tilghman, Sonny West) – 2:12
3. "Smoke! Smoke! Smoke! (That Cigarette)" (Merle Travis, Tex Williams) – 3:41
4. "Sister Sue" (John Tichy, Bruce Barlow, Andy Stein, Billy C. Farlow) – 2:41
5. "Honeysuckle Honey"* (Michael J. Richards) – 2:30

*Indicates songs that the band never performed live.

== Personnel ==
Commander Cody and His Lost Planet Airmen

- Commander Cody (George Frayne) – piano, lead vocal on "Smoke! Smoke! Smoke! That Cigarette"
- Billy C. Farlow – lead vocals, harmonica
- Bill Kirchen – lead guitar, banjo, lead vocal on "My Window Faces The South" and "Honeysuckle Honey"
- John Tichy – rhythm guitar, lead vocal on "Shall We Meet" and "Sister Sue"vocals
- Lance Dickerson – drums
- Bruce Barlow – bass guitar, stand-up bass
- Andy Stein – fiddle, saxophone
- Bobby Black – pedal steel guitar, dobro

Production

- Produced by Stephan Jarvis
- Recording: Valerie Mallary and Steve
- Photography: Jim Marshall
- Cover art: Chris Frayne
- Art direction: tony Lane
