= Lost in the Ozone =

Studio album by Commander Cody and His Lost Planet Airmen
- Released: November 1971
- Recorded: 1971
- Venue: Long Branch Saloon (Ann Arbor), New Monk (Berkeley)
- Studio: Pacific High (San Francisco)
- Genre: Country rock; rockabilly; Western swing
- Length: 38:25
- Label: Paramount (original); MCA (reissue)
- Producer: Bob Cohen, George Frayne

Commander Cody and His Lost Planet Airmen chronology
Lost in the Ozone (1971)	Hot Licks, Cold Steel & Truckers Favorites (1972)

Lost in the Ozone is the debut album album by American country rock band Commander Cody and His Lost Planet Airmen, released in November of 1971. It contains their hit cover version of "Hot Rod Lincoln" as well as the band's live staples "Lost in the Ozone" and "Seeds and Stems (Again)".

== Critical reception ==
Professional ratings
Review scores
Source	Rating
AllMusic	3/5 stars
Christgau's Record Guide	B
The Rolling Stone Album Guide	3/5 stars
The Village Voice	B−

On AllMusic, Jana Pendragon said, "This is the monumental debut by one of insurgent country's pioneer bands. Playing with electric instruments, including the all important steel and fiddle, and a good dose of irreverence allowed the band to adhere to their own agenda. This first release was only a taste of the things to come."

Robert Christgau said, "Cody takes the country-rock idea that good old boys form a secret counterculture to bleary new heights. Uprooted bozos who handle fast cars and hot music (or vice versa) a lot better than wimmin and booze, they're half at home in every renegade country tradition, rockabilly and Western swing and white boogie-woogie."

== Track listing ==
Side A

1. "Back to Tennessee" (Billy C. Farlow, George Frayne) – 2:45
2. "Wine Do Yer Stuff" (Farlow, Frayne) – 3:03
3. "Seeds and Stems (Again)" (Farlow, Frayne) – 3:45
4. "Daddy's Gonna Treat You Right" (Farlow) – 3:00
5. "Family Bible" (Paul Buskirk, Walt Breeland, Claude Gray) – 3:39
6. "Home in My Hand" (Ronnie Self) – 2:52

Side B

1. "Lost in the Ozone" (Farlow) – 2:07
2. "Midnight Shift" (Earl Lee, Jimmie Ainsworth,) – 2:27
3. "Hot Rod Lincoln" (Charlie Ryan, W.S. Stevenson) – 2:44
4. "What's the Matter Now?" [live] (Farlow) – 4:02
5. "Twenty Flight Rock" [live] (Ned Fairchild) – 2:57
6. "Beat Me Daddy, Eight to the Bar" [live] (Don Raye, Hughie Prince, Eleanore Sheehy) – 5:08

== Personnel ==
Commander Cody and His Lost Planet Airmen

- Commander Cody (George Frayne) – piano, lead vocals on "Hot Rod Lincoln"
- John Tichy – rhythm guitar, harmony vocals, lead vocals on "Family Bible" and "Beat Me Daddy"
- Andy Stein – fiddle, saxophone
- Lance Dickerson – drums
- "Buffalo" Bruce Barlow – Fender bass, acoustic bass on "Midnight Shift", harmony vocals
- Bill Kirchen – lead guitar, trombone, harmony vocals, lead vocals on "Seeds and Stems" and "Home in My Hand"
- Billy C. Farlow – lead vocals, harmonica
- West Virginia Creeper (Steve Davis) – pedal steel guitar
- Jack Black – backing vocals, guitar on "What's the Matter Now?"

Production

- Bob Cohen – producer, engineer
- Commander Cody (George Frayne) – producer
- Phil Sawyer – mixing
- Chris Frayne – front cover
- Dennis Anderson – rear cover photograph
- Studio cuts recorded at Pacific High Recording, San Francisco
- "What's the Matter Now?" and "20 Flight Rock" recorded live at the Long Branch Saloon and New Monk in Berkeley, July 1971
- "Beat Me Daddy" recorded at Ann Arbor, Michigan by Morgan Sound, April 1971

== Chart positions ==
=== Weekly charts ===
Album

Chart (1972)	Peak position
Canadian Top Albums	75
Billboard Top LPs	82

Singles

Title	Chart (1972)	Peak position
"Hot Rod Lincoln"	Billboard Hot 100	9
"Hot Rod Lincoln"	Hot Country Songs	51
"Hot Rod Lincoln"	Canada (RPM)	7
"Beat Me Daddy, Eight to the Bar"	Billboard Hot 100	81
"Beat Me Daddy, Eight to the Bar"	Canada RPM	82

=== Year-end charts ===
Title	Chart (1972)	Position
"Hot Rod Lincoln"	Billboard Hot 100	69
