= Tales from the Ozone =

Studio album by Commander Cody and His Lost Planet Airmen
- Released: 1975
- Length: 35:52
- Label: Warner Bros. Records
- Producer: Hoyt Axton

Commander Cody and His Lost Planet Airmen chronology
Commander Cody and His Lost Planet Airmen (1975)	Tales from the Ozone (1975)	We've Got a Live One Here! (1976)

Tales from the Ozone is an album by American band Commander Cody and His Lost Planet Airmen. Their sixth album, it was produced by the musician Hoyt Axton, and recorded at the Record Plant in Sausalito, California. The last studio album to feature most of the band's original lineup, it was released in 1975. It reached #168 on the Billboard 200.

== Critical reception ==
Professional ratings
Review scores
Source	Rating
AllMusic	4.5/5 stars
The Encyclopedia of Popular Music	2/5 stars
The Rolling Stone Album Guide	1/5 stars

On AllMusic, Thom Jurek said, "Like their eponymously titled set earlier in 1975, Tales from the Ozone featured a plethora of great songs... Critics have been critical of the production on this set in the past, but Axton knew exactly what he was doing in the studio. The "flat" sound is the dynamic the band had live, with everything up in the mix."

On Country Standard Time, Eli Messinger wrote, "Commander Cody and His Lost Planet Airmen's Tales from the Ozone draws almost entirely from a list of covers... As a mature band, recording for the then-reigning industry conglomerate, this is more polished than the earlier albums and just as inventive and enjoyable."

When the album was released, Cash Box magazine wrote, "Commander Cody's music, in its own slightly erratic way, represents the true spirit of America. Through the lines of Tales from the Ozone run images of truck stops and bars in one horse towns."

== Track listing ==
Side A

1. "Minnie the Moocher" (Cab Calloway) – 3:50
2. "It's Gonna Be One of Those Nights" (George Frayne, Bill Kirchen, Billy C. Farlow) – 2:17
3. "Connie" (Kevin "Blackie" Farrell) – 2:52
4. "I Been to Georgia on a Fast Train" (Billy Joe Shaver) – 2:47
5. "Honky Tonk Music" (George Hawke) – 3:39
6. "Lightnin' Bar Blues" (Hoyt Axton) – 2:35

Side B

1. "Paid in Advance" (Axton) – 2:50
2. "Cajun Baby" (Hank Williams Jr., Hank Williams) – 2:41
3. "Tina Louise" (Farrell) – 3:27
4. "The Shadow Knows" (Jerry Leiber, Mike Stoller) – 2:30
5. "Roll Your Own" (Mel McDaniel) – 3:22
6. "Gypsy Fiddle" (Andy Stein) – 3:02

== Personnel ==
Commander Cody and His Lost Planet Airmen

- Commander Cody (George Frayne) – piano, vocals
- Billy C. Farlow – vocals, harmonica
- Bill Kirchen – guitar, vocals
- John Tichy – guitar, vocals
- Bobby Black – pedal steel guitar, vocals
- Andy Stein – fiddle, saxophone
- Bruce Barlow – bass guitar, vocals
- Lance Dickerson – drums, percussion, marimba, vocals

Additional musicians

- Tower of Power Horns with Mic Gillette and Gregg Adams playing trumpet
- David Bromberg – dobro
- Hoyt Axton – dobro, background vocals
- Renee Armand, Ronee Blakley, Nicolette Larson, Mimi Fariña, Deborah Anderson, Kevin "Blackie" Farrell, Marc Edelstein – background vocals

Production

- Produced by Hoyt Axton
- Mixing, engineering: John Stronach
- Additional engineering: Tom Anderson, Chris Morris, Deni King
- Mastering: Kent Dunken, John Stronach
- Art direction, graphics, photography: Ren Deaton Productions
