= Don't Let Go =

Don't Let Go may refer to:

== Film ==
- Don't Let Go (2002 film), an American independent feature film
- Don't Let Go (2019 film), an American supernatural thriller film

== Literature ==
- Don't Let Go (French: Ne lâche pas ma main), a 2013 novel by Michel Bussi
- Don't Let Go, a 2017 novel by Harlan Coben

== Music ==
- Don't Let Go (Ben Sidran album), 1974
- Don't Let Go (Jerry Garcia Band album), 2001
- Don't Let Go (Isaac Hayes album), 1979, or the title song
- Don't Let Go (George Duke album), 1978
- "Don't Let Go (Love)", a 1996 song by En Vogue
- "Don't Let Go" (David Sneddon song), 2003
- "Don't Let Go" (Jesse Stone song), 1958
- "Don't Let Go" (The Rasmus song)
- "Don't Let Go" (Wang Chung song), 1984
- "Don't Let Go", a song by Bryan Adams and Sarah McLachlan from the soundtrack for the film Spirit: Stallion of the Cimarron
- "Don't Let Go", a song by David Archuleta from David Archuleta
- "Don't Let Go", a song by Deep Purple from Rapture of the Deep
- "Don't Let Go", a song by the Lightning Seeds from Cloudcuckooland
- "Don't Let Go", a song by Loverboy from Wildside
- "Don't Let Go", a song by Weezer from The Green Album
- "Don't Let Go", a song by Yo Majesty from Futuristically Speaking...Never Be Afraid
- "Don't Let Go", a song by R. Kelly from the soundtrack for the film Daddy's Little Girls
