= It Should've Been Me (album) =

Studio album by Zoot Money's Big Roll Band
- Released: 1965
- Label: Columbia 33SX 1734

Zoot Money's Big Roll Band chronology
It Should've Been Me (1965)	Zoot! (1966)

Professional ratings
Review scores
Source	Rating
Record Mirror	4/5 stars

It Should've Been Me is the debut album of Zoot Money's Big Roll Band, released in 1965. The album's liner notes were by Alexis Korner.

== Track listing ==
Side 1

1. "I'll Go Crazy" (James Brown)
2. "Jump Back" (Rufus Thomas)
3. "Along Came John" (John Patton)
4. "Back Door Blues" (Robert Brown)
5. "It Should've Been Me" (Memphis Curtis)
6. "Sweet Little Rock and Roller" (Chuck Berry)

Side 2

1. "My Wife Can't Cook" (Gerald L. Russ)
2. "Rags and Old Iron" (Norman Curtis, Oscar Brown Jr.)
3. "The Cat" (Lalo Schifrin)
4. "Feelin' Sad" (Eddie "Guitar Slim" Jones)
5. "Bright Lights, Big City" (Jimmy Reed)
6. "Fina" (Stuart)

== Personnel ==
- Zoot Money – vocals, organ
- Paul Williams bass – vocals on "Jump Back" and "Rags and Old Iron"
- Andy Summers – guitar
- Colin Allen – drums
- Nick Newall – tenor saxophone
- Clive Burroughs – baritone saxophone
