= Dopers, Drunks and Everyday Losers =

Studio album by Commander Cody
- Released: April 21, 2009
- Length: 45:47
- Label: Blind Pig Records
- Producers: Aaron Louie Hurwitz; Commander Cody

Commander Cody chronology
| All the Way Live from Turkey Trot (2005) | Dopers, Drunks and Everyday Losers (2009) | Live from the Island (2013) |

Dopers, Drunks and Everyday Losers is an album by Commander Cody. It was released in 2009.

George Frayne – stage name Commander Cody – was the frontman for the band Commander Cody and His Lost Planet Airmen from 1967 to 1976. After that he recorded and performed as a solo artist, continuing to combine music genres such as rock, country, Western swing, and boogie-woogie. Dopers, Drunks, and Everyday Losers was his first studio album since Worst Case Scenario in 1994.

The album cover artwork for Dopers, Drunks and Everyday Losers was created by Frayne, who was also a visual artist.

== Critical reception ==
In No Depression Rod Ames wrote, "It's an enormous amount of entertainment from start to finish. In fact, I don’t think I've had this much fun listening to Commander Cody since his Country Casanova record 35 years ago. There's a lot of bang for your buck too. The CD contains 14 tunes.... This latest record from Commander Cody is an extremely pleasurable romp down a very surreal memory lane."

On AllMusic Thom Jurek said, "This set, Dopers, Drunks and Everyday Losers, issued by Blind Pig, fares a bit better than most of its predecessors, but not for the reasons one might expect. For starters, there are a slew of Lost Planet Airmen covers here – and if anyone has the right to do them, it's the Commander..."

In Twangville Shawn Underwood wrote, "In the spirit of his earlier incarnations (Commander Cody and His Lost Planet Airmen) and brothers in arms like Asleep at the Wheel and Austin Lounge Lizards, this is a disc that's the perfect accompaniment to Friday night.... So if your music collection is in need of some party music that's slightly off the beaten track, Dopers, Drunks and Everyday Losers will be a good addition."

== Track listing ==
1. "Roll Yer Own" (Mel McDaniel) – 3:53
2. "Tennessee Plates" (John Hiatt, Michael Porter) – 3:31
3. "Wine Do Yer Stuff" (William Farlow, George Frayne) – 2:47
4. "Lone Ranger" (Frayne) – 3:30
5. "Semi Truck" (Farlow, William Kirchen) – 2:20
6. "Down and Out" (traditional) – 3:35
7. "Seven Eleven" (Frayne) – 3:33
8. "Seeds and Stems Again" (Farlow, Frayne) – 4:40
9. "It's Gonna Be One of Those Nights" (Frayne, Farlow, Kirchen) – 3:40
10. "OK Hotel" (Frayne) – 3:07
11. "They Kicked Me Out of the Band" (Brien Hopkins) – 3:14
12. "Losers' Avenue" (Sue Casanova, Frayne, Marie Spinosa, Aaron Hurwitz) – 2:29
13. "Last Call for Alcohol" (traditional) – 2:55
14. "No No Song" (Hoyt Axton, David Jackson) – 3:02

== Personnel ==
Musicians

- Commander Cody – piano, lead vocals
- Steve Barbuto – drums, percussion, lead vocals on "Wine Do Yer Stuff"
- Mark Emerick – guitar, lead vocals on "Semi Truck"
- Randy Bramwell – bass, background vocals
- Chris "Tiny" Olsen – pedal steel guitar
- Professor Louie – organ, accordion, background vocals
- Circe Link – lead vocals on "Seeds and Stems Again"
- Miss Marie Spinosa – tambourine, percussion, background vocals

Production

- Produced by Aaron Louie Hurwitz and Commander Cody
- Executive producers: Edward Chmelewski, Jerry Del Guidice
- Engineering, mixing: Aaron Louie Hurwitz
- Mastering: Blaise Barton
- Artwork: George Frayne
- Design: Al Brandtner
