= Two Triple Cheese =

1980 song by Commander Cody

Single by Commander Cody

from the album Lose it Tonight
- B-side: "Roll the Dice"
- Released: May 1980
- Genre: Country rock; rock and roll; hard rock
- Length: 2:26
- Label: Peter Pan Records
- Songwriter(s): George Frayne
- Producer(s): George Frayne

Commander Cody singles chronology
"Sea Wolf" (1980)	"Two Triple Cheese" (1980)	"Lose it Tonight" (1981)

"Two Triple Cheese" (alternatively titled "Two Triple Cheese (Side Order of Fries)") is a 1980 song by American band Commander Cody, from their album Lose It Tonight. It was also released as a 7-inch single, with a B-side of "Rockette 88".

The music video for the song, directed by Joe Dea, is included in the music video collection of the Museum of Modern Art and has appeared on MTV. Joe Dea also won an Emmy Award for directing the music video. The song was also mentioned in the book Big Man by Clarence Clemons.
