= Peck Kelley =

American jazz pianist (1898–1980)

- Birth name: John Dickson Kelley
- Born: October 22, 1898 Houston, Texas, United States
- Died: December 26, 1980 (aged 82) Houston, Texas, United States
- Genres: Jazz
- Occupation(s): Musician; Bandleader
- Instrument: Piano
- Labels: Arcadia Records
- Formerly of: Jack Teagarden; Louis Prima; Pee Wee Russell

John Dickson "Peck" Kelley (October 22, 1898 – December 26, 1980) was an American jazz pianist. He was best known for his 1920s band Peck's Bad Boys, which included Jack Teagarden, and Pee Wee Russell.

== Early life ==
John Dickson "Peck" Kelley was born in Houston, Texas on October 22, 1898.

== Career ==
=== Peck's Bad Boys ===
During the 1920s, Kelley was a popular bandleader who led his own band, Peck's Bad Boys. The group included several jazz musicians that would go on to forge successful recording careers of their own, players such as Jack Teagarden, Louis Prima, Terry Shand, Wingy Manone, Leon Roppolo and Pee Wee Russell. Despite the apparent success of this group, no recordings survive from this period.

=== Reluctance to travel or record ===
Kelley rarely played anywhere outside of Texas. Early in his career he did perform in Missouri and Louisiana, but the politics of the worker's union at the time combined with the overall hassle of obtaining permits prompted him to return to Texas. Throughout his career Kelley repeatedly turned down offers by other musicians of the day to play outside of Texas - offers from artists such as Bing Crosby, Jimmy Dorsey, Tommy Dorsey and Paul Whiteman. However, he did perform in St. Louis, Missouri (1925), Shreveport, Louisiana (1927) and New Orleans, Louisiana (1934). Kelley joined the Dick Shannon quartet with Glen Boyd on Bass Fiddle in 1957, from which the only studio recordings from this musician survive. These were made in Houston in June 1957. Although Kelley enjoyed playing at the sessions, and subsequently listening to the tapes, he refused to allow them to be released. They were eventually released in 1983 (after Kelley's death) by Commodore Records as the "Peck Kelley Jam Sessions, Volumes 1 & 2". However, some private recordings of this same period have been released on the Arkadia record label.

== Personal life ==
Throughout his career Kelley wished to remain anonymous, a private man who did not wish fame for himself. It is commonly accepted by jazz historians that the 1940s Will Bradley hit "Beat Me Daddy, Eight to the Bar" is in reference and tribute to Kelley. Eventually Peck became blind and developed Parkinson's disease, dying on December 26, 1980, at 82.

== Discography ==
Year	Album	Leader	Label
1950s	"Peck Kelley"	Peck Kelley	Arkadia Records
1950s	"Out of Obscurity"	Peck Kelley	Arkadia Records
1957	"Peck Kelley Jam Volumes 1 & 2"	Dick Shannon	Commodore Records
