= Diggy Liggy Lo =

Single by Doug Kershaw

from the album The Cajun Way
- B-side: "Papa and Mama Had Love"
- Released: August 1969
- Genre: Country
- Length: 2:24
- Label: Warner Bros.
- Songwriter: Terry J. Clement
- Producer: Buddy Killen

Doug Kershaw singles chronology
"Feed It to the Fish" (1969)	"Diggy Liggy Lo" (1969)	"Orange Blossom Special" (1970)

"Diggy Liggy Lo" is a single by American country music duo Rusty & Doug. The song was written and originally performed by Terry J. Clement. Released in 1961, their version peaked at number 14 on the Billboard Hot Country Singles chart. Doug Kershaw, one half of the duo, released a solo version of the song in 1969, that peaked at number 70 on the Billboard Hot Country Singles chart. It also reached number 1 on the RPM Country Tracks chart in Canada.

== Chart performance ==
=== Rusty & Doug ===
Chart (1961)	Peak position
U.S. Billboard Hot Country Singles	14

=== Doug Kershaw ===
Chart (1969)	Peak position
U.S. Billboard Hot Country Singles	70
Canadian RPM Country Tracks	1

== Cover versions ==
- Buck Owens, On the Bandstand (1963)
- Nitty Gritty Dirt Band, All the Good Times (1972)
- Commander Cody and His Lost Planet Airmen, Hot Licks, Cold Steel & Truckers Favorites (1972)
- Teddy Nelson on his debut album, Diggy Liggy, in 1976, and again as a duet with Skeeter Davis in 1991 for the album You Were Made for Me.
- Kikki Danielsson, Kikki (1982)
- Mark O'Connor, Heroes (1993)
- Santiano (2012)
- Plava Trava Zaborava, a country group from Croatia.
- Cumulus, a Finnish version.
- Heidi Hauge a Norwegian singer, on her album Country Dance.
- The Flying Burrito Brothers on their The Red Album.
