= Hammer of the Honky Tonk Gods =

Hammer of the Honky-Tonk Gods

Studio album by Bill Kirchen
- Released: January 2007
- Studio: Specific Sound
- Genre: Country
- Label: Proper American
- Producer: Paul Riley

Bill Kirchen chronology
Dieselbilly Road Trip (2002)	Hammer of the Honky-Tonk Gods (2007)	Word to the Wise (2010)

Hammer of the Honky-Tonk Gods is the seventh album by Bill Kirchen. Bill explores where country music finds its origins in blues and bluegrass, and in the Western Swing of Texas and California honky tonks.

He is joined by Nick Lowe, Austin de Lone and The Impossible Birds (Geraint Watkins, Robert Treherne), and their influence is very much in evidence. The title track is a loving tribute to the Fender Telecaster guitar, Kirchen's guitar of choice.

== Track listing ==
All tracks composed by Bill Kirchen; except where noted.

1. "Hammer of the Honky-Tonk Gods"
2. "Rocks Into Sand"
3. "Get a Little Goner" (Bill Kirchen, Louise Kirchen, Sarah Brown)
4. "Skid Row in My Mind" (Kevin "Blackie" Farrell)
5. "Working Man"
6. "Soul Crusin'" (Joe New)
7. "Truth Be Told" (Sarah Brown)
8. "Devil With the Blue Dress On" (Frederick "Shorty" Long, William Stevenson)
9. "One More Day"
10. "Heart of Gold" (T. Johnson)
11. "If It's Really Got to Be This Way" (Arthur Alexander, Donnie Fritts, Gary Nicholson)

== Personnel ==
- Bill Kirchen - guitar, vocals
- Nick Lowe - bass, backing vocals
- Cindy Cashdollar, Dave Berzansky - steel guitar
- Danny Levin - fiddle
- Austin de Lone, Geraint Watkins - keyboards, backing vocals
- Robert Treherne - drums
- Bucky Lindsey, Chris Gaffney, Dave Gonzalez, Lisa Best and the Git Gals - additional vocals

== Trivia ==
In his live show, Kirchen has referred to track 11 (If It's Really Got To Be This Way) as a "secret bonus track" that is fully listed on the CD, and only the audience of his live show knows the "secret" that it's actually a bonus track, not a regular track.
