= Hot Rod Lincoln =

1955 single by Charlie Ryan

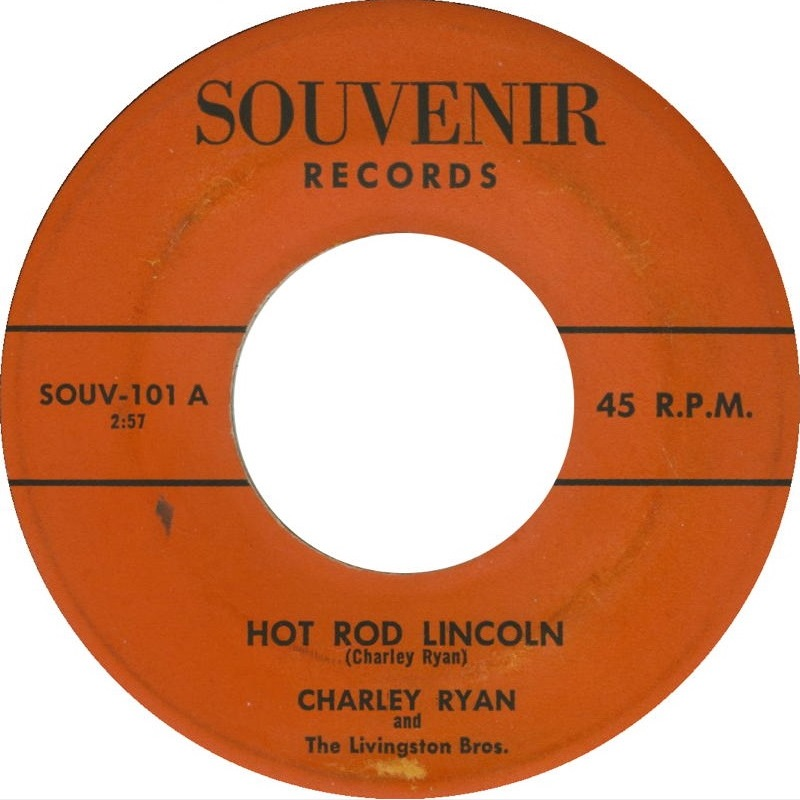
- Label of the original 1955 single

Single by Charlie Ryan and the Livingston Bros.
- B-side: "Hank Williams Goodbye"
- Released: 1955
- Genre: Rock and roll, rockabilly
- Length: 2:57
- Label: Souvenir (SOUV-101)
- Songwriter: Charlie Ryan

"Hot Rod Lincoln" is a song by American singer-songwriter Charlie Ryan, first released in 1955. It was written as an answer song to Arkie Shibley's 1950 hit "Hot Rod Race" (US No. 29).

It describes a drive north on US Route 99 (predecessor to Interstate 5) from San Pedro, Los Angeles, and over "Grapevine Hill" which soon becomes a hot rod race that ends with serious consequences.

== Song details ==
The car race is described between two hot rod cars, the narrator's Ford Model A (with a Lincoln motor) and a Cadillac. The song says the Ford's "got 12 cylinders", overdrive, a four-barrel carburetor, 4.11:1 final drive ratio, and safety tubes. The narrator ends up being arrested by the police for his high-speed driving, and is thrown into jail, where the narrator calls his father to bail him out, and describes the exasperation of his father: "He said, 'Son, you're gonna drive me to drinkin' / If you don't quit (or "Stop") drivin' that hot rod Lincoln!'"

Ryan's original rockabilly version of the song was released in 1955 through Souvenir Records under the artist name Charley Ryan and the Livingston Bros. A second version was released in 1959 through 4 Star Records, credited to Charlie Ryan and the Timberline Riders. Ryan based the description of the eponymous car on his own hot rod, built from a 1948 12-cylinder Lincoln chassis shortened two feet, with a 1930 Ford Model A body fitted to it. Ryan raced his hot rod against a Cadillac sedan driven by a friend in Lewiston, Idaho, driving up the Spiral Highway (former U.S. Route 95 in Idaho) to the top of Lewiston Hill. Some say he incorporated elements from this race in his lyrics to "Hot Rod Lincoln", but changed the setting to Grapevine Hill (a long, nearly straight grade up to Tejon Pass, near the town of Gorman, California) to fit it within the narrative of "Hot Rod Race".

== Johnny Bond version ==
Another version of "Hot Rod Lincoln" was recorded by country musician Johnny Bond and released in 1960 through Republic Records, with Bond's lyrics changing the hot rod's engine from a V12 to a V8, among other changes. It reached No. 26 on the Billboard Hot 100 in August 1960. Bond released a sequel in the same year called "X-15", set in 1997, about an air race in an X-15 plane.

== Commander Cody version ==
"Hot Rod Lincoln"

Single by Commander Cody and His Lost Planet Airmen

from the album Lost in the Ozone
- B-side: "My Home in My Hand"
- Released: March 1972
- Genre: Rockabilly, rock and roll
- Length: 2:40
- Label: Paramount
- Songwriter: Charlie Ryan

Commander Cody and His Lost Planet Airmen singles chronology
"Lost in the Ozone" (1971)	"Hot Rod Lincoln" (1972)	"Beat Me Daddy, Eight to the Bar" (1972)

A 1971 version, by country rock band Commander Cody and His Lost Planet Airmen on their album Lost in the Ozone, became the most successful version of "Hot Rod Lincoln", reaching No. 9 on the Billboard Hot 100, No. 28 Adult Contemporary, No. 7 in Canada, and was ranked No. 69 on the U.S. Billboard Year-End Hot 100 singles of 1972. The song peaked at No. 45 in Australia. This version maintained most of the lyrical changes from Johnny Bond's version but changed them further while maintaining the original story.

== Chart history ==
=== Weekly charts ===
Charlie Ryan

Chart (1960)	Peak position
U.S. Billboard Hot 100	33
U.S. Billboard Country	14

Johnny Bond

Chart (1960)	Peak position
U.S. Billboard Hot 100	26
U.S. Cash Box Top 100	25

Commander Cody

Chart (1972)	Peak position
Australia (Kent Music Report)	45
Canada RPM Top Singles	7
New Zealand (Listener)	15
U.S. Billboard Hot 100	9
U.S. Billboard Easy Listening	28
U.S. Billboard Country	51
U.S. Cash Box Top 100	7

=== Year-end charts ===
Chart (1972)	Rank
Canada	34
U.S. Billboard Hot 100	69

== Other versions ==
In addition to Johnny Bond and Commander Cody and His Lost Planet Airmen, many other artists have recorded "Hot Rod Lincoln" in the decades since its original release, including:

- Asleep at the Wheel, on Western Standard Time (1988); this version reached No. 65 on Billboard's Hot Country Songs
- All, on Allroy's Revenge (1989)
- Jim Varney, on The Beverly Hillbillies soundtrack (1993)
- Roger Miller, on A Man Like Me: The Early Years of Roger Miller (2006)
