= Geoffrey Stokes =

American journalist and author

Geoffrey Stokes (May 3, 1940 – September 12, 1995) was an American journalist and author.

Stokes is best known for Star-Making Machinery: The Odyssey of an Album, his 1976 book about the creation of a Commander Cody and His Lost Planet Airmen album. The book received strong reviews. The Los Angeles Times considered it "the best piece of reportage on how the music biz processes its wayward art." Robert Christgau called it "one of the best rock books ever written and the definitive account of how the music biz operates." Kirkus Reviews wrote that it was a "deflating chronicle of 'the interplay between giant corporations' at the expense of the musicians and the music—once thought to be the harbinger of radical consciousness."

Pinstripe Pandemonium: A Season with the New York Yankees, an overview of the New York Yankees' 1983 season, was favorably reviewed by The New York Times. The paper preferred it to Balls, Graig Nettles and Peter Golenbock's book about the same season.

Stokes worked at The Village Voice for many years, writing the "Press Clips" column and using the pseudonym Vladimir Estragon for his food column. He also contributed to The Boston Globe and the Valley News.

In 1995, Stokes died of esophageal cancer at the age of 55.

== Books ==
- Star-Making Machinery: The Odyssey of an Album (1976)
- Waiting for Dessert (1982)
- The Village Voice Anthology (1956–1980) (1982)
- Pinstripe Pandemonium: A Season with the New York Yankees (1984)
- The Beatles. Times Books. 1987. ISBN 978-0812909289.
