= Heidi Hauge =

- Born: Heidi Hauge; 14 October 1967 (age 58); Skien, Norway
- Genres: Country, Folk
- Occupation: Musician
- Years active: 1990–present
- Labels: Showtime Records; Harlekin Records; Rocade Records

Heidi Hauge (born 14 October 1967) is a Norwegian singer of folk and country music.

She began her career as a schlager singer. In 1999 she was discovered by a manager of the Norwegian label Showtime Records and signed her first recording contract. The following year she released a debut album, Country Time.

In 2001 her third album, Country Girl, reached 15th place in the Norwegian album charts. Her best standing was 7th place in 2004 with the same album. Six of her albums also entered the Danish charts, four of them in the top ten.

By the end of 2002, after four albums, Hauge had sold 170,000 records in Norway and 25,000 in Denmark, where she had appeared in a TV 2 program to promote her music.

The majority of her songs are covers of country music classics, most of them sung in English but also in the Norwegian language.

== Discography ==
=== Albums ===
- 2000 – Country Time
- 2001 – Country Rose
- 2001 – Country Girl
- 2002 – Country Blue
- 2002 – Country Dance
- 2003 – Country perler
- 2003 – Country jul (with Liv Marit Wedvik and Jenny Jenssen)
- 2004 – Country Jewels
- 2005 – Country Gold
- 2005 – Movin' On
- 2007 – Some Broken Hearts...
- 2007 – Julekveld på landet
- 2016 – Acoustic Country Duets (with Arne Benoni)
- 2019 – Best of Heidi Hauge

=== Singles ===
- 2000 – "Seven Spanish Angels"
- 2007 – "Saturday Night"
- 2014 – "I Can't Be Bothered Now" (with Arne Benoni)
