= Beat Me Daddy, Eight to the Bar =

- Sheet music cover

Single by Will Bradley and His Orchestra featuring Ray McKinley
- B-side: "Beat Me Daddy, Eight to the Bar Pt. 2"
- Published: 1940 by Leeds Music
- Released: 1940
- Recorded: May 21, 1940
- Genre: Boogie woogie
- Length: 2:39
- Label: Columbia (no. 35530)
- Songwriters: Don Raye; Hughie Prince; Ray McKinley under his wife's name Eleanore Sheehy

"Beat Me Daddy, Eight to the Bar" is a song written in 1940 by Don Raye, Hughie Prince, and Ray McKinley. It follows the American boogie-woogie tradition of syncopated piano music. In some versions the title is punctuated "Beat Me Daddy (Eight to the Bar)" or "Beat Me Daddy, Eight to the Bar," or written "Beat Me, Daddy, Eight to a Bar."

== Background ==
The title adopts 1940s' hipster slang coined by Raye's friend, Ray McKinley, a drummer and lead singer in the Jimmy Dorsey band in the 1930s. McKinley kicked off certain uptempo songs by asking pianist Freddie Slack (nicknamed "Daddy") to give him a boogie beat, or "eight to the bar" (i.e. 8/8 time). McKinley, in a discussion with the jazz writer George Simon relates, "We were playing one of them (a boogie, blues) one night at the Famous Door and two songwriters, Don Raye and Hughie Prince, were there. There was one part where I had a drum break, and for some reason or other that night, instead of playing the break, I sang out, "Oh, Beat Me, Daddy, Eight to the Bar." After the set, Hughie called me over to the table and asked if they could write a song using that break. I told him to go ahead and they offered to cut me in on the tune. That was fine with me." For that reason Raye gave a partial songwriting credit to McKinley. The song was formally published under McKinley's wife's name, Eleanore Sheehy, because McKinley was under a songwriting contract with another publisher. The nickname "Daddy Slack" was also used in the 1941 recording by "Pig Foot Pete" with Don Raye singing in Slack's band. It is commonly accepted by jazz historians that this song is in reference and tribute to Peck Kelley, a 1920s jazz pianist. However McKinley, talking to George Simon says, "A lot of people seem to think I was referring to Peck Kelley, and some years later Peck even thanked me for it. But, you know, I didn't have anybody - Peck or anybody else - in mind, just an imaginary piano player in an imaginary town."

The song was first recorded in 1940 by the Will Bradley orchestra, featuring drummer McKinley on vocals and Freddie Slack on piano.

== Charts ==
The single placed in Billboard's "Leading Music Box Records of 1941" at number ten.

== Recordings ==
- Will Bradley and His Orchestra in 1940 on Columbia Records, set C-123.
- Andrews Sisters, first in 1940; their 1941 hit, "Boogie Woogie Bugle Boy", which praises a fictional trumpet player, resembles this hit. Both songs were written by Don Raye and Hughie Prince.
- Glenn Miller and His Orchestra in 1940 on RCA Victor Bluebird.
- Woody Herman in 1940 on Decca.
- Ella Fitzgerald recorded this song with arrangements by Russell Garcia on her Verve release Get Happy! (1959).
- Commander Cody and his Lost Planet Airmen on their album Lost in the Ozone (1971). (#82 Canada)
