= Don't Let Go (Isaac Hayes album) =

Studio album by Isaac Hayes
- Released: 1979
- Recorded: 1979
- Genre: Soul, disco
- Length: 38:09
- Label: Polydor
- Producer: Isaac Hayes

Isaac Hayes chronology
HotBed (1978)	Don't Let Go (1979)	And Once Again (1980)

Professional ratings
Review scores
Source	Rating
AllMusic	3/5 stars

Don't Let Go is the fourteenth studio album by American soul musician Isaac Hayes. The album was released in 1979, by Polydor Records. The album debuted at number 39 on the Billboard 200.

== Track listing ==
All tracks composed by Isaac Hayes; except where indicated

No.	Title	Writer(s)	Length
1.	"Don't Let Go"	Jesse Stone	7:16
2.	"What Does It Take"		6:00
3.	"A Few More Kisses to Go"		6:08
4.	"Fever"	Eddie Cooley, John Davenport	8:19
5.	"Someone Who Will Take the Place of You"		10:26
Total length:			38:09

== Charts ==
=== Weekly charts ===
Chart (1979–1980)	Peak position
Australian Albums (Kent Music Report)	41
US Billboard 200	39
US Top R&B/Hip-Hop Albums (Billboard)	9

=== Year-end charts ===
Chart (1980)	Position
US Billboard 200	70
US Top R&B/Hip-Hop Albums (Billboard)	24
