= Long Distance Call (song) =

Classic modern blues song

Long Distance Call

"Long Distance Call" is a song by American blues musician Muddy Waters. It was first released as a single in 1951 by Chess Records (1452), with "Too Young To Know" on the B-side. The single reached No. 8 on the US R&B chart. It was later released on the greatest hits album The Best of Muddy Waters (1958), and is hailed as a classic modern blues song; Waters's singing is cited as an excellent example of blue notes.

== Background and content ==
"Long Distance Call" originated in the song "Long Distance Moan", recorded in September 1929 by Blind Lemon Jefferson (Paramount 12852). In the late 1940s and early 1950s, Muddy Waters was recording the type of music that helped the blues survive as a commercially viable type of music. "Long Distance Call" was recorded on 23 January 1951, with Little Walter on harmonica and Ernest "Big" Crawford on bass, in a session that also produced "Too Young To Know", "Honey Bee", and "Howlin' Wolf".

The lyrics feature a male first-person speaker addressing his female lover, asking her to say something kind to him. When a call comes, long-distance, it is only to tell him that "another mule [is] kickin' in your stall". John Collis calls the song a "slow, meditative and soulful strut" that has Waters (a Mississippi native then working in Chicago) "exploit migration as a commercial theme".

== Reception and analysis ==
English trumpeter and broadcaster Humphrey Lyttelton reviewed the song (and "Hello Little Girl") in 1955 in New Musical Express, saying Waters is "a genuine contemporary blues singer". In a 1969 interview, Muddy Waters himself said it was his favorite song out of all the songs he had recorded. Luther "Georgia Boy" Johnson, a member of Waters's band in the 1960s, co-opted the song as his own, "complete with Muddy's gospel preaching at the song's climax".

David Dicaire, in Blues Singers: Biographies of 50 Legendary Artists of the Early 20th Century, calls the song "a definitive modern blues classic". David Hatch and Stephen Millward, in an analysis of blue notes, single out the song because, in their opinion, it displays Muddy Waters's mastery of blues singing, particularly his "sliding effortlessly between the major and the 'blue' tones, with just the right mixture of hope and bitterness in his voice".
