= Paramount Records (1969) =

American record label (1969–74)

- Parent company: Famous Music (1969–1974)
- Founded: July 10, 1969; 57 years ago
- Founder: Paramount Pictures
- Status: Defunct, sold to ABC Records in 1974, catalog now owned by Universal Music Group
- Distributor: Self-distributed
- Genre: Pop music Movie soundtracks
- Country of origin: United States

Paramount Records was an American record label started in 1969 by Paramount Pictures (then a unit of Gulf+Western) after acquiring the rights to the name from George H. Buck. A previous Paramount Records, active between 1917 and 1932, had been unconnected to Paramount Pictures. The new Paramount label reissued pop releases by sister label Dot Records, which had recently become a country label and, in the process, had its entire pop back catalog deleted completely. It also released new albums from other pop musicians and soundtracks of Paramount films such as Paint Your Wagon, among others. Cast members of the Paramount Television series The Brady Bunch were signed, and the label issued several tie-in albums and singles.

After Gulf+Western sold its record label holdings to ABC (which happened to have aired the Brady Bunch TV series) in 1974, the Paramount label was discontinued in favor of ABC Records, which itself was sold to MCA Records in 1979. MCA itself had previously purchased Paramount's pre-1950 sound film library in 1958, currently managed by Universal Television subsidiary EMKA, Ltd. The Paramount catalog is now owned by Universal Music Group and managed by Geffen Records (whose founder, David Geffen, later became a co-founder of DreamWorks, which was a sister studio of Paramount from 2006 to 2008, and whose own record catalog is now owned by Universal).

On a side note, MCA continued to release soundtracks to some later Paramount films into the 1990s. Sliding Doors (1998) was the last Paramount release to have its soundtrack issued by MCA.

In 2015, Paramount Pictures revived the label as Paramount Music - a record label specializing in soundtracks from Paramount movies, with distribution by TuneCore.

== Selected releases ==
Artist	Album	Details
Kay Starr and Count Basie	How About This	Released: 1969
Lalo Schifrin	Mannix (Themes from the Original Score of the Paramount Television Show)	Released: 1969
Lalo Schifrin	More Mission: Impossible	Released: 1969
Bola Sete	Workin' on a Groovy Thing	Released: 1970
The Brady Bunch	Merry Christmas from the Brady Bunch	Released: November 2, 1970
Elton John	"Friends" Original Soundtrack Recording	Released: March 5, 1971
Karen Dalton	In My Own Time	Released: May, 1971
Ralph McTell	You Well-Meaning Brought Me Here	Released: October, 1971
Commander Cody and His Lost Planet Airmen	Lost in the Ozone	Released: November, 1971
Nino Rota	The Godfather	Released: November, 1971
The Brady Bunch	Meet the Brady Bunch	Released: April 17, 1972
Commander Cody and His Lost Planet Airmen	Hot Licks, Cold Steel & Truckers Favorites	Released: May 1972
The Brady Bunch	The Kids from the Brady Bunch	Released: December 4, 1972
Commander Cody and His Lost Planet Airmen	Country Casanova	Released: May, 1973
The Brady Bunch	The Brady Bunch Phonographic Album	Released: June 18, 1973
Commander Cody and His Lost Planet Airmen	Live from Deep in the Heart of Texas	Released: March 1974

== See also ==
- List of record labels
- CBS Records (2006)
- Comedy Central Records
- DreamWorks Records
- Famous Music
- Nickelodeon Records
- Paramount Music
