= Jesse Stone (musician) =

American rhythm and blues musician and songwriter

Background information
- Also known as: Charles Calhoun
- Born: Jesse Albert Stone; November 16, 1901; Atchison, Kansas, U.S.
- Died: April 1, 1999 (aged 97) Altamonte Springs, Florida, U.S.
- Genres: R&B; jazz; rock and roll; pop
- Occupations: Musician; songwriter; arranger; record producer
- Instrument: Piano
- Years active: 1920s–1966
- Label: Atlantic

Jesse Albert Stone (November 16, 1901 – April 1, 1999) was an American rhythm and blues musician and songwriter whose influence spanned a wide range of genres. He also used the pseudonyms Charles Calhoun and Chuck Calhoun. His best-known composition as Calhoun was "Shake, Rattle and Roll".

Ahmet Ertegun once stated that "Jesse Stone did more to develop the basic rock 'n' roll sound than anybody else."

== Early life ==
Stone was born in Atchison, Kansas, and raised in Kansas. His grandparents were formerly enslaved in Tennessee.

Stone was influenced by a wide array of styles. He came from a musical family who put on minstrel shows, and performed with them by the age of five. He was part of a trained dog act at the age of four.

== Career ==
By 1926, Stone had formed a group, the Blue Serenaders, and cut his first record, "Starvation Blues", for Okeh Records in 1927. For the next few years he worked as a pianist and arranger in Kansas City, recording with Julia Lee among others, and then in the 1930s organised a larger orchestra.

=== New York in the 1930s and 1940s ===
Duke Ellington got Stone's orchestra booked at the Cotton Club in 1936, and Ellington put Stone up free of charge in his apartment for four months. Over the next few years Stone worked as a bandleader at the Apollo Theatre, and more widely in Harlem as a songwriter and arranger, with Chick Webb's band (which included Louis Jordan), Jimmie Lunceford, and many others. He made some recordings under his own name in the 1930s and 1940s.

In 1941, Stone became musical director for the all-female jazz band, the International Sweethearts of Rhythm. He left after two years. Stone was interviewed in the 1986 documentary film International Sweethearts of Rhythm about his time with that band.

Stone's early writings show a deep blues influence. An early success was "Idaho", recorded by several artists, with the Benny Goodman version peaking at number 4 (pop) in 1942. The recording by Guy Lombardo sold three million copies. Jimmy Dorsey recorded his composition "Sorghum Switch", later retitled "Cole Slaw" by Louis Jordan. Stone also recorded novelty blues records for RCA Records, and wrote the standard "Smack Dab in the Middle".

=== Atlantic Records ===
In 1945, with his friend Herb Abramson, he went to work for Al Green at National Records, and two years later the pair joined the staff at Atlantic Records. At the time, Stone was the only black person on the Atlantic payroll.

Stone worked for Atlantic as a producer, songwriter, and arranger. During a trip to the South in 1949 with Ahmet Ertegun and Herb Abramson, Stone discovered that Atlantic's records were not selling in the southern states because they lacked a certain danceable quality. Stone later said: "I listened to the stuff that was being done by those thrown-together bands in the joints down there, and I concluded that the only thing that was missing from the stuff we were recording was the rhythm. All we needed was a bass line. So I designed a bass pattern, and it sort of became identified with rock'n'roll - doo, da-DOO, DUM; doo, da-DOO, DUM - that thing. I'm the guilty person that started that."

In 1953, he wrote Ray Charles' hit "Losing Hand" (1953), and also wrote "Money Honey", which became the first hit record for The Drifters, topping the national R&B chart for 11 weeks. The following year, he arranged "Sh-Boom" by The Chords.

=== As Charles Calhoun ===
On Ertegun's advice, Stone used the pseudonym of Charles F. Calhoun, a name appropriated from an unknowing local builder, on his BMI tunes to avoid conflict with his membership in the other music licensing society, ASCAP. His best-known composition as Calhoun was "Shake, Rattle and Roll". The song was first recorded by Big Joe Turner in 1954 for Atlantic and was a major hit for the rhythm and blues artist, often cited as one of the first rock and roll records. An even bigger success was a cover version of the song recorded later in 1954 for Decca Records by Bill Haley & His Comets. This version became one of the first rock and roll recordings to sell a million copies and be an international success. It predated Haley's better-known "Rock Around the Clock" by nearly a year.

Stone also co-wrote "Flip, Flop and Fly" with Big Joe Turner, which was another hit. Haley was also fond of the song, and recorded it three times during his career. Stone also had additional Haley connections. Haley's hit, 1955's "Razzle-Dazzle", was another written by Stone under the Calhoun pseudonym. Stone was also credited as co-writer (along with James E. Myers aka Jimmy DeKnight, co-writer of "Rock Around the Clock") of "Rattle My Bones", a song recorded in 1956 by the Comets spin-off group, The Jodimars.

As a bandleader, Stone recorded several singles in the late 1940s and mid 1950s, on RCA Victor, Atlantic and other labels, either under his own name or as "Chuck", "Charles" or "Charlie" Calhoun.

=== Later career ===
In 1960, he served as arranger and orchestra director for a session for LaVern Baker which produced four songs including the hit "Bumble Bee". In 1961, after a brief and temporary retirement, Stone was recruited to run Randy Records in Chicago. However, he left after a few years.

== Honors and awards ==
Stone was honored by the Rhythm and Blues Foundation in 1992 with a Pioneer Award. He was inducted into the Rhythm and Blues Hall of Fame in 1992. He was inducted into the Rock and Roll Hall of Fame in 2010.

== Personal life ==
After leaving Randy Records, Stone relocated to New York and then Florida. In 1975, he married Evelyn McGee (1922–1996), formerly of the International Sweethearts of Rhythm.

Stone died "after a long illness" at age 97 in Altamonte Springs, Florida.

== Discography ==
Jesse Stone & His Band

- "Hey Sister Lucy" / "An Ace In The Hole", RCA-Victor, 1947
- "Who Killed 'er ?" / "Mister Jelly Fingers", RCA-Victor, 1948
- "Don't Let It Get Away" / "The Donkey And The Elephant", RCA-Victor, 1948
- "Who's Zat ?" / "Bling-a-ling-a-ling", RCA-Victor, 1948
- "Get It While You Can" / "Keep Your Big Mouth Shut", RCA-Victor, 1949
- "Cole Slaw" / "Do It Now !" RCA-Victor 22–0026, 1949

Jesse Stone

- "Oh, That'll Be Joyful" / "Runaway", Atlantic, 1954

The Charlie Calhoun Orchestra

- "Smack Dab In The Middle" / "(I Don't Know Why) The Car Won't Go", MGM, 1955

Jesse Stone & His Houserockers

- "Night Life" / "The Rocket", Atco, 1955

Charles Calhoun

- "Jamboree" / "My Pigeon's Gone", Groove, 1956

Chuck Calhoun

- "Hey Tiger" / "Barrelhouse", Atlantic, 1956

== Legacy ==
- Jim Dale covered "Don't Let Go" on the 'b' side of 'Sugartime' (Parlophone R 4402) in 1958.
- Roy Hamilton performed Stone's "Don't Let Go" in 1958. It reached number 2 on the Billboard US R&B charts, and number 13 on the pop charts.
- Elvis Presley performed Stone's "Shake, Rattle and Roll" and "Flip, Flop and Fly" in a medley on the January 28, 1956 broadcast of the Dorsey Brothers Stage Show. He also recorded "Money Honey" in 1956 and "Like a Baby" in 1960.
- Sam Cooke performed Stone's "Shake, Rattle and Roll" on his Night Beat album in 1963.
- Shirley Ellis recorded a version of "Don't Let Go" on her 1965 album The Name Game.
- Davy Graham recorded "Money Honey" on his 1966 album Midnight Man.
- Jerry Lee Lewis recorded many of Stone's songs including "Don't Let Go", "Flip, Flop, and Fly" and "Shake, Rattle and Roll".
- The Jerry Garcia Band performed Stone's "Don't Let Go" live in concert at least 154 times, between March 30, 1976, and April 21, 1995.
- The Steve Miller Band covered "Your Cash Ain't Nothing but Trash" (written as Charles Calhoun) on the 1973 album The Joker. It was also released as a single in 1974.
- Commander Cody and His Lost Planet Airmen covered "Don't Let Go" on their eponymous album (1975).
- Isaac Hayes covered "Don't Let Go" on Polydor's album by the same name in 1979.
- Jeff Lynne covered "Don't Let Go" as track 2 on his 1990 solo album Armchair Theatre.
- Huey Lewis and the News covered "Your Cash Ain't Nothing but Trash" on their 1994 album Four Chords & Several Years Ago.
- The Beatles covered "Shake, Rattle and Roll", which was released in 1996 on The Beatles Anthology 3
- Count Basie wrote in autobiography that Stone had the reputation as the best piano player in Kansas City when Basie first performed there in 1920.
- Kansas City jazz historian Frank Driggs wrote that Stone did the first written horn arrangements for a jazz band, and was instrumental in modernizing the form to be performed in 4/4 time.
- One of the 2010 recipients of the Ahmet Ertegun Award from the Rock and Roll Hall of Fame.
- One of the 2010 inductees in the Songwriters Hall of Fame.
- Ry Cooder covered "Money Honey" on his 1971 album, Into the Purple Valley, and "Smack Dab in the Middle" on Chicken Skin Music.
- Wanda Jackson covered "Like a Baby" on her 2011 album, The Party Ain't Over.
- 38 Special covered "Money Honey" on their 1980 album, Rockin' into the Night.
- The Manhattan Transfer covered "Don't Let Go" on their 1976 album Coming Out.
