= Charlie Ryan =

American country music singer and songwriter (1915–2008)

- Born: Charles Ryan; December 19, 1915; Graceville, Minnesota, U.S.
- Died: February 16, 2008 (aged 92) Spokane, Washington, U.S.
- Genres: Country; rockabilly
- Occupation: Singer-songwriter
- Instruments: Vocals, guitar
- Years active: 1959–1963
- Labels: 4 Star, King, Hilltop

Charles Ryan (December 19, 1915 – February 16, 2008) was an American country music and rockabilly singer and songwriter, best known for writing and first recording the rockabilly hit single "Hot Rod Lincoln".

Charlie released 2 new albums in 2002-2003 with producer and drummer Karl Bingle. The albums featured restored unreleased recordings along with new recordings. There were 2 CD albums released. One entitled "Hot Rod Lincoln", and the other entitled "Meet Mr. Honky Tonk". They were celebrated with a live show at Borders Book Store on July 19th 2003, a day that was designated as "Charlie Ryan Day" by everyone from the local mayor to the Governor.

== Biography ==
Ryan grew up in Polson, Montana and moved to Spokane in 1943. He served in the United States Army during The Korean War. After the war, he worked as a musician and songwriter, touring with artists such as Jim Reeves and Johnny Horton. In 1955, he wrote "Hot Rod Lincoln", and Ryan recorded the first version of the song (as "Charley Ryan and The Livingston Brothers"). Ryan released a remake in 1959 as "Charlie Ryan and The Timberline Riders"; the song was later covered by Johnny Bond (1960) and Commander Cody and His Lost Planet Airmen (1972) (#9 U.S., #7 Canada), among others.

== Discography ==
=== Albums ===
| Year | Album | Label |
|---|---|---|
| 1961 | Hot Rod Lincoln | King |
| 1963 | Hot Rod Lincoln Drags Again! | Hilltop |

=== Singles ===
| Year | Single | Chart Positions | | Album |
| Year | Single | US Country | US | Album |
|---|---|---|---|---|
| 1960 | "Hot Rod Lincoln" | 14 | 33 | Hot Rod Lincoln |
| 1960 | "Side Car Cycle" | — | 84 | Hot Rod Lincoln |
