= Eddie Curtis =

American songwriter (1927–1983)

Eddie "Memphis" Evans Curtis Jr. (17 July 1927 – 22 August 1983) was an American songwriter, born in Galveston, Texas. He is credited as a co-writer along with Steve Miller and Ahmet Ertegun for "The Joker" by the Steve Miller Band, which became a U.S. number one single on the Billboard Hot 100 for the week of January 12, 1974 and U.K. No.1 single in 1990. "The Joker" used a line from Curtis's song, "Lovey Dovey", which was recorded by numerous artists, beginning with the R&B group The Clovers in 1954. Elements of "The Joker" were used for Shaggy's international number one hit "Angel" (2001), which Curtis also received a co-writing credit for.

Curtis also wrote Don Cherry's 1956 hit "Wild Cherry" and Connie Francis' 1959 hit "You're Gonna Miss Me."

Curtis wrote ""It Should've Been Me"," recorded by Ray Charles in 1953 for the Atlantic label. The song also appears on the album We've Got a Live One Here by Commander Cody and His Lost Planet Airmen, recorded in 1976, re-issued in 1996.

Unveiled by Louis Jordan in 1963, Curtis' tune "Hardhead" was first covered by Jordan himself on I Believe in Music (1973), and then in 1992 (as "Hard Head") on Robert Palmer's Ridin' High, accompanied by guitarist Johnny Winter and a big band directed by Clare Fischer. A French version was recorded by Henri Salvador as "Qu'ça saute" on Monsieur Henri (1994).

Curtis died of colon cancer in New York on 22 August 1983, aged 56.
