= Don't Let Go (Jesse Stone song) =

1958 single by Roy Hamilton

Single by Roy Hamilton
- A-side: "The Right to Love"
- Released: 1958
- Genre: Rock and roll
- Length: 2:31
- Label: Epic Records
- Songwriter: Jesse Stone
- Producer: Otis Blackwell

Roy Hamilton singles chronology
"Everybody's Got a Home but Me" (1955)	"Don't Let Go" (1958)	"Pledging My Love" (1958)

"Don't Let Go"

Single by Isaac Hayes

from the album Don't Let Go
- B-side: "You Can't Hold Your Woman"
- Released: August 1979
- Genre: R&B
- Length: 7:16 (album version); 3:57 (single version)
- Label: Polydor
- Songwriter: Jesse Stone
- Producer: Isaac Hayes

Isaac Hayes singles chronology
"Just the Way You Are" (1979)	"Don't Let Go" (1979)	"Do You Wanna Make Love" (1979)

"Don't Let Go" is a song written by Jesse Stone. The song was first a hit for Roy Hamilton in 1958. The Roy Hamilton version reached number 2 on the R&B charts and number 13 on the pop charts.

== Cover versions ==
- In 1974 Mel Tillis and Sherry Bryce recorded the song. The MGM single reached number 11 in the US Country chart.
- In 1974 Commander Cody and His Lost Planet Airmen recorded this song for the Commander Cody and His Lost Planet Airmen and it went to number 56 on the US charts in 1975 and number 85 in Canada.
- In 1978 Tony Orlando as a disco single and on his album Tony Orlando. It was ranked number 9 on the Canadian Dance chart for August 5, 1978.
- In 1979 Isaac Hayes recorded a disco version of the song peaking at number 11 on the soul chart and number 18 on the Hot 100. The song was Hayes' most successful entry on the disco chart, peaking at number 3. In Canada, the song reached number 9 in the Dance charts and number 57 in the Pop charts.
