= Commander Cody and His Lost Planet Airmen =

American country rock band

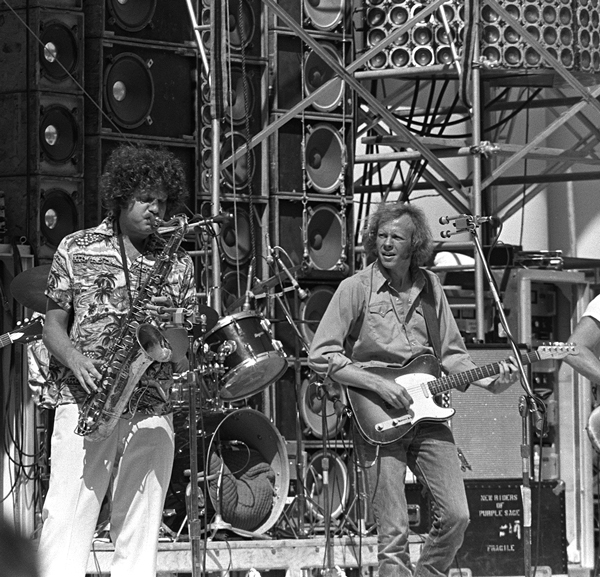
- Andy Stein (L) and John Tichy (R) at the Hollywood Bowl opening for Grateful Dead, July 21, 1974. The Wall of Sound PA is in the background. Photo: David Gans

Background information
- Origin: Ann Arbor, Michigan, U.S.
- Genres: Country rock; alternative country; progressive country; roots rock
- Years active: 1967–1976 as Commander Cody and His Lost Planet Airmen; 1977–2021 as Commander Cody
- Labels: Paramount; Warner Bros.; Arista; Atlantic; Blind Pig; Relix; MCA
- Past members: George Frayne; Billy C. Farlow; Bill Kirchen; John Tichy; Andy Stein; Bruce Barlow; Lance Dickerson; Steve Davis; Bobby Black; Ernie Hagar; Norton Buffalo; Rick Higginbotham; Nicolette Larson; Peter Siegel; Rick Mullen; Steve Barbuto; Mark Emerick; Randy Bramwell; Chris Olsen; Professor Louie; Sean Allen; Tim Eschliman

Commander Cody and His Lost Planet Airmen were an American country rock band founded in 1967. The group's leader and co-founder was pianist and vocalist George Frayne IV, alias Commander Cody (born July 19, 1944, in Boise, Idaho; died September 26, 2021, in Saratoga Springs, New York).

The band became known for marathon live shows. Alongside Frayne, the classic lineup was Billy C. Farlow (b. Decatur, Alabama) on vocals and harmonica; John Tichy (b. St. Louis, Missouri) on guitar and vocals; Bill Kirchen (Kirchen was born in Bridgeport, Connecticut, June 29, 1948, but grew up in Ann Arbor, Michigan) on lead guitar; Andy Stein (b. August 31, 1948, in New York City) on saxophone and fiddle; "Buffalo" Bruce Barlow (b. December 3, 1948, in Oxnard, California) on bass guitar; Lance Dickerson (b. October 15, 1948, in Livonia, Michigan, died November 10, 2003, in Fairfax, California) on drums; and Steve "The West Virginia Creeper" Davis (b. July 18, 1946, in Charleston, West Virginia), followed by Bobby Black, on pedal steel guitar.

== The Lost Planet Airmen ==
Commander Cody and His Lost Planet Airmen formed in 1967 in Ann Arbor, Michigan, United States, with Frayne taking the stage name Commander Cody. The band's name was inspired by 1950s film serials featuring the character Commando Cody and from a feature version of an earlier serial, King of the Rocket Men, released under the title Lost Planet Airmen.

After playing for several years in local bars, in 1969 the core members migrated to Berkeley, California, and soon got a recording contract with Paramount Records. (About a year later, Commander Cody invited western swing revival group Asleep at the Wheel to relocate to the Bay Area.) The group released their first album in November 1971, Lost in the Ozone, which yielded its best-known hit, a cover version of the 1955 song "Hot Rod Lincoln", which reached the top ten on the Billboard singles chart in early 1972. Shortly thereafter drummer Lance Dickerson, Bruce Barlow, the band's manager and the band's bus driver, Ed Dufault, moved to a ranch in Kenwood, California named "The Casa Felice". Here in the basement of one of the 3 houses is where the band set up a studio and practiced for upcoming tours. The tour bus at the time was a converted Greyhound bus with the name and logo "Commander Cody and His Lost Planet Airmen" painted on the side. For a short time, the bus could be seen parked on the side of Warm Springs Road in Kenwood. The band's 1974 live recording, Live from Deep in the Heart of Texas, features cover art of armadillos by Jim Franklin. The band released several moderately successful albums through the first half of the 1970s. Their 1975 album Tales From The Ozone was produced by Hoyt Axton. After appearing in the Roger Corman movie Hollywood Boulevard, Frayne disbanded the group in 1976.

Geoffrey Stokes's 1976 book Star-Making Machinery featured Commander Cody and His Lost Planet Airmen as its primary case study of music industry production and marketing. Stokes relates the difficulties the band had recording its first album for Warner Bros. Records. The label wanted a hit album along the lines of the soft country-rock of The Eagles, but the band was not inclined to change its raw-edged style. The book also detailed various internal conflicts within the band, some related to the recording process, others not.

Later some unauthorized Lost Planet Airmen recordings were released in Europe and Australia along with previously unreleased LPA tracks and some outtakes from existing Paramount and Warner releases.

Kirchen and Stein went on to have successful musical careers, with Kirchen being acknowledged as one of the preeminent Telecaster players in the world. Stein had a long association with the radio program, A Prairie Home Companion. Tichy had previously earned a Ph.D. from the University of Michigan and became head of the Department of Mechanical, Aerospace and Nuclear Engineering at Rensselaer Polytechnic Institute (RPI) in Troy, New York.

"Hot Rod Lincoln", the band's most famous recording, was voted a Legendary Michigan Song in 2008. The following year Commander Cody And His Lost Planet Airmen were inducted into the Michigan Rock and Roll Legends Hall of Fame.

Members of the original group, excepting Frayne, held a 50th anniversary reunion in the San Francisco Bay area in June 2019.

The band disbanded in 1977, but the name "Commander Cody" survived, being used by Frayne in various iterations in his solo career. (Note: "Frayne continued with a solo career, still using his stage name, and toured and released albums under various titles including Commander Cody, the Commander Cody Band, Commander Cody and His Modern Day Airmen and Commander Cody and His Western Airmen.")

== Commander Cody ==
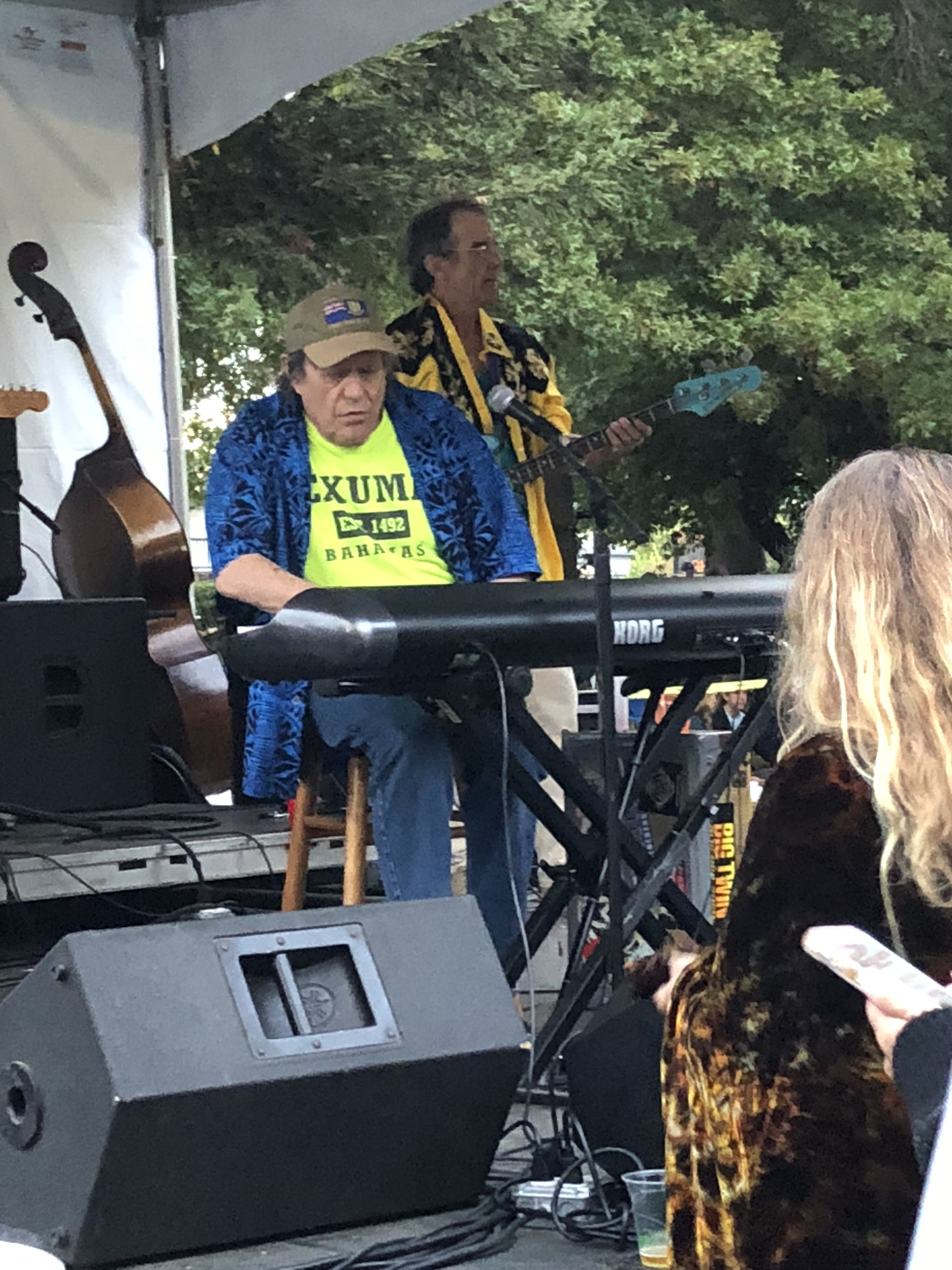
Frayne performing as Commander Cody and His Western Airmen in Sonoma, California, in 2018, with Steve Barbuto, Tim Eschliman, Sean Allen and Peter Seigel

Retaining his stage name, George Frayne had a subsequent solo career, touring and releasing albums from 1977 on under various names including Commander Cody, the Commander Cody Band, Commander Cody and His Modern Day Airmen, and Commander Cody and His Western Airmen.

Frayne was also a visual artist. He received a bachelor's in design from the University of Michigan in 1966 and a master's in Sculpture and Painting from the Rackham School of Graduate Studies of the University of Michigan in 1968. He taught at the University of Michigan and the University of Wisconsin-Oshkosh, and his art was exhibited at numerous shows around the country. He was a student of cinematography, and has a video ("Two Triple Cheese Side Order of Fries") in the Museum of Modern Art's permanent video archive. He has assembled many old movies to go with the band's music as shown on his YouTube channel. Some of his paintings are oversized; most are medium-sized acrylics and present pop art images from media sources and historic photos. His book, Art Music and Life was released by Qualibre Publications in 2009 and is a mix of his best work and anecdotal comments and related stories. He still did portraits of famous automobiles for the Saratoga Auto Museum in Saratoga Springs, New York, where he resided in April, 1997.

George's brother Chris Frayne is credited with the cover art for the Lost in the Ozone, Sleazy Roadside Stories, Hot Licks, Cold Steel & Truckers' Favorites, and Country Casanova albums. He shared credit with George for the album cover for Aces High, and designed other album covers in the music industry. Chris Frayne died in 1992 of multiple sclerosis.

On September 26, 2021, George Frayne died in Saratoga Springs, New York at the age of 77.

== Style and influences ==
Influenced by the rowdy barroom country of Ernest Tubb and Ray Price, Commander Cody and His Lost Planet Airmen's style was built on the foundation of country music, which the band fused with boogie woogie, rock and roll, rhythm and blues, Western swing and jazz, which Classic Rock said resulted in "a counter-cultural twist to the Nashville sound". Relix said that the band "tossed together rockabilly, blues, country, boogie-woogie, Western swing and whatever else came their way." Tinnitist called the band "one of the more interesting bands of the hippie era, fusing county, rockabilly, western swing, jump blues and more into an infectious amalgam that set the table for outfits like NRBQ". All About Jazz described the band's music as "plainly Western Swing—a musically alchemic concoction made up of equal parts country, Western, blues, big band jazz, whiskey and reefer." Pioneers of country rock, roots rock and alternative country, Deadline said that the band "[inspired] the legions of roots-rock and Americana musicians to come." Cashbox said that Commander Cody and His Lost Planet Airmen were also "pioneers of progressive country."

== Members ==
- George Frayne – lead vocals, keyboards (1967–1976)
- Billy Farlow – lead vocals (1967–1976), harmonica (1967–1975)
- Bill Kirchen – lead guitar, backing vocals (1967–1976), trombone (1967–1971), banjo (1973–1975)
- John Tichy – rhythm guitar, backing vocals (1967–1975)
- Andy Stein – saxophone, fiddle (1967–1976)
- Bruce Barlow – bass guitar, upright bass, backing vocals (1967–1976)
- Lance Dickerson – drums, percussion (1967–1976), backing vocals (1974–1976)
- Steve Davis – pedal steel guitar (1967–1971)
- Bobby Black – pedal steel guitar (1972–1976), backing vocals (1973–1976)
- Ernie Hagar – pedal steel guitar (1974–1975)
- Norton Buffalo – harmonica, trombone, backing vocals (1976)
- Rick Higginbotham – rhythm guitar (1975–1976)
- Jack Black – backing vocals, lead guitar (1970–1971)

== Discography ==
=== Albums ===
Commander Cody and His Lost Planet Airmen
Recordings featuring the original Lost Planet Airmen:

Year	Album	Chart Positions			Label	Notes
Year	Album	US	US Country	CAN	Label	Notes
1971	Lost in the Ozone	82	—	75	Paramount	
1972	Hot Licks, Cold Steel & Truckers Favorites	94	—	—	Paramount	
1973	Country Casanova	104	47	—	Paramount	
1974	Live from Deep in the Heart of Texas	105	—	—	Paramount	
1975	Commander Cody and His Lost Planet Airmen	58	—	95	Warner Bros.	
1975	Tales from the Ozone	168	—	—	Warner Bros.	
1976	We've Got a Live One Here!	170	—	—	Warner Bros.	
1988	Sleazy Roadside Stories	—	—	—	Relix	recorded in 1973
1990	Too Much Fun: The Best of Commander Cody and His Lost Planet Airmen	—	—	—	MCA	compilation album
1996	The Tour from Hell – 1973	—	—	—	Aim	recorded in 1973
2003	King Biscuit Flower Hour Archive Series: Greatest Hits Live!	—	—	—	KBFH	recorded in 1976
2020	Bear's Sonic Journals: Found in the Ozone	—	—	—	Owsley Stanley Foundation	recorded in 1970

Commander Cody
Recordings featuring George Frayne with various other musicians:

Year	Album	Chart Positions			Label	Notes
Year	Album	US	US Country	CAN	Label	Notes
1977	Rock 'n Roll Again	163	—	—	Arista	The New Commander Cody Band
1978	Flying Dreams	—	—	—	Arista	Commander Cody
1980	Lose It Tonight	—	—	—	Line	Commander Cody Band
1986	Let's Rock	—	—	—	Blind Pig	Commander Cody
1990	Aces High	—	—	—	Relix	Commander Cody and His Lost Planet Airmen
1994	Worst Case Scenario	—	—	—	Aim	Commander Cody and His Lost Planet Airmen
2000	Live at Gilley's	—	—	—	Atlantic	Commander Cody; recorded in 1982
2005	All the Way Live from Turkey Trot	—	—	—	Fa-Ka-Wee	The Commander Cody Band
2009	Dopers, Drunks and Everyday Losers	—	—	—	Blind Pig	Commander Cody
2013	Live from the Island	—	—	—	Woodstock	Commander Cody and His Modern Day Airmen
2019	Live from Electric City	—	—	—	Liberation Hall	Commander Cody and His Western Airmen

=== Singles ===
Year	Single	Chart Positions						Album
Year	Single	US	US Country	AUS	CAN	CAN Country	CAN AC	Album
1971	"Lost in the Ozone" / "Midnight Shift"	—	—	—	—	—	—	Lost in the Ozone
1972	"Hot Rod Lincoln" / "Wine Do Yer Stuff"	9	51	45	7	—	—	Lost in the Ozone
1972	"Beat Me Daddy, Eight to the Bar" / "Daddy's Gonna Treat You Right"	81	—	—	82	—	—	Lost in the Ozone
1972	"Mama Hated Diesels" / "Truck Stop Rock"	—	—	—	—	—	—	Hot Licks, Cold Steel & Truckers Favorites
1973	"Watch My .38" / "Semi-Truck"	—	—	—	—	—	—	Hot Licks, Cold Steel & Truckers Favorites
1973	"Smoke! Smoke! Smoke! (That Cigarette)" / "Rock That Boogie"	94	97	—	—	99	37	Country Casanova
1973	"Daddy's Drinking Up Our Christmas" / "Honeysuckle Honey"	—	—	—	—	—	—	Non-album track
1974	"Diggy Liggy Lo" / "Sunset on the Sage"	—	—	—	—	—	—	Live from Deep in the Heart of Texas
1974	"Riot in Cell Block #9" / "Oh Mama Mama"	—	—	—	—	—	—	Live from Deep in the Heart of Texas
1975	"Don't Let Go" / "Keep On Lovin' Her"	56	—	—	85	—	—	Commander Cody and His Lost Planet Airmen
1975	"Roll Your Own" / "It's Gonna Be One of Those Nights"	—	—	—	—	—	—	Tales from the Ozone
1977	"Seven Eleven" / "Snooze You Lose"	—	—	—	—	—	—	Rock 'n Roll Again
1978	"Thank You Lone Ranger" / "My Day"	—	—	—	—	—	—	Flying Dreams
1980	"2 Triple Cheese (Side Order of Fries)" / "Rockette 88"	—	—	—	—	—	—	Lose It Tonight
