= It Should've Been Me (Memphis Curtis song) =

Single by Ray Charles
- B-side: "Sinner's Prayer"
- Released: February 1954
- Recorded: May 17, 1953
- Genre: Rhythm and blues
- Label: Atlantic
- Songwriter: Memphis Curtis
- Producer: Ahmet Ertegun

Ray Charles singles chronology
" Feelin' Sad" (1953)	"It Should've Been Me" (1954)	"Don't You Know" (1954)

"It Should've Been Me" is a 1954 rhythm and blues song written by Memphis Curtis, produced by Ahmet Ertegun and recorded and released as a single by American singer Ray Charles.

Recorded at the same May 10, 1953 session as the boogie-woogie-like R&B hit "Mess Around", which was written by Ertegun and released first, "It Should've Been Me" played on a comedic rap vibe/jive in which Charles talked about certain instances where he was smitten with "fine chicks" only to be dismayed that they had partners causing Charles (and in background vocal, Atlantic session musician and writer Jesse Stone), to say "it should have been (him) with (those) real fine chick(s)." Despite being blind since the age of seven, Ray repeatedly states in the song that he saw different things and different "chicks."

Released in early 1954, the song became Charles' first charted hit for Atlantic Records and soon reached number five on the Billboard R&B singles chart.

The song begins:

As I passed by, a real fine hotel, a chick walked out, she sure looked swell..

James Booker covered the song on his album Resurrection Of The Bayou Maharajah (1993) as part of a medley with "Life" and "Wine Spo-Dee-O-Dee".

== Personnel ==
- Lead vocals and piano by Ray Charles
- Background vocals by Jesse Stone
- Produced by Ahmet Ertegun
