= Andy Stein =

American saxophonist and violinist

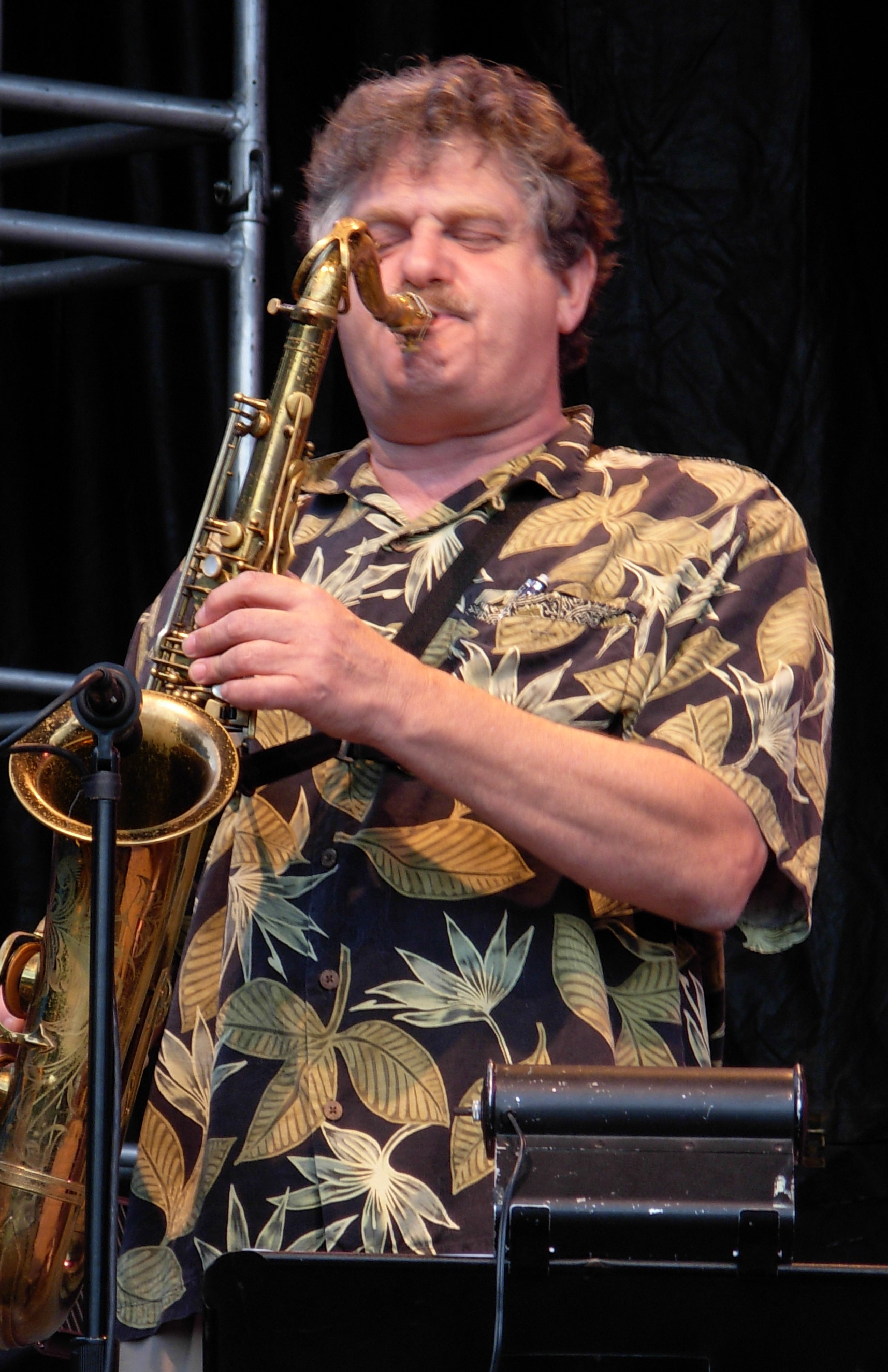
- Stein in 2007

Background information
- Genres: Jazz; country rock; classical
- Instruments: Saxophone; violin
- Member of: The Guys All-Star Shoe Band; Commander Cody and His Lost Planet Airmen; Nighthawks Orchestra
- Education: University of Michigan
- Website: www.andysteinmusic.com

Andy Stein is an American saxophonist and violinist. He is a member of The Guys All-Star Shoe Band on the radio show A Prairie Home Companion and performed on the show's feature film. He was a founding member of the country rock band Commander Cody and His Lost Planet Airmen. Stein attended the University of Michigan as a contemporary of George Frayne ("Commander Cody").

He has also written a number of film scores, including the soundtracks for Hollywood Boulevard (1976), Thunder and Lightning (1977), Deathsport (1978), and National Lampoon's Movie Madness (1983). He played the violin in the Ken Burns documentary series The War (2007) and The West (1996).

Stein playing a Stroh violin with Vince Giordano's Nighthawks Orchestra for a Grand Central Terminal centennial celebration, 2013

Stein has also arranged classical pieces; he reworked Franz Schubert's String Quartet No. 14, D.810 (Death and the Maiden) into a symphony for full orchestra (with winds and timpani) and the Fantasia in F minor for piano four hands into a Fantaisie Concertante for piano and orchestra, and Ludwig van Beethoven's Symphony No. 2 into an octet (for clarinet, horn, bassoon, string quartet, and double bass). These arrangements, along with his composition "Suite for Two" for violin and cello, were repeatedly performed in the United States as well as Europe.

In 2023, Stein contributed to the Martin Scorsese film Killers of the Flower Moon. He is a current member of Vince Giordano's Nighthawks Orchestra.
