= Bill Kirchen =

American musician (born 1948)

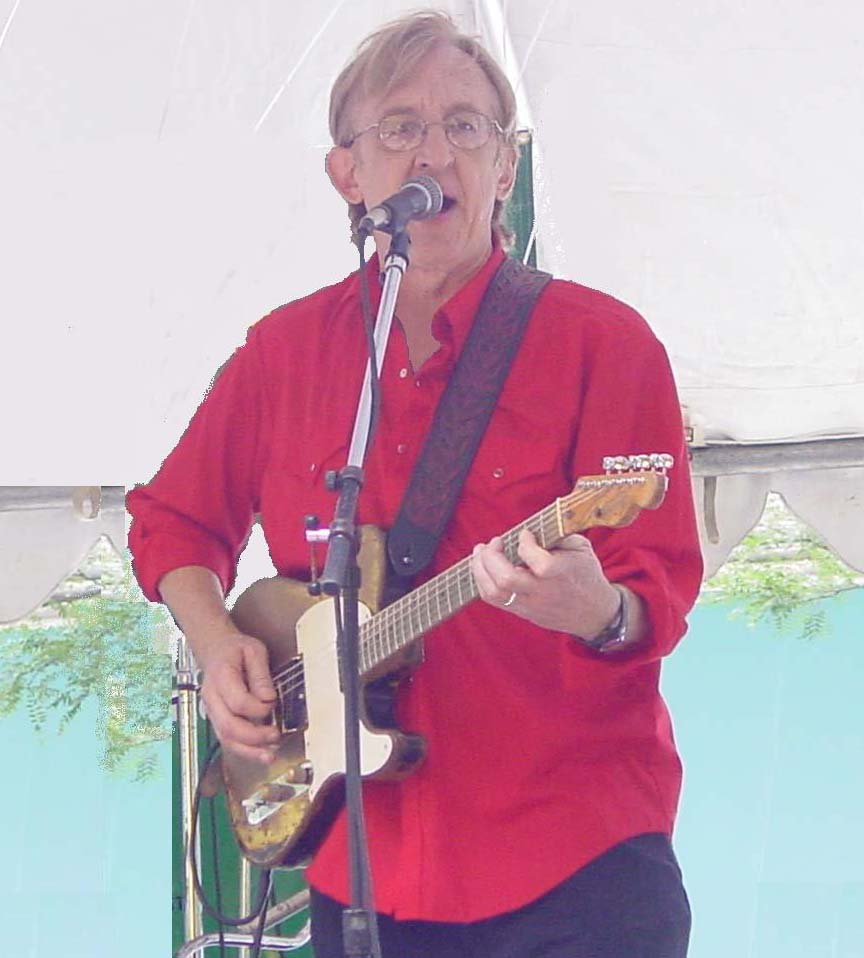
- Kirchen with his original Telecaster in Shirlington, Virginia (2003)

Background information
- Born: June 29, 1948 (age 78); Bridgeport, Connecticut, U.S.
- Genres: Country; rockabilly; rock and roll; country rock; Bakersfield sound; blues; jazz
- Instruments: Guitar; vocals; whistling
- Years active: 1967–present
- Labels: Hightone, Proper, Last Music Co.

William Knight Kirchen (born June 29, 1948) is an American guitarist, singer and songwriter. He was a member of Commander Cody and His Lost Planet Airmen from 1967 to the mid-1970s and later worked with Nick Lowe. Guitar Player magazine described Kirchen as "Titan of The Telecaster" for his prowess on the guitar.

== Early life ==
Kirchen was born in Bridgeport, Connecticut but grew up in Ann Arbor, Michigan. As a boy, Kirchen would regularly sing and whistle and his inspiration was Pete Seeger. Kirchen would constantly whistle while walking his dog as a boy. At age 8, he learned to play the trombone. He attended Ann Arbor High School. He met a folksinger named David Siglin, long-time manager of local folk music venue The Ark, and joined the local folk scene. While learning to play banjo and guitar, his musical interest began to extend beyond folk music and included the blues and various string bands. During his student days at University of Michigan, Ann Arbor, Kirchen started a "psycho folk-rock" band called "The Seventh Seal" and later a country band that included George Frayne and John Tichy which formed the basis for the Commander Cody and His Lost Planet Airmen band.

== Career ==
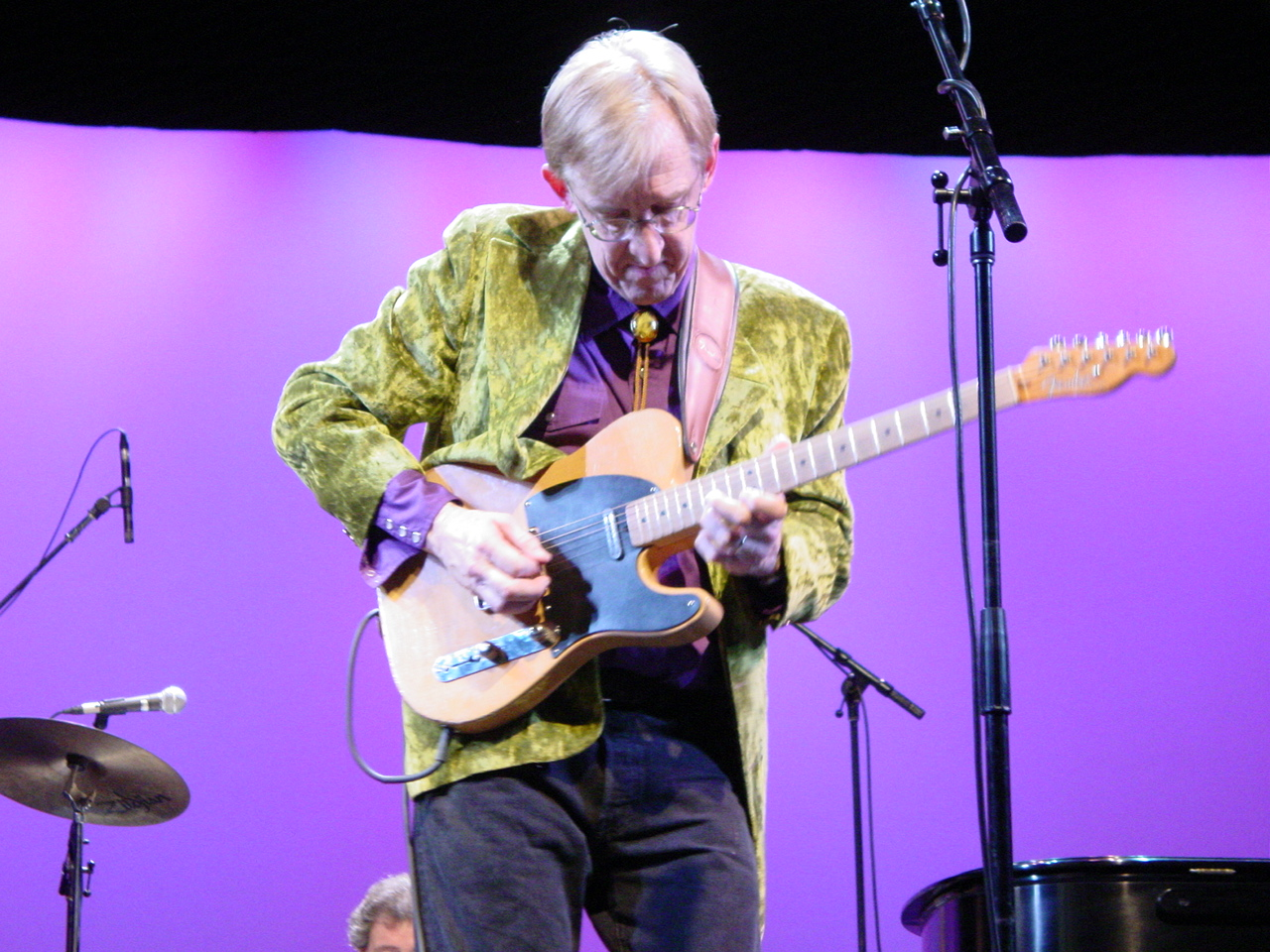
Onstage at the Alden Theater, McLean, Virginia (2004)

In 1969, Kirchen took Commander Cody and the Lost Planet Airmen to California and they developed a reputation as musical "outlaws" that were praised by other outlaw musicians and bands like Willie Nelson, Waylon Jennings, The Grateful Dead and the Allman Brothers Band. Kirchen's band "played a collection of rock 'n' roll, hard-core country, boogie and rockabilly sounds produced in a "high-octane mix" that made them a "happening" group in the San Francisco Bay area.

Kirchen began to develop as guitarist, vocalist, songwriter and performer. He became known for his vocal and guitar work on such songs as "Mama Hated Diesels", "Down to Seeds and Stems Again Blues" from the band's albums, Hot Licks, Cold Steel & Truckers' Favorites and Lost in the Ozone. His live performance work was captured on the 1973 album Live From Deep in the Heart of Texas, recorded at the Armadillo World Headquarters in 1973. Kirchen's Commander Cody band broke apart in 1976 and he formed a "swing orchestra" called the Moonlighters and began a decades-long collaboration with British musician Nick Lowe. Lowe produced the Moonlighters' second album Rush Hour, and Kirchen toured with Lowe and joined him in the studio from time to time. During this period Kirchen also worked on albums with Elvis Costello, Gene Vincent, and Link Wray.

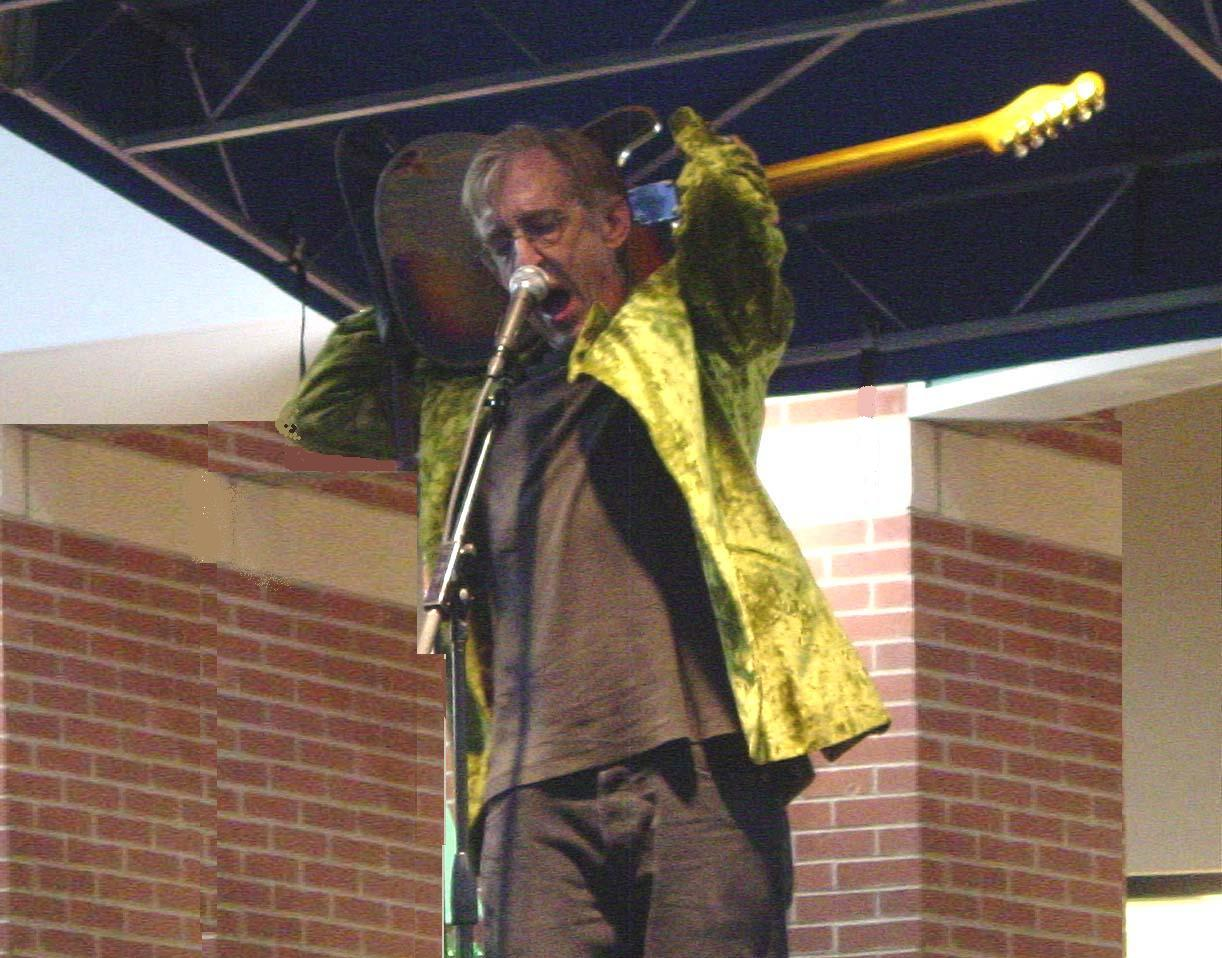
Onstage in Silver Spring, Maryland (2005)

Around 1986, Kirchen moved to the Washington, D.C. area and formed the band Too Much Fun with Dave Elliot on drums and John Previti on bass. In 1996, the band won ten Washington Area Music Awards including Musician and Songwriter of the Year. Kirchen became a contemporary and associate of many D.C. guitarists such as the late Danny Gatton and Roy Buchanan, Link Wray, Tom Principato, Evan Johns, Billy Hancock, Linwood Taylor, Dave Chappell, Jimmy Thackery, the Nighthawks and others who, during this time, forged an elite fraternity of Washington D.C. area roots rock performers.

Kirchen recorded the album Tombstone Every Mile on Demon Records, while in England and then released the recording in the USA after he signed with Black Top Records in 1994. He released the critically acclaimed and musically eclectic album, Have Love, Will Travel in 1996 and Raise a Ruckus on Hightone Records in 1999. Kirchen followed up with more album releases on Hightone Records including Tied to the Wheel in 2001, Dieselbilly Road Trip in 2003, and King of Dieselbilly (2005).

In 2006, Bill kicked off his new deal with Proper Records by recording "Hammer of the Honky-Tonk Gods" at their London studio. The band on the album was Nick Lowe, Geraint Watkins and Robert Trehern and it was engineered by Paul Riley.

This was followed in 2010 by another album – "Word to the Wise", once again recorded at Proper's studio in London by Paul Riley, with a band comprising Austin de Lone, Jonny Castle and Jack O'Dell. The record featured many guests including: Paul Carrack, Elvis Costello, Commander Cody, Blackie Farrell, Dan Hicks, Nick Lowe, Maria Muldaur and more.

In November 2012, Kirchen was a guest performer on Larry Monroe's Texas Radio Live show on KDRP.

2013 saw the third Proper Records album released – also recorded in London by Paul Riley. The band on "Seeds And Stems" was Jack O'Dell and Maurice Cridlin with guest appearances from Austin de Lone and Jorma Kaukonen among others.

=== Legacy ===
Allmusic's Jana Pendragon credits Kirchen with being one of the musicians that pioneered the Americana movement in the 1980s, and also with being a founding father of "twangcore," along with Dave Alvin, Wilco and Big Sandy & His Fly-Rite Boys. Kirchen's signature sound has been dubbed "dieselbilly" and incorporates elements of country, blues, rockabilly, Western swing and boogie-woogie, laced with themes of American truck driving music. Kirchen's work in the early 1970s with Commander Cody and the Lost Planet Airmen helped set the stage for the singers like Waylon Jennings and Willie Nelson and other outlaw country bands with his recordings of songs like "Seeds And Stems." Kirchen is said to have "one of the most distinctive, pure-Fender Telecaster tone guitar sounds in modern music".

Kirchen was named "The Titan of The Telecaster" by Guitar Player magazine for his musical prowess on the Fender Telecaster guitar. He played a 1959 model with a maple fretboard and sunburst finish that he calls the "coal burner", acquired in 1967 when he exchanged his Gibson SG with a stranger on a bus. He eventually retired that guitar.

== Personal life ==
Kirchen is a father and has been married for more than 25 years. In 2005 he moved to the West Coast and then to Manchaca, Texas. In early 2007, he returned to Maryland, then subsequently moved to Austin, Texas in 2011.

== Discography ==
- Tombstone Every Mile (1994)

== Track listing ==
Tombstone Every Mile (1994)
No.	Title	Length
1.	"Bottle Baby Boogie"	3:15
2.	"Tombstone Every Mile"	3:16
3.	"Rockabilly Funeral"	3:41
4.	"Fool On A Stool"	2:40
5.	"One Woman Man"	2:27
6.	"Lovin‘ Cajun Style"	3:13
7.	"Think It Over"	2:39
8.	"Lover‘s Rock"	2:51
9.	"Cool Lovin‘ Baby"	3:34
10.	"Secrets Of Love"	2:43
11.	"Tell Me The Reason"	2:49
12.	"Without Love"	2:40
13.	"All Tore Up"	2:42

- Have Love, Will Travel (1996)

== Track listing ==
Have Love Will Travel (1996)
No.	Title	Length
1.	"Womb To The Tomb"	3:05
2.	"Which Came First"	2:34
3.	"Don‘t Be True"	2:16
4.	"Have Love, Will Travel"	2:36
5.	"High Snakes In Deep Water"	3:30
6.	"Swingin‘ Teardrops"	2:56
7.	"Who‘s That Who"	3:58
8.	"Red Cajun Girl"	3:03
9.	"I Heard The Highway"	3:25
10.	"Nitro Express"	3:17
11.	"The Heart Is A Muscle"	4:09
12.	"What‘s The Matter With The Mill"	3:17
13.	"Swing Fever"	2:34
14.	"I Don‘t Like To Work"	2:30

== Track listing ==
Hot Rod Lincoln Live! (1997)
No.	Title	Length
1.	"Big Mack's Off The Blocks"	3:18
2.	"Looking At The World Through A Windshield"	2:33
3.	"Too Much Fun"	4:24
4.	"Hot Rod Lincoln"	8:13
5.	"Secrets Of Love"	3:01
6.	"Cold Country Blues"	3:35
7.	"Sometimes I Think"	2:13
8.	"Swing Fever"	2:30
9.	"Womb To The Tomb"	3:18
10.	"Tell Me The Reason"	2:56
11.	"Rockin' Over China"	4:19
12.	"The Finger"	1:31

- Raise a Ruckus (1999)
- Tied to the Wheel (2001)
- Dieselbilly Road Trip (2003)
- King of Dieselbilly (2005)
- Hammer of the Honky Tonk Gods (2006)
- Word to the Wise (2010)
- Bill Kirchen's Honky Tonk Holiday (2012)
- Seeds and Stems (2013)
- Tombstone Every Mile (Reissue) (2019)
- The Proper Years (2020)
- Waxworks: The Best of the Proper Years (2020)

== Awards ==
Washington Area Music Awards (Wammies): Best Country/Roots Rock Male Vocalist, 1991; Best Country Male Vocalist, 1993–96; Best Country Male Instrumentalist, 1994–96; Best Country Recording, Best Roots Rock/Traditional Recording, and Best Debut Recording for Tombstone Every Mile, 1994; Best Roots Rock/Traditional R&B Male Vocalist, 1994, 1996, 1997; Musician of the Year, 1994, 1996; Best Country Recording, Best Roots Rock/Traditional R&B Recording, and Best Record Design for Have Love, Will Travel, 1996; Songwriter of the Year, 1996; Best Roots Rock/Traditional R&B Instrumentalist, 1997; inducted into the Washington Area Music Hall of Fame, 2001.
