= Don Nelson (screenwriter) =

American screenwriter and film producer (1927–2013)

- Born: Donald Richard Nelson; January 20, 1927; Hackensack, New Jersey, United States
- Died: September 10, 2013 (aged 86); Studio City, California, United States
- Occupations: US Navy, jazz musician and composer, screenwriter, film producer
- Spouses: Barbara June Eiler; Connie Harper (divorced): Marilyn Nelson
- Children: 2
- Relatives: Alfred Nelson (brother & dentist); Ozzie Nelson (brother); Harriet Hilliard (sister-in-law); David Nelson (nephew); Ricky Nelson (nephew); Kristin Nelson (niece); Tracy Nelson (grand-niece); Matthew Nelson (grand-nephew); Gunnar Nelson (grand-nephew); Sam Hilliard Nelson (grandson-in-law)

Donald Richard Nelson (January 20, 1927 – September 10, 2013) was an American screenwriter, film producer and jazz musician. He is best known for his work on the American situation comedy The Adventures of Ozzie and Harriet, for which he wrote from 1952 to 1966. The series starred his elder brother Ozzie Nelson, his sister-in-law Harriet Nelson and his nephews David Nelson and Ricky Nelson.

Nelson was born in Hackensack, New Jersey, and raised in Tenafly, New Jersey.

Nelson worked for several famous entertainment businesses, including Universal Studios and Fox Studios; he also co-wrote four films for Disney Studios and wrote for the 1968–1970 CBS situation comedy The Good Guys, starring Bob Denver, Herb Edelman, and Joyce Van Patten. During the late 1950s, Nelson started a musical career which lasted over four decades. He had worked with Johnny Varro and was also a member of two Jazz bands. Nelson died at his home in Studio City, California due to Parkinson's disease.
