= The Adventures of Ozzie and Harriet =

American television sitcom (1952–1966)

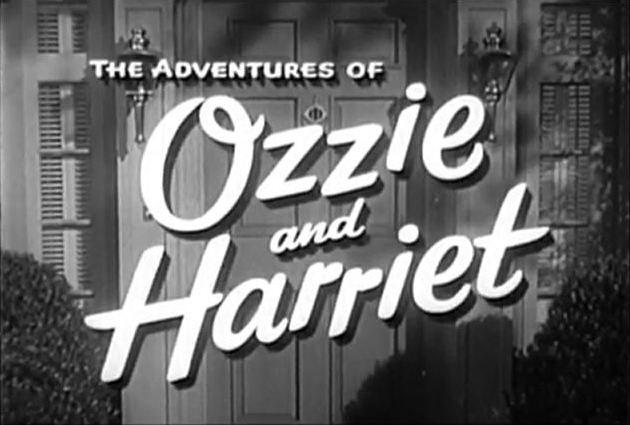
- Created by: Ozzie Nelson
- Directed by: Ozzie Nelson; David Nelson
- Starring: Ozzie Nelson; Harriet Nelson; David Nelson; Ricky Nelson
- Country of origin: United States
- Original language: English
- No. of seasons: 14
- No. of episodes: 435 (list of episodes)

Production
- Camera setup: Single-camera
- Running time: 25 minutes
- Production companies: Stage Five Productions; Volcano Productions; ABC Productions

Original release
- Network: ABC
- Release: October 3, 1952 – April 23, 1966

Related
- Ozzie's Girls

The Adventures of Ozzie and Harriet is an American television sitcom that aired on ABC from October 3, 1952, to April 23, 1966, and starred the real-life Nelson family. After a long run on radio, the show was brought to television, where it continued its success, initially running simultaneously on radio and TV. In terms of seasons, it was the longest-running live-action sitcom in American television history until It's Always Sunny in Philadelphia surpassed it on December 1, 2021 (though it still retains the record in terms of total episodes produced: 435). The series starred the entertainment duo of Ozzie Nelson and his wife, singer Harriet Nelson, and their sons, David and Ricky. Don DeFore had a recurring role as the Nelsons' neighbor, "Thorny."

== Cast ==
=== The Nelsons ===
- Ozzie Nelson
- Harriet Nelson
- David Nelson
- Ricky Nelson

=== Supporting ===
The following represents the show's major supporting cast.

- Don DeFore as Erskin "Thorny" Thornberry
- Parley Baer as Clarence Darby
- Lyle Talbot as Joe Randolph
- Mary Jane Croft as Clara Randolph
- Connie Harper (Constance Nelson) as Miss Edwards
- Skip Young as Wally Plumstead
- Kristin Nelson as Kris Nelson
- June Blair as June Nelson
- Gordon Jones as Butch Barton
- Frank Cady as Doc Frank Elroy Williams
- Lloyd Corrigan as Wally Dipple
- Joseph Kearns as Herb Dunkle
- James Stacy as Fred
- Jack Wagner as the announcer and the soda clerk
- Joe Flynn as Mr. Kelley
- Kent McCord as Kent, Kappa Sigma fraternity brother
- Jimmy Hawkins as Jimmy, Kappa Sigma fraternity brother
- Charlene Salerno as Ginger, Wally Plumstead's girlfriend

== Background ==
=== Early radio days ===
In the early 1930s, a booking at the Glen Island Casino in New Rochelle, New York, gained national network radio exposure for Ozzie Nelson's orchestra. After three years together with the orchestra, Ozzie and Harriet signed to appear regularly on the radio show, The Baker's Broadcast (1933–1938), hosted first by Joe Penner, then by Robert Ripley (famed for Ripley's Believe it or Not!), and finally by cartoonist Feg Murray. The couple married on October 8, 1935, during this series run, and realized working together in radio would keep them together more than continuing their musical careers separately.

=== The Red Skelton Show ===
In 1941, the Nelsons joined the cast of The Red Skelton Show, also providing much of the show's music. The couple stayed with the series for three years. They also built their radio experience by guest appearances, together and individually, on many top radio shows, from comedies such as The Fred Allen Show, to the mystery titan Suspense, in a 1947 episode called "Too Little to Live On".

=== The Adventures of Ozzie and Harriet radio show ===
When Red Skelton was drafted in March 1944, Ozzie Nelson was prompted to create his own family situation comedy. The Adventures of Ozzie and Harriet launched October 8, 1944, on CBS. It moved to NBC in October 1948, then made a late-season switch back to CBS in April 1949. The final years of the radio series were on ABC (the former NBC Blue Network) from October 14, 1949 to June 18, 1954. In total 402 radio episodes were produced. In an arrangement that exemplified the growing pains of American broadcasting, as radio "grew up" into television, the Nelsons' deal with ABC gave the network the option to move their program to television. The struggling network needed proven talent that was not about to defect to the more established and wealthier networks like CBS or NBC.

The Nelsons' sons, David and Ricky, did not join the cast until the radio show's fifth year (initially appearing on the February 20, 1949, episode, at ages 12 and 8, respectively). The two boys were played by professional actors prior to their joining because both were too young to perform. The role of David was played by Joel Davis from 1944 until 1945 when he was replaced by Tommy Bernard. Henry Blair appeared as Ricky. Other cast members included John Brown as Syd "Thorny" Thornberry, Lurene Tuttle as Harriet's mother, Bea Benaderet as Gloria, Janet Waldo as Emmy Lou, and Francis "Dink" Trout as Roger. Vocalists included Harriet Nelson, The King Sisters, and Ozzie Nelson. The announcers were Jack Bailey and Verne Smith. The music was by Billy May and Ozzie Nelson. The producers were Dave Elton and Ozzie Nelson. The show's sponsors included International Silver Company (1944–49), Heinz (1949–52) and Lambert Pharmacal's Listerine (1952–54).

=== Here Come the Nelsons feature film ===
In 1952, the Nelsons starred with Rock Hudson in the Universal-International feature film, Here Come the Nelsons. The film depicted Ozzie as an advertising executive assigned to a campaign promoting women's underwear. The film, produced in the summer of 1951 while the radio show was on hiatus, opened theatrically on February 23, 1952. It also doubled as a pilot for the television series, as Ozzie wanted to see whether his family would be as well accepted on film as they were on radio. The success of Here Come the Nelsons convinced him that Ozzie & Harriet's future was on the small screen, while continuing their weekly radio show.

== Television series ==
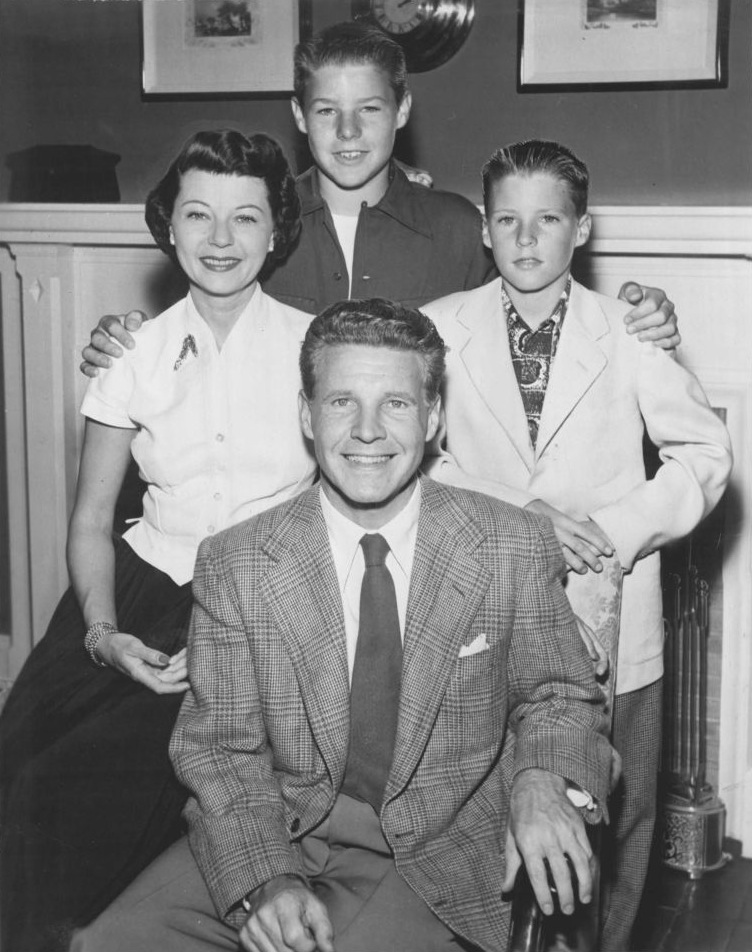
The Nelson family; (clockwise from top) David, Ricky, Ozzie and Harriet, 1952

Before the television series aired, Ozzie Nelson formed his own film production company, Stage Five Productions, and persuaded ABC to agree to a 10-year contract that paid the Nelsons whether the series was canceled or not.

The Adventures of Ozzie and Harriet premiered on ABC on October 10, 1952, staying until April 23, 1966; in 1962, it became the first prime-time scripted series on American television to reach the 10-year milestone. The series strove for realism and featured exterior shots of the Nelsons' actual southern California home at 1822 Camino Palmero Street in Los Angeles as the fictional Nelsons' home. Interior shots were filmed on General Service Studios' Stage 3, recreated to look like the real interior of the Nelsons' home. Viewers naturally assumed the action took place in Los Angeles since the occasional exterior shots were of actual Los Angeles streets rather than a studio backlot. But for many years the opening credits of each episode noted that the Nelson characters were "played by" the Nelson family, as though taking pains to ensure viewers knew these were not literal true-life accounts. A 1959 episode titled "Ozzie Changes History" is devoted entirely to the history of "Warfield," the fictional town where they live.

Like its radio predecessor (which ended in 1954), the series focused mainly on the Nelson family at home, dealing with everyday problems. As the series progressed and the boys grew up, storylines involving various characters were introduced. Many of the series story lines were taken from the Nelsons' real life. When the real David and Rick married June Blair and Kristin Harmon, respectively, their wives joined the cast of Ozzie and Harriet and the marriages were written into the series. What was seldom written into the series was Ozzie's profession or mention of his lengthy and successful band-leading career. The popular joke about his career was that the only time he left the house was to go buy ice cream. According to his granddaughter, actress Tracy Nelson, Ozzie went to Rutgers to study law and when pressed would tell interviewers that the TV Ozzie was a lawyer.

By the mid-1960s, America's social climate was changing, and the Nelsons, symbolizing the 1950s values and ideals, were beginning to seem dated. Ozzie, who wrote and directed all of the series' episodes, attempted to alter the series to fit the times, but most viewers associated the series with a bygone era. The series cracked the top thirty programs in the Nielsen ratings for the first and only time in its eleventh season (1963–1964), when it ranked in 29th place. It made the transition from black-and-white to color in the 1965–66 season. That year, Ozzie tried to recapture the series' early success by introducing nine-year-old Joel Davison and other young children to relate to younger families. Although Davison appeared in three episodes, the series' Nielsen ratings continued to decline. In January 1966, ABC moved the series to Saturdays, where it completed its 14-season run that spring.

Having run for a total of fourteen seasons, The Adventures of Ozzie and Harriet, which averaged 29–30 episodes per season, was at one point the longest-running live-action American television sitcom. On April 1, 2017, It's Always Sunny in Philadelphia was renewed for a thirteenth and fourteenth season, and then through an eighteenth season on December 10, 2020, which led to its breaking the record for longest-running live-action scripted comedy series, but those seasons amount to only around a third as many episodes as Ozzie and Harriet.

=== Broadcast history ===
- Fridays at 8:00–8:30 PM, October 3, 1952 – June 8, 1956
- Wednesdays at 9:00–9:30 PM, October 3, 1956 – June 11, 1958
- Wednesdays at 8:30–9:00 PM, October 1, 1958 – May 10, 1961
- Thursdays at 7:30–8:00 PM, September 28, 1961 – June 6, 1963
- Wednesdays at 7:30–8:00 PM, September 18, 1963 – January 5, 1966
- Saturdays at 7:30–8:00 PM, January 15, 1966 – April 23, 1966

=== Springboard for Ricky Nelson's music career ===
The Adventures of Ozzie and Harriet made the Nelsons' younger son, Rick, into a music teen idol. Ozzie realized the impact his musically gifted son could have on the series, and went on to write storylines featuring Rick singing. Rick first sang in the April 10, 1957, episode, "Ricky the Drummer," performing a version of Fats Domino's hit "I'm Walkin", and later signed a recording contract with Domino's label, Imperial Records. Subsequent episodes that aired after Rick became one of the nation's most successful musicians were some of the series' highest-rated episodes.

== Syndication ==
In the decades since the series' cancellation, it has been continuously shown on stations using extensively edited prints. Between 1985 and 1994, The Disney Channel aired the series as remastered from original 35mm film elements, with new introductions by Harriet Nelson.

The series was also aired on the Nostalgia TV Network in the mid 1990s. It also has aired on Catchy Comedy as part of their "Christmas Binge" on the weekends of December 16–17, 2023 and December 14–15, 2024, primarily airing their Christmas themed episodes, and had its own binge on March 16, 2025. It was then added to their regular lineup on February 15, 2026.

PBS member station KVCR-TV in San Bernardino, California (in the Los Angeles market) aired the series as late as May 2010, connected to the station's nostalgic television series, I Remember Television.

In 2025, the series is available for streaming via Tubi.

== Home media ==
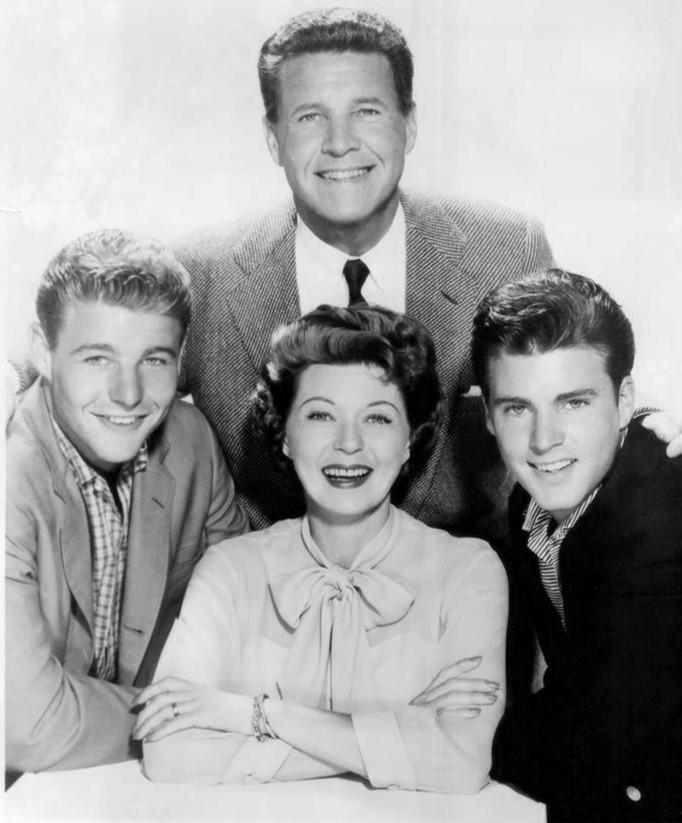
The Nelson family; (clockwise from top) Ozzie, Ricky, Harriet and David, 1960

Over the years, as a result of several low budget, extensively edited episodes being unofficially released on home video, including VHS and DVD by various unofficial distributors, it was incorrectly presumed that the series had fallen into the public domain. However, in addition to song performances by Ricky Nelson, the theme music and other cues, new copyrights for the episodes have been registered with the Library of Congress to protect the series as the exclusive property of Ozzie & Harriet Enterprises and the Rick Nelson Company LLC.

Ozzie & Harriet Enterprises, LLC and The Rick Nelson Company LLC (the Nelson family companies) also own the rights to the original film elements. An officially released video version of The Best of the Adventures of Ozzie and Harriet was released May 1, 2007, by Shout! Factory under license from The Rick Nelson Company. Additionally, Ozzie & Harriet Enterprises and the Rick Nelson Company LLC currently hold copyright and ownership for any new material derived from the film elements. In 2021, the home entertainment distribution rights were acquired by MPI Home Video. Rick Nelson's son Sam Nelson (President of Ozzie & Harriet Enterprises) headed a project that restored and digitally remastered all 435 episodes from the original 35mm network negatives, including the original cast commercials. A selection of 100 of the restored episodes were first made available via a direct response offer from Time-Life in association with MPI in 2021.

On June 21, 2022, the complete restored, digitally remastered seasons one and two were released on DVD, marking the first time authorized, complete seasons of the show have been released on home video. As of October 10, 2023, all fourteen seasons of the show have been issued, with the entire series boxed set released December 19, 2023. Many of these episodes are being made available for the first time since they first aired.

Episodes of the television series have been screened at the non-profit Mid-Atlantic Nostalgia Convention held annually in Aberdeen, Maryland. 16 mm prints were used.

Author Jim Cox addressed the radio program's cultural significance in an article that appeared in SPERDVAC's Radiogram in early 2008.

== Ozzie's Girls ==
In September 1972, six years after the show ended, NBC aired a pilot episode for a revival of the Ozzie and Harriet storyline. In the episode, Ozzie and Harriet rent the boys' old room to two college students, portrayed by Susan Sennett and Brenda Sykes, after David and Ricky move out. David Nelson served as producer; Ricky Nelson, at this point in his career distancing himself from his past, had no involvement. Storylines centered around the Nelsons' attempts to solve the problems of two girls after having raised two boys. NBC passed on the series, but Viacom and Filmways agreed to put the show into production and distribute it in syndication.

Ozzie's Girls premiered on local stations, including New York's WABC-TV, in September 1973. It ended in September 1974 after one season. (Though the show was never a major hit, Ozzie's health was beginning to fail at the same time, and he would die in June 1975, less than a year after Ozzie's Girls ended.)

== The Nelsons' post-TV lives ==
=== Ozzie ===
Ozzie Nelson continued to work in show business after the failure of the short-lived sitcom Ozzie's Girls. He took on the role of producer and director for some of TV's popular series, most notably Adam-12, The D.A., and Bridget Loves Bernie. In 1975, Ozzie Nelson died of liver cancer at the age of 69.

=== Rick ===
In the years after Ozzie and Harriet was cancelled, Rick Nelson's career and personal life changed drastically. Rick continued to record and perform music. He shied away from his teen idol image and sound, forming the rock and roll/country-fused Stone Canyon Band. Rick and the Stone Canyon Band had success with the 1972 single, "Garden Party". Rick and the Band wrote the song in response to their perception of having been booed off the stage at a rock and roll revival concert at Madison Square Garden after including some newer songs in their set, following the performance of his old hits. In fact, the audience commotion was related to security removing a drunk in the crowd. Throughout the 1970s, Rick was riddled with debt. In 1981, he and wife Kristin Harmon divorced. While touring the United States, en route to a New Year's Eve concert in Dallas, Rick Nelson was killed in a plane accident on December 31, 1985, in DeKalb in Bowie County in northeast Texas. In 1987, Rick was inducted posthumously into the Rock and Roll Hall of Fame.

=== Harriet ===
Following Ozzie's death in 1975, Harriet grew reclusive. In 1989, she made her last onscreen appearance in her granddaughter Tracy Nelson's TV series, Father Dowling Mysteries. Harriet never fully recovered from Rick's death and died of congestive heart failure and emphysema in 1994 at the age of 85.

Ozzie, Harriet, and Rick are interred together at Forest Lawn, Hollywood Hills Cemetery, in Los Angeles, California.

=== David ===
David Nelson continued to produce feature films and television commercials and owned his commercial production company. David died from colon cancer on January 11, 2011.

== Legacy ==
The series attracted large audiences and became synonymous with the 1950s ideal American family life. Although it was never a top-ten hit, Nelson's long-term contract with ABC and the lower expectations that came with being on the lowest-rated of the Big Three television networks at the time ensured that the show accrued enough episodes to remain the longest-running live-action sitcom in United States television history until It's Always Sunny in Philadelphia was renewed for a 15th season in 2021, while also still maintaining the record for most number of episodes aired to the present day for any live-action American sitcom.
