= Here Come the Nelsons =

1952 film by Frederick de Cordova

- Theatrical poster
- Directed by: Frederick de Cordova
- Written by: William Davenport; Donald Nelson; Ozzie Nelson
- Produced by: Aaron Rosenberg
- Starring: Ozzie Nelson; Harriet Nelson; David Nelson; Ricky Nelson; Rock Hudson
- Cinematography: Irving Glassberg
- Edited by: Frank Gross
- Music by: Herman Stein
- Production company: Universal Pictures
- Distributed by: Universal Pictures
- Release date: February 23, 1952 (United States)
- Running time: 75 minutes
- Country: United States
- Language: English

Here Come the Nelsons is a 1952 American comedy film directed by Frederick de Cordova and starring real-life husband and wife Ozzie and Harriet Nelson and their sons David and Ricky Nelson. The supporting cast includes Rock Hudson, Sheldon Leonard, Jim Backus, Gale Gordon and Chubby Johnson.

Here Come the Nelsons doubled as the pilot episode for the television series The Adventures of Ozzie and Harriet.

== Plot ==
When Ozzie tries to drive some publicity for an advertising agency, David and Ricky become involved with gangsters.

== Cast ==
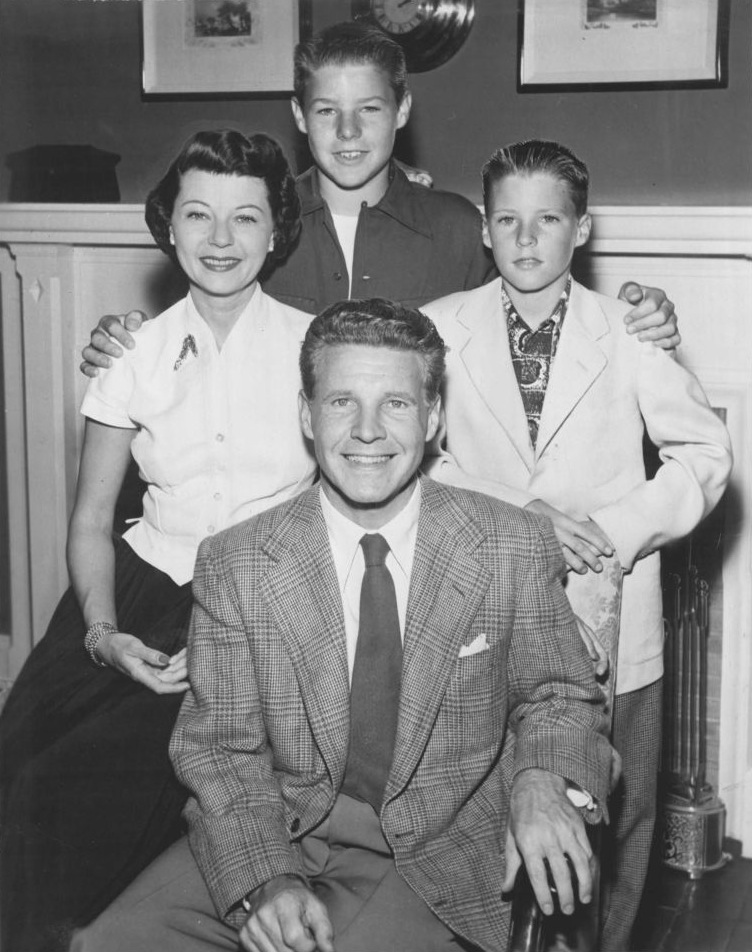
The Nelsons in 1952

- Ozzie Nelson as Ozzie Nelson
- Harriet Nelson as Harriet Nelson
- David Nelson as David Nelson
- Ricky Nelson as Ricky Nelson
- Rock Hudson as Charles E. "Charlie" Jones
- Barbara Lawrence as Barbara Schutzendorf
- Sheldon Leonard as Duke
- Jim Backus as Joe Randolph
- Paul Harvey as Samuel T. Jones
- Gale Gordon as H.J. Bellows
- Ann Doran as Clara Randolph
- Chubby Johnson as Tex, Man at Fair
- Edwin Max as Monk
