= Bridget Loves Bernie =

American sitcom

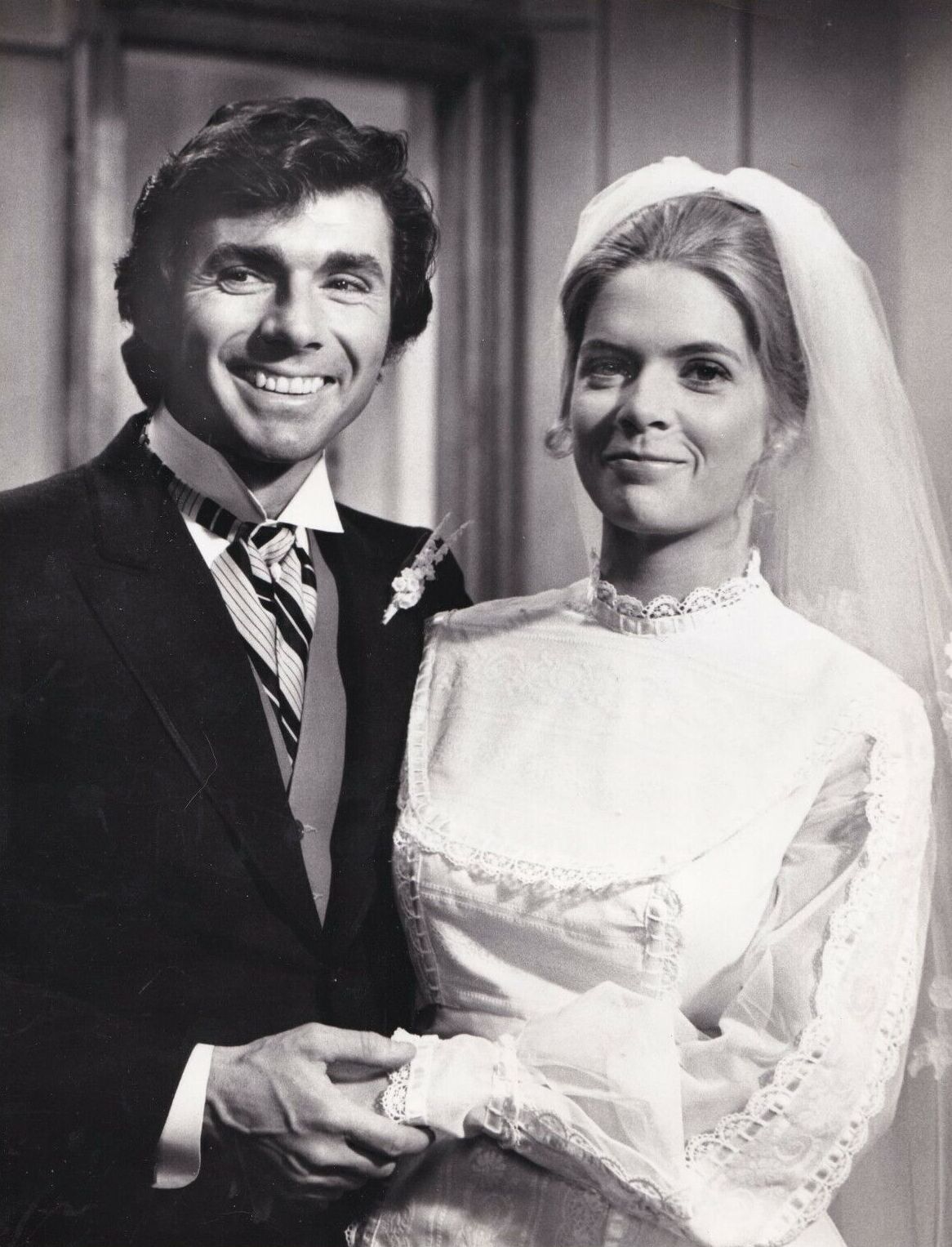
- The wedding photo.
- Created by: Bernard Slade
- Starring: Meredith Baxter; David Birney; Audra Lindley; David Doyle; Harold J. Stone; Ned Glass; William Elliott; Bibi Osterwald; Robert Sampson
- Theme music composer: Jerry Fielding; Diane Hildebrand
- Opening theme: "Love Is Crazy"
- Composer: Jerry Fielding
- Country of origin: United States
- Original language: English
- No. of seasons: 1
- No. of episodes: 24

Production
- Executive producer: Douglas S. Cramer
- Producers: Jerry London (pilot); Don Nelson; Arthur Alsberg
- Running time: 26 minutes
- Production companies: The Douglas S. Cramer Company; Thornhill Productions; Screen Gems

Original release
- Network: CBS
- Release: September 16, 1972 – March 3, 1973

Bridget Loves Bernie is an American sitcom that aired on CBS from September 16, 1972, to March 3, 1973. The series, created by Bernard Slade, depicted an interfaith marriage between a Catholic woman and a Jewish man. It stars Meredith Baxter and David Birney as the title characters. CBS canceled the show after only one season despite very high ratings.

Baxter and Birney later married in real life in 1974 after the program had left the air and Baxter was known in her professional career for several years as Meredith Baxter Birney.

== Overview ==
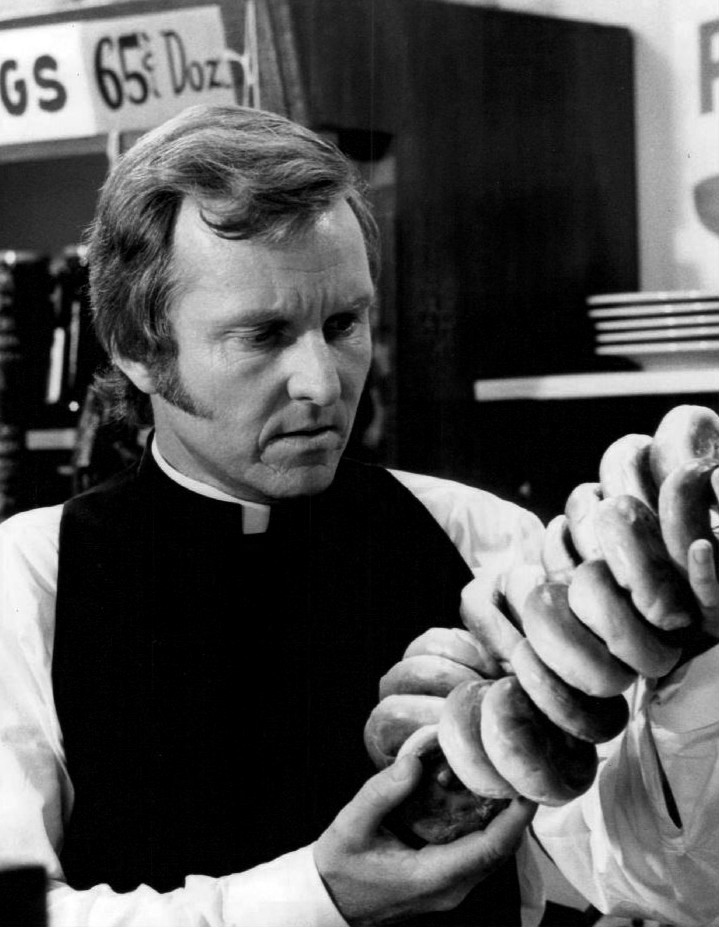
Father Mike picking up the Archbishop's weekly bagel supply

The series depicts an interfaith marriage between an Irish Catholic teacher (Bridget Fitzgerald) from a wealthy family and a Jewish cab driver who aspires to be a playwright (Bernie Steinberg), whom she had met at a bus stop. With a primetime slot between All in the Family and The Mary Tyler Moore Show on Saturday nights, the situation comedy was No. 5 in the ratings among all shows for the 1972-73 television season and obtained a 24.2 rating, tying The NBC Sunday Mystery Movie. However, CBS executives canceled the show in response to negative reactions to the characters' marriage, the show thus being the highest-rated television program to be canceled after only one season.

Supporting cast members included Audra Lindley, David Doyle, Harold J. Stone, Ned Glass and Bibi Osterwald. Lindley and Doyle played Bridget's wealthy parents, Walter and Amy Fitzgerald, and Stone and Osterwald played Bernie's lower-class parents, Sam and Sophie Steinberg. The Steinbergs owned a delicatessen above which Bridget and Bernie lived. Glass played Bernie's uncle, Moe Plotnik. Robert Sampson played Bridget's brother, Catholic priest Father Michael Fitzgerald; he was more sympathetic than others to his sister's marriage. Bill Elliott played Otis, Bernie's best friend and fellow cab driver. Nancy Walker was cast as Bernie's religious Jewish Aunt Ruthie and Nora Marlowe was cast as Bridget's nun Aunt Agnes in the 1972 episode "The Little White Lie That Grew and Grew".

== Cast ==
- David Birney as Bernie Steinberg
- Meredith Baxter as Bridget Fitzgerald Steinberg
- Bibi Osterwald as Sophie Steinberg
- Harold J. Stone as Sam Steinberg
- Audra Lindley as Amy Fitzgerald
- David Doyle as Walter Fitzgerald
- Ned Glass as Moe Plotnik
- Robert Sampson as Father Michael Fitzgerald
- Bill Elliott as Otis Foster

== Controversy ==
The series was controversial because of the differing faiths of the married characters. Some Jewish groups charged that the series "mocked the teachings of Judaism". Rabbi Wolfe Kelman, executive vice-president of the Rabbinical Assembly of America, called the show "an insult to some of the most sacred values of both the Jewish and Catholic religions". Rabbi Meir Kahane wrote an essay on the series. Orthodox rabbis met with CBS officials several times. A Conservative rabbi organized a boycott by advertisers, and Reform rabbis met with CBS staff in secret to have the show canceled. Rabbi Abraham Gross, president of the Rabbinical Alliance of Orthodox Rabbis and Educators, described the show as a "flagrant insult" to Jews, protesting that intermarriage was strictly forbidden under Jewish law. Threats followed; Meredith Baxter said, "We had bomb threats on the show. Some guys from the Jewish Defense League came to my house to say they wanted to talk with me about changing the show." Threatening phone calls made to the home of producer Ralph Riskin resulted in the arrest of Robert S. Manning, described as a member of the Jewish Defense League.

== Episodes ==
No.	Title	Directed by	Written by	Original release date
1	"Bridget Loves Bernie"	Richard Kinon	Bernard Slade	September 16, 1972
Series pilot: It's love at first sight when cab driver (and struggling writer) Bernie Steinberg picks up his fare, Bridget Fitzgerald, on a rainy New York day.
2	"A Funny Thing Happened on the Way to the Vatican"	Lee Philips	John McGreevey	September 23, 1972
Bernie's parents, Sam and Sophie, win a raffle ticket for a private audience with Pope Paul VI that was sold by Bridget's mother, Amy. Her father, Walt, fears that the Steinbergs may end up causing him major embarrassment.
3	"Wake Up, We're Getting Married Today"	Richard Kinon	Don Nelson and Arthur Alsberg	September 30, 1972
After being married in a civil ceremony, Bridget and Bernie agree to their parents' wishes to have a religious ceremony, but the conflict of religions causes havoc.
4	"The Last of the Red Hot Playwrights"	Richard Kinon	Bernard Slade	October 7, 1972
Despite several rejections, a reluctant Bernie decides to write a play drawn from his own experiences and personal acquaintances.
5	"Who's Watching the Store?"	Lee Philips	Jerry Mayer	October 14, 1972
Confusion and chaos reign when Catholic Bridget runs a Jewish delicatessen, aided by her socialite mother and brother who's a priest.
6	"The Newlybeds"	Richard Kinon	Warren S. Murray	October 21, 1972
Trying to replace a perennially-breaking bed results not only in sleeping trouble for Bridget and Bernie, but also causes an inter-family squabble.
7	"Happiness Is Just a Thing Called Moe"	Hal Cooper	Lloyd Turner and Gordon Mitchell	October 28, 1972
Bernie's Uncle Moe falls in love with Bridget's aunt, which leads to all sorts of trouble.
8	"Bernie's Last Stand"	Richard Kinon	Burt and Adele Styler	November 4, 1972
Despite a generous (and belated) wedding gift of one year's free rent on a plush apartment from Walt and Amy, Bridget and Bernie are reluctant to accept the offer.
9	"How to Be a Jewish Mother"	Richard Kinon	George Burditt and Paul Wayne	November 11, 1972
After Bernie rejects Bridget's breakfast of ham and eggs, she decides to take a crash course in Jewish cooking, which leads to disaster.
10	"The Little White Lie That Grew and Grew"	Don Nelson and Arthur Alsberg	Lee Philips	November 18, 1972
Bridget and her parents become Jewish for the weekend when Bernie's devout aunt stops in New York on her way back from Israel.
11	"The In-Laws Who Came to Dinner"	Richard Kinon	Jerry Mayer	November 25, 1972
Walt and Amy fear that their ability to influence an important art collector will be compromised when the in-laws move in after smoke damage currently has their apartment under repair.
12	"The Homecoming"	Ezra Stone	Bernard Slade	December 2, 1972
Bridget and Bernie spend the weekend at the Fitzgerald country estate and after Bernie meets some of Bridget's friends, he becomes aware of the style to which she was previously accustomed.
13	"You Are Cordially Not Invited"	Hal Cooper	Ron Friedman	December 9, 1972
Sam and Sophie aren't invited to a party that Walt and Amy are holding for United Nations delegates. However, Sophie is determined to attend after discovering Moshe Dayan will be the guest of honor.
14	"'Tis the Season"	Alan Rafkin	Joanna Lee	December 16, 1972
Bridget and Bernie reach the holiday season unsure of whether to celebrate Christmas or Hanukkah.
15	"Belated Honeymoon"	Coby Ruskin	Joanna Lee	December 23, 1972
Increasing tensions between Bridget and Bernie lead both sets of parents to send them on the honeymoon they never had.
16	"Honesty Is the Worst Policy"	Richard Kinon	Howard Merrill	January 6, 1973
Bernie is distressed when he discovers that Bridget was engaged when they met and never once mentioned there being another man in her life.
17	"Life Begins at 65"	James Sheldon	Jack Hanrahan and Don Sherman	January 13, 1973
After Uncle Moe turns 65, he runs away from home after Sam and Sophie decide he should retire from the deli.
18	"With This Ring"	Ozzie Nelson	Gordon Farr and Arnold Kane	January 20, 1973
Bernie is finally able to buy Bridget an engagement ring, but she quickly loses it.
19	"Into Every Life, a Little Snow Must Fall"	James Sheldon	Elias Davis	January 27, 1973
Bridget and Bernie talk their fathers into spending a weekend at Walt's hunting lodge.
20	"To Teach or Not to Teach"	James Sheldon	Don Nelson and Arthur Alsberg	February 3, 1973
Bridget announces that she's going to teach a sex education class to her fourth graders.
21	"Painting, Painting – Who's Got the Painting?"	Ozzie Nelson	Bill Dana	February 10, 1973
Bridget has a hard time finding a home for a painting that once hung in her nursery until she discovers a potentially rare painting is found hidden under the surface of the canvas.
22	"Steinberg and Son"	Richard Kinon	Jerry Mayer	February 17, 1973
Sam and Walt each get the chance to realize their dream of having Bernie work for them.
23	"The Information Gap"	Ozzie Nelson	Marty Roth	February 24, 1973
In an effort to get some measure of privacy, Bridget and Bernie decide to ignore all questions and phone calls from their parents.
24	"Greener Pastures"	Bill Bixby	Rick Mittleman	March 3, 1973
Bernie is offered the opportunity to work for a newspaper in Providence.

== Home media ==
On December 4, 2012, Sony Pictures Home Entertainment released the complete series as a manufacture-on-demand DVD set in Region 1, available in the U.S. exclusively through Amazon.com and WBShop.com. The complete series is set for a Blu-ray release on September 22, 2026.

== In popular culture ==
Bridget Loves Bernie was referenced to in the MAD Magazine article "M*A*S*Huga" (its first satire of the M*A*S*H TV series) which appeared in Issue # 166 (April 1974). The Surgeon General stated to "Cockeye Piercer" and "Crapper John" that they were put in-between The Mary Tyler Moore Show and All in the Family only because religious groups objected to Bridget Loves Bernie, which was a reference to the fact that M*A*S*H was put in the time slot in between those two shows in the 1973–74 TV season after the cancellation of Bridget Loves Bernie.

== See also ==
- Abie's Irish Rose: 1946 comedy film depicting a similar interfaith marriage
- The Cohens and Kellys: 1926 film with a similar plot
