= Smash-Up on Interstate 5 =

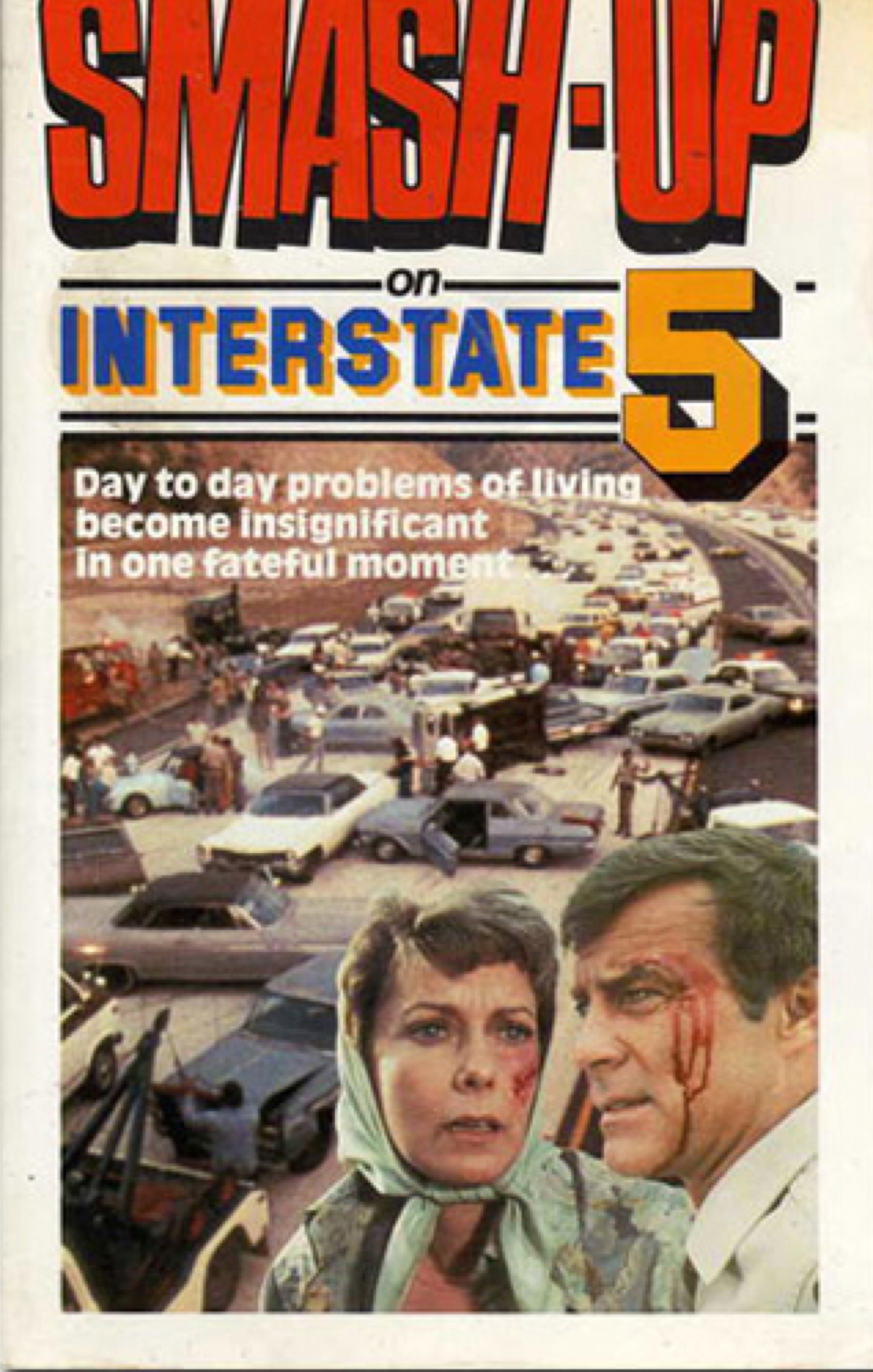
- Genre: Drama
- Based on: Expressway by Elleston Trevor (as Howard North)
- Written by: Eugene Price; Robert Presnell Jr.
- Directed by: John Llewellyn Moxey
- Starring: Robert Conrad; Sian Barbara Allen; Buddy Ebsen; Vera Miles
- Music by: Bill Conti
- Country of origin: United States
- Original language: English

Production
- Executive producer: Edward S. Feldman
- Producer: Roger Lewis
- Production locations: Interstate 210, La Crescenta, California
- Cinematography: John M. Nickolaus Jr.
- Editor: John A. Martinelli
- Running time: 100 minutes
- Production company: Filmways Television

Original release
- Network: ABC
- Release: December 3, 1976

Smash-Up on Interstate 5 is a 1976 American made-for-television disaster film directed by John Llewellyn Moxey. Loosely based on the 1973 novel Expressway written by Elleston Trevor under the pseudonym Howard North, the film chronicles the aftermath of a 39-car smash-up in California.

== Plot ==
The film is set on Interstate 5 in California on the date of July 4, 24 hours before the summer vacation will officially commence. From the beginning, California Highway Patrol sergeant Sam Marcum (Robert Conrad) announces in a voice-over that a 39-car smash-up will be the cause of 62 injured people and fourteen deaths. A selection of the people involved are followed up to 48 hours preceding the accident. Besides Sam, who is chasing the murderer of his colleague on the highway, the film focuses on the elderly couple Al and June Pearson (Buddy Ebsen and Harriet Nelson), who are setting out to a beach resort to forget the fact that June is suffering from a terminal disease. Meanwhile, a woman named Erica (Vera Miles) is troubled by a gang of bikers including rebellious Burnsey (Sue Lyon), when she is rescued by young Dale (David Groh). In other sub-plots, Lee Bassett (Scott Jacoby) becomes a murder suspect when he is forced to pick up a young couple on the run, Penny and Pete (Bonnie Ebsen and George O'Hanlon, Jr.). Laureen (Donna Mills), a nurse with feelings for Sam, struggles with doubts of marrying him. Barbara Hutton (Sian Barbara Allen), a young mother, is panicked when she finds her husband Jimmy (Tommy Lee Jones), an officer, shot. All these stories come together when a massive car crash changes their lives for good.

43 hours before the accident, Erica meets with her colleague Trudy (Terry Moore) at a sleazy bar, where she is introduced to a free-spirited life style. She is picked up by a doctor, Danny (Herb Edelman), but leaves the bar without him, despite his attempts to flirt with her. Meanwhile, Penny and Pete rob a gas station, and a gunfight leaves Pete injured, and the gas station owner shot. Seventeen hours later, they steal a car and force the owner, Lee Bassett, to drive under gunpoint. Nearby, Sergeant Marcum holds a truck for speeding, driven by Randy (Barry Hamilton), and issues a warning to the owner, who is in the back having intercourse with a woman (Cindy Daly).

Two hours later, Erica is phoned by Danny, who is warning her that he will come over. To flee the home, Erica calls her daughter Susie, asking her if she can come over in Los Angeles. Meanwhile, Pete shoots Officer Hutton when he attempts to hold him and Penny and Lee over. Unbeknownst to Pete, Hutton's wife Barbara has just gone into labor and requests Jimmy's presence. Laureen, who assists the birth, is bothered by Sam yet again. She tries to explain that she does not want to marry a man with a dangerous job, considering her wish to start a happy family. The discussion is interrupted by the news of Jimmy's death, leaving Barbara heartbroken. Back at the car with the fugitive couple, Lee is able to steal Pete's gun due to Pete's severe injuries, and leaves only to steal another car, afraid that the police will account him as an accessory to murder because of his past as a criminal. Penny, who does not know Pete very well, convinces Lee to take her with him.

Sometime later, a group of bikers start to harass Erica on the road. Medical school drop-out and truck driver Dale witnesses the situation and starts a fight, which lasts until the bikers hear police sirens. The police, though, are more occupied with Lee's car, which they find with Pete's now lifeless body in it. At the beach house, June enjoys and appreciates her husband's presence, though secretly suffers from her disease and refuses to take her medicine. Instead, she walks into the ocean and attempts to drown herself, only to be rescued by her husband.

Just over 15 hours before the accident, Erica grows accustomed to Dale and spends the night with him in a motel, even though she has some doubts about his young age. Nearby, romance also blossoms between Lee and Penny when she tells him about her troubled childhood. The following morning, only an hour before the smash-up, June tries to explain her suicide attempt, while Erica breaks up with Dale, afraid of commitment. Dale initially accepts the situation and drives off but soon makes a U-turn to follow Erica, declaring his love to her from his car. Meanwhile, Sergeant Marcum is informed which van fugitive Lee and Penny are driving and starts a massive chase. The smash-up soon ensues, killing Lee, Penny, Al, and Burnsey's biker boyfriend Andy (Joel Parks) and badly injuring Dale. When Laureen arrives at the scene, she realizes how much she cares for Sam, and they reconcile while taking care of the injured people.

== Cast ==
- Robert Conrad as Sergeant Sam Marcum
- Sian Barbara Allen as Barbara Hutton
- Buddy Ebsen as Albert 'Al' Pearson
- Herb Edelman as Danny
- David Groh as Dale
- Scott Jacoby as Lee Bassett
- Joe Kapp as Traffic Officer Estevez
- Sue Lyon as Burnsey
- Vera Miles as Erica
- Donna Mills as Laureen
- David Nelson as Traffic Officer Berman
- Harriet Nelson as June Pearson
- George O'Hanlon, Jr. as Pete
- Terry Moore as Trudy
- Bonnie Ebsen as Penny
- Tommy Lee Jones as Traffic Officer Jimmy Hutton

== Reception ==
It was the sixth-most popular prime time television program in the United States in the week of its debut.
