= Harriet Nelson =

American actress (1909-1994)

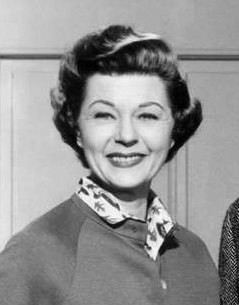
- Nelson in 1964
- Born: Peggy Lou Snyder; July 18, 1909; Des Moines, Iowa, U.S.
- Died: October 2, 1994 (aged 85); Laguna Beach, California, U.S.
- Resting place: Forest Lawn Memorial Park, Hollywood Hills
- Other name: Harriet Hilliard
- Occupations: Actress; singer
- Years active: 1932–1989
- Spouses: Roy Sedley (m. 1930; annul. 1933) Ozzie Nelson (m. 1935; died 1975)
- Children: David Nelson; Ricky Nelson
- Relatives: Kristin Nelson (daughter-in-law); Tracy Nelson (granddaughter); Matthew Nelson (grandson); Gunnar Nelson (grandson); Sam Hilliard Nelson (grandson)

Harriet Nelson (formerly Hilliard; born Peggy Lou Snyder; July 18, 1909 – October 2, 1994) was an American actress. Nelson is best known for her role on the sitcom The Adventures of Ozzie and Harriet.

== Early life and career ==
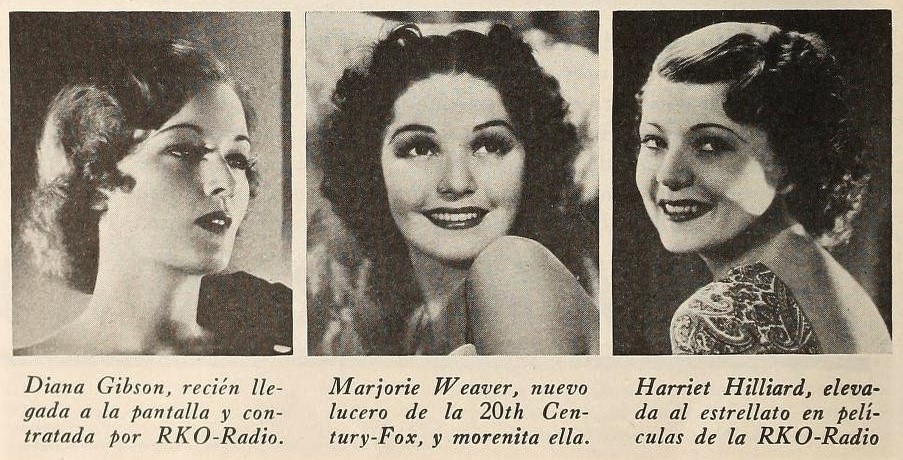
Diana Gibson, Marjorie Weaver, and Hilliard (1937)

Nelson was born Peggy Lou Snyder in Des Moines, Iowa, the daughter of Hazel Dell née McNutt (1888–1971) and Roy Hilliard Snyder (1879–1953). She appeared on the vaudeville stage when she was three years old and made her debut on Broadway in her teens.

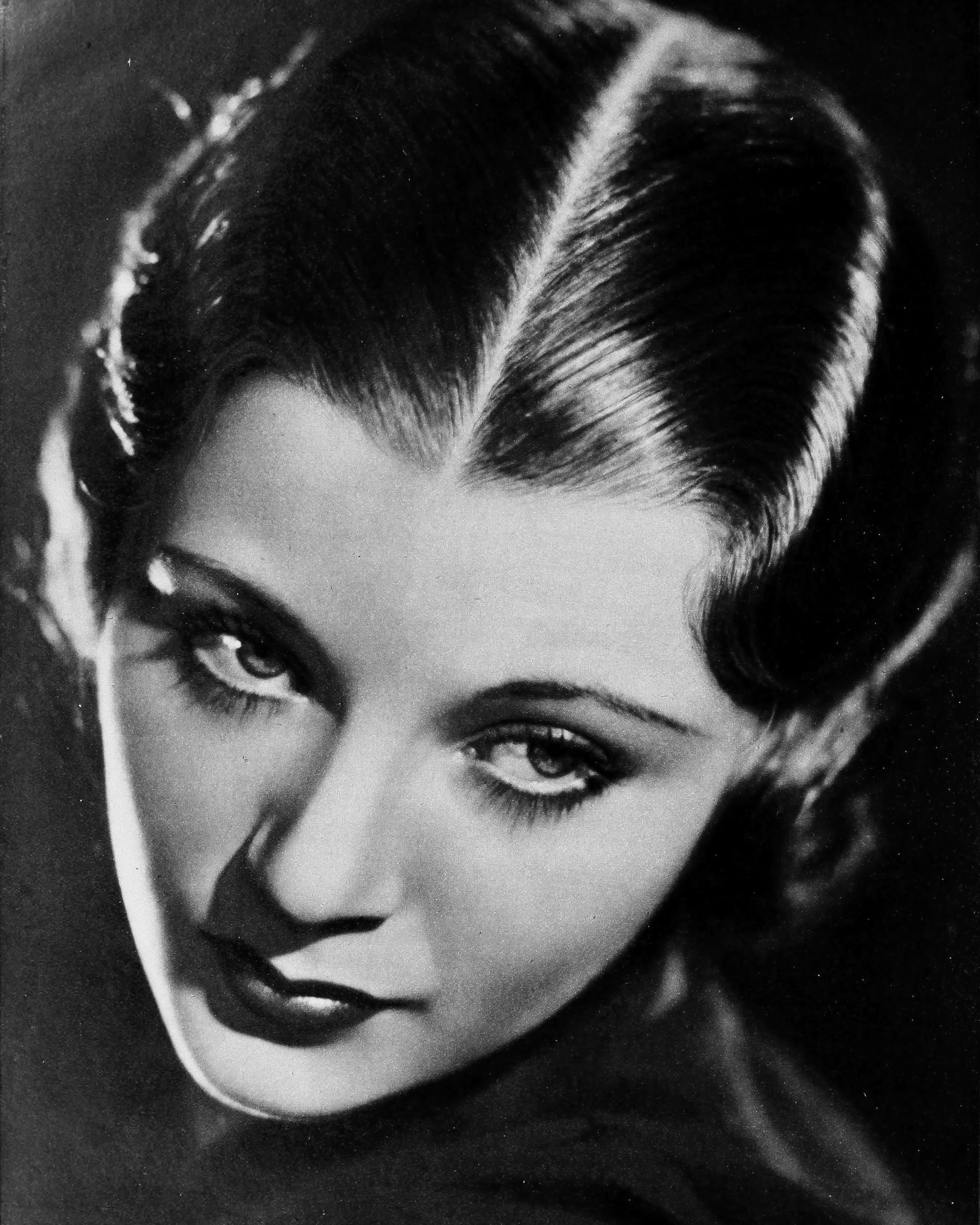
Harriet Hilliard, c. 1936

She frequented the Cotton Club, and began smoking at age thirteen. She wed the comedian, Roy Sedley (1901-1989), in 1930. They were briefly married, but Roy was abusive and lived what has been described as "a high-flying life". They separated a year later, and the marriage was annulled in 1933. She left high school before graduating and joined the Corps de Ballet at the Capitol Theater, later dancing in the Harry Carroll Revue and working as a straight woman for comedians Ken Murray and Bert Lahr. By 1932, she was still performing in vaudeville when she met the saxophone-playing bandleader Ozzie Nelson. Nelson hired her to sing with the band, under the name Harriet Hilliard. They married three years later.

Hilliard had a respectable film career as a solo performer, apart from the band. RKO Radio Pictures signed her to a one-year contract in 1936, and she appeared in three feature films, the most famous being the Fred Astaire-Ginger Rogers musical Follow the Fleet. She was very much in demand during the World War II years for leading roles in escapist musicals, comedies, and mysteries.

In Ozzie Nelson's book, he wrote that Harriet was quite popular during her short time at RKO, and that he and she wanted her to continue her solo film career. However, they decided it was more important for her to continue with the band and subsequent radio show.

Although the couple occasionally appeared together in movies, either as a duo (in Honeymoon Lodge) or as separate characters (in Hi, Good Lookin'!), they are best known for their broadcasting efforts. In 1944, the Nelsons began a domestic-comedy series for radio, The Adventures of Ozzie and Harriet. It was highly popular and made a successful transition to television. It was one of the stalwarts of the ABC-TV schedule from 1952 to 1966. The Nelsons' two sons, Ricky and David, were featured continuously on the show. Peter Jones, director of the television documentary Ozzie and Harriet: The Adventures of America's Favorite Family, has described Harriet Nelson: "She was a bombshell. She liked gay people. She liked a good off-color joke. She enjoyed her cocktails at night. She had the talent to go on and be a big star, but she made that decision to be Ozzie's wife."

In 1973, Ozzie and Harriet also appeared in the sitcom Ozzie's Girls.

In 2009, Harriet was included in Yahoo!'s Top 10 TV Moms from Six Decades of Television for the time period 1952–1966.

== Personal life ==
Harriet (then known as Peggy Lou Snyder) wed the comedian Roy Sedley (1901-1989), in 1930. They were briefly married, but Roy was abusive and lived what has been described as "a high-flying life". They separated a year later, and the marriage was annulled in 1933. In 1935, she married bandleader Ozzie Nelson. They had two sons, David (born in 1936) and Eric (known as Ricky, born in 1940). The couple remained married until Ozzie's death from liver cancer in 1975. Her grandchildren include actress Tracy Nelson and musicians Matthew and Gunnar Nelson. She was also the mother-in-law of Rick's wife Kristin Harmon and David's wife June Blair.

Nelson and her husband were charter members of the Hollywood Republican Committee.

== Later years and death ==
In 1978, Harriet Nelson moved full-time to the Laguna Beach, California, beach home the family had built in 1954. She died of congestive heart failure on October 2, 1994. She is interred with her husband and younger son Ricky (who died in a plane crash in 1985) in the Forest Lawn Memorial Park, Hollywood Hills in Los Angeles.

For her contribution to the television industry, Harriet Nelson has a star on the Hollywood Walk of Fame at 6801 Hollywood Boulevard.

== Filmography ==
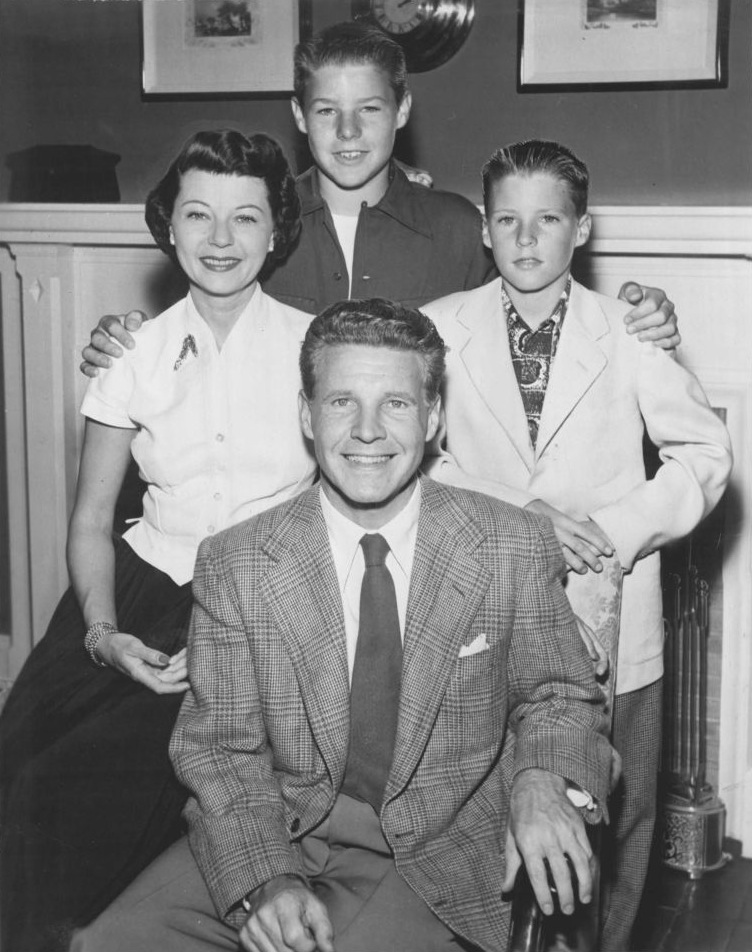
The Nelson family (clockwise from top) David, Ricky, Ozzie and Harriet, 1952

Year	Title	Role	Notes
1932	The Campus Mystery	Wanda Perry	
1936	Follow the Fleet	Connie Martin	
1937	New Faces of 1937	Patricia "Pat" Harrington	
1937	The Life of the Party	Mitzi Martos	
1938	Cocoanut Grove	Linda Rogers	
1941	Sweetheart of the Campus	Harriet Hale	Alternative title: Broadway Ahead
1941	Confessions of Boston Blackie	Diane Parrish	
1942	Canal Zone	Susan Merrill	
1942	Juke Box Jenny	Genevieve Horton	
1943	Hi, Buddy	Gloria Bradley	
1943	The Falcon Strikes Back	Gwynne Gregory	
1943	Gals, Incorporated	Gwen Phillips	Alternative title: Gals, Inc.
1943	Honeymoon Lodge	Lorraine Logan	
1943	Swingtime Johnny	Linda	
1944	Hi, Good Lookin'!	Kelly Clark	
1944	Take It Big	Jerry Clinton	
1952	Here Come the Nelsons	Harriet	Alternative title: Meet the Nelsons
1952-1966	The Adventures of Ozzie and Harriet	Herself	434 episodes
1969-1973	Love, American Style		3 episodes
1972	Night Gallery	Helena Millikan	Episode: "You Can Come Up Now, Mrs. Millikan/Smile, Please"
1973	Ozzie's Girls	Herself	24 episodes
1976	Once an Eagle	Herself	Miniseries
1976	Smash-Up on Interstate 5	June Pearson	Television movie
1977	NBC Special Treat	Elderly shopkeeper	Episode: "Five Finger Discount"
1977	The Love Boat	Henretta McDonald	Episode: "The Identical Problem/Julie's Old Flame/Jinx"
1978	Fantasy Island	Winnie McLaine	Episode: "The Over the Hill Caper/Poof! You're a Movie Star"
1979	Death Car on the Freeway	Mrs. Sheel	Television movie
1979	A Christmas for Boomer		Television movie
1981	Aloha Paradise		Episode: "Best of Friends/Success/Nine Karats"
1981	An Ozzie and Harriet Christmas	Self	TV special on KTLA in Los Angeles
1982	Happy Days	Marge	Episode: "Empty Nest"
1982	The First Time	Charlotte	Television movie
1983	The Kid with the 200 I.Q.	Professor Conklin	Television movie
1987	Time Out for Dad	Mary McLaughlin	Television movie
1989	Father Dowling Mysteries	Sister Agnes	Episode: "The Man Who Came to Dinner Mystery", (final television appearance)
