= List of Father Dowling Mysteries episodes =

This is a list of episodes for the television series Father Dowling Mysteries.

== Series overview ==
All three seasons and the TV-movie have been released on DVD by Paramount Home Video.

Season	Episodes	Originally released		
Season	Episodes	First released	Last released	Network
TV-movie		November 30, 1987		NBC
1	8	January 20, 1989	March 10, 1989	NBC
2	13	January 4, 1990	April 26, 1990	ABC
3	22	September 20, 1990	May 2, 1991	ABC

== TV-movie (1987) ==
Title	Directed by	Written by	Original release date	Rating/share (households)
Fatal Confession	Christopher Hibler	Donald E. Westlake	November 30, 1987	15.5/24
Father Frank Dowling is a priest with a penchant for solving mysteries. He has to solve the mystery of a young man who's obsessed with finding his natural parents: when the man steps out onto the ledge of a building, threatening to jump unless he's told who his parents are, Father Dowling is called to try and talk him down; unfortunately the man falls, and it looks like he may have been murdered.

== Episodes ==
=== Season 1 (1989) ===
No. overall	No. in season	Title	Directed by	Written by	Original release date	US viewers (millions)
1	1	"The Missing Body Mystery: Parts 1 & 2"	Christopher Hibler	Rob Gilmer	January 20, 1989	21.2
2	2	"The Missing Body Mystery: Parts 1 & 2"	Christopher Hibler	Rob Gilmer	January 20, 1989	21.2
A mystery man dies in Father Dowling's confessional. Frank calls the police, but when they arrive the body is gone. Investigating, Frank discovers that the FBI is somehow involved. A two-part mystery.
3	3	"The What Do You Call a Call Girl Mystery"	Charles S. Dubin	Robert Hamilton	January 27, 1989	21.4
A woman of the parish tells her fiancé of her past as a call girl, and is promptly murdered. It's up to Father Frank and Sister Steve to discover whether it was the fiancé, or perhaps a former client, who killed her.
4	4	"The Man Who Came to Dinner Mystery"	Alan Cooke	Diana Kopald Marcus	February 10, 1989	20.8
Sister Steve's ex-boyfriend, Jack, witnesses a murder; but when the cops arrive the victim is alive and well. Jack seeks out Sister Steve for help.
5	5	"The Mafia Priest Mystery: Part 1"	Charles S. Dubin	Robert Hamilton	February 17, 1989	17.2
Father Dowling is caught up in a bizarre mystery when he attempts to prove a fellow priest, a guest at the Rectory, innocent of murder. In the first of a two-part story, he makes the startling discovery that the young priest's family is connected to organized crime.
6	6	"The Mafia Priest Mystery: Part 2"	Charles S. Dubin	Robert Hamilton	February 24, 1989	17.6
Undeterred by appearances, Father Dowling sets out to prove the young priest innocent of murder, discovering he has been framed by a member of his own family. But when the real assassin is himself killed, Frank must rely on a family member who is afraid to tell the truth.
7	7	"The Face in the Mirror Mystery"	Alan Cooke	Robert Hamilton	March 3, 1989	17.8
When the good Father's evil twin brother Blaine (Tom Bosley in a dual role) shows up unexpectedly, Frank suspects right away that Blaine is up to no good. After thwarting his brother's attempted diamond heist, Father Dowling finds himself in hot water when he discovers the police can't tell the two brothers apart.
8	8	"The Pretty Baby Mystery"	Charles S. Dubin	Story by : Susan Woollen; Teleplay by : Robert Hamilton	March 10, 1989	16.9
A distraught woman leaves her baby at the church. Father Frank and Sister Steve track her down, but things don't add up: when they find the woman, she claims she never had a baby.

=== Season 2 (1990) ===
No. overall	No. in season	Title	Directed by	Written by	Original release date	US viewers (millions)
9	1	"The Visiting Priest Mystery"	Christopher Hibler	David Hoffman & Leslie Daryl Zerg	January 4, 1990	18.5
Father Dowling and Sister Steve are taken in by a fake priest. "Father" Damon is actually a hit man, apparently sent to kill aging mob boss Victor Malko. Father Dowling tries to warn Malko, but he won't take the warning seriously. And in consequence Father Dowling's own life is in jeopardy.
10	2	"The Exotic Dancer Mystery"	Christopher Hibler	Story by : Dean Hargrove and Joyce Burditt; Teleplay by : Robert Schlitt	January 11, 1990	18.1
An exotic dancer confesses to Frank that she saw something she shouldn't have, at the nightclub where she works, then turns up murdered. Sister Steve becomes a card dealer in the nightclub to look for clues.
11	3	"The Sanctuary Mystery"	Christopher Hibler	Story by : Jim McGrath; Teleplay by : Robert Schlitt	January 18, 1990	16.4
Sister Steve's brother Mark witnesses a murder, but the police accuse him of the crime. When Mark tries to finger the real killer — Police Chief Hayton — he may become Hayton's next victim.
12	4	"The Stone Killer Mystery"	Ron Satlof	Story by : Doc Barnett; Teleplay by : Jim McGrath	January 25, 1990	18.0
Someone is shooting everyone who was associated with the Gallagher trial, eight years previously, in which Father Frank was a principal witness. But Frank isn't convinced it's Gallagher.
13	5	"The Woman Scorned Mystery"	Seymour Robbie	Richard DeRoy	February 1, 1990	17.5
Father Frank's crooked twin is at it again. Frank gets involved when the woman his brother Blaine has conned turns up dead.
14	6	"The Ghost of a Chance Mystery"	Charles S. Dubin	Robert Schlitt	February 8, 1990	16.0
A parishioner is being haunted by the ghost of her dead father. Frank, Steve, and even Father Prestwick, get involved in trying to find out who is terrorizing the woman — and why.
15	7	"The Blind Man's Bluff Mystery"	Russ Mayberry	Joyce Burditt	February 15, 1990	18.2
Sister Steve witnesses a bank robbery by a supposedly blind man who she has befriended, and becomes an unwitting accomplice in his scheme to blackmail a prominent parishioner.
16	8	"The Falling Angel Mystery"	James Frawley	Dean Hargrove & Joyce Burdit	February 22, 1990	15.9
A black man visits Father Dowling's church claiming to be an Angel. He says someone is going to be taken before their time, and that it's up to Frank to prevent it. Frank thinks it has to do with a parishioner who owes a favor to a crime boss. James McEachin as Michael Moore.
17	9	"The Perfect Couple Mystery"	Ron Satlof	Doc Barnett	March 8, 1990	17.5
A young couple's marriage is on the rocks when the wife is sure her husband is cheating. When she turns to Frank for help, the husband swears he isn't having an affair, but he can't disclose what he has actually been up to.
18	10	"The Confidence Mystery"	James Frawley	Gerry Conway	March 15, 1990	16.2
A con artist has his eye on a valuable church receptacle that Father Prestwick is taking to Romania; he'll stop at nothing to get his hands on the monstrance, even if he has to permanently inconvenience Prestwick. It's up to Father Dowling and Sister Steve to put a cap on the con.
19	11	"The Solid Gold Headache Mystery"	Charles S. Dubin	Richard DeRoy	March 29, 1990	16.5
Sister Stephanie is entrusted with six million dollars in the will of a deceased parishioner. Everyone, including the man's family, wants the money — and may be willing to do anything to get it.
20	12	"The Legacy Mystery"	Russ Mayberry	Story by : Dean Hargrove & Joyce Burditt; Teleplay by : Gerry Conway	April 4, 1990	14.5
A mysterious thief is methodically stealing the art treasures that once belonged to the wealthy Cabot family, and Father Dowling has an inkling the thief might be the surviving son, Jonathan. The only question is, why would a rich businessman take the risk of stealing the paintings when he could easily afford to buy them outright?
21	13	"The Passionate Painter Mystery"	Seymour Robbie	Doc Barnett and David Hoffman & Leslie Daryl Zerg	April 26, 1990	13.0
The church has hired an eccentric painter to retouch the frescoes. He turns out to be an abusive drunk and Sister Stephanie has no patience or pity for him, as he reminds her too much of her own father. But she and Father Frank must come to his aid when his studio blows up.

=== Season 3 (1990–91) ===
No. overall	No. in season	Title	Directed by	Written by	Original release date	US viewers (millions)
22	1	"The Royal Mystery"	Christopher Hibler	Gerry Conway	September 20, 1990	15.1
Sister Stephanie trades places with her double, Lady Cara (also played by Tracy Nelson), a minor member of the British Royal family, who is visiting Chicago with a trade delegation headed by her uncle Sir Robert (David McCallum), unaware that Cara is the target of a mystery assassin.
23	2	"The Medical Mystery"	James Frawley	Jeri Taylor	September 27, 1990	13.3
While Father Dowling is in the hospital for minor surgery, he becomes convinced that the patient in the next bed has been murdered. While investigating, he uncovers a much bigger secret.
24	3	"The Devil and the Deep Blue Sea Mystery"	Christopher Hibler	Dean Hargrove & Joyce Burditt	October 4, 1990	15.2
When most people look at Harry Deil, they see one of the most powerful men in underworld crime. Father Dowling sees something even more sinister: the Devil. Father Dowling must beat him at his own game in order to save the soul of Sister Steve.
25	4	"The Showgirl Mystery"	Christopher Hibler	James H. Brown & Barbara Esensten	October 18, 1990	14.1
A showy showgirl in a shady nightclub is surprised to discover her late husband's estate consists of nothing but debts. Or is she the victim of a scam to deprive her of a small fortune? The investigation reveals a motley crew of underworld suspects for Father Dowling and Sister Steve. Guest stars: Bill Macy
26	5	"The Movie Mystery"	James Frawley	Story by : Gerry Conway; Teleplay by : William Conway and Gerry Conway	October 25, 1990	14.4
Hollywood is shooting a new TV show at the church, in which a priest and a nun solve crimes. When a series of life-threatening accidents occur, Father Dowling and Sister Steve are enlisted to assist in the investigation.
27	6	"The Undercover Nun Mystery"	James Frawley	Story by : Dean Hargrove & Joyce Burditt; Teleplay by : Joyce Burditt	November 1, 1990	14.2
Sister Steve's return to her convent to celebrate the Mother Superior's silver jubilee should be a time of great joy. But shortly after arriving, she discovers a nun with a gun, who turns out to be an undercover FBI agent. When the agent is found murdered, an innocent man is wrongly arrested for the crime.
28	7	"The Murder Weekend Mystery"	Harry Harris	Gerry Conway	November 8, 1990	15.8
Father Dowling is invited to a murder mystery weekend at the home of a famous mystery writer. His investigative skills are put to the test when their host himself is murdered. Guest stars: David Warner
29	8	"The Reasonable Doubt Mystery"	Robert Scheerer	Story by : Brian Clemens; Teleplay by : Brian Clemens and Gerry Conway	November 15, 1990	15.4
Father Dowling is serving as a juror, but has doubts about the testimony of a witness. Dissatisfied with the questions the District Attorney has failed to ask, Frank sets out to re-investigate the case himself, sending Sister Steve undercover in the witness's business, a New-Age bookstore, to learn what he's hiding.
30	9	"The Vanishing Victim Mystery"	Seymour Robbie	Robert Schlitt	November 29, 1990	15.6
Father Dowling stumbles into a kidnapping plot when he befriends a young woman, the heiress to a large brewing fortune, who promptly disappears. Fearing the worst, Sister Steve signs on as the family's new maid to try to find out what happened to the girl.
31	10	"The Christmas Mystery"	James Frawley	Brian Clemens	December 13, 1990	17.0
Following a murder attempt on a woman who has left her child in the temporary care of Father Dowling, the search for the assassin leads to a department store on Christmas Eve.
32	11	"The Fugitive Priest Mystery"	James Frawley	Michael Reaves	January 3, 1991	16.3
Trouble for Father Dowling when his evil twin brother reappears. Blaine impersonates Frank to frame him for a bank robbery, turning Father Dowling himself into a fugitive. Blaine has the perfect alibi: he's in jail, on a minor charge. The only way for Frank to clear his name is to masquerade as his brother, in order to track down Blaine's underworld associates.
33	12	"The Substitute Sister Mystery"	Charles S. Dubin	Story by : Gerry Conway and Brian Clemens; Teleplay by : Gerry Conway	January 10, 1991	15.4
Father Dowling and Sister Steve are caught up in a battle of the bugs, when warring exterminators clash at the Rectory over franchise rights. The plot is thickened by a fake Nun (with mob connections) who is calling herself "Sister Steve", a real hitman (intent on murdering "Sister Steve"), and a mobster who will do anything (even endanger the real Sister Steve) in order to save his daughter.
34	13	"The Missing Witness Mystery"	Christopher Hibler	Story by : Lincoln Kibbee and Brian Clemens; Teleplay by : Lincoln Kibbee	January 24, 1991	14.9
Sister Steve disguises herself as a call girl to track down a missing witness who can clear the name of a young businessman charged with murder. But was he really framed, or is he actually guilty? Father Dowling is uncertain.
35	14	"The Prodigal Son Mystery"	James Frawley	Story by : Dean Hargrove & Joyce Burditt; Teleplay by : Jack Burditt	January 31, 1991	15.1
A man Father Dowling has never met turns up at the Church, claiming to be his son, but disappears before Dowling can question him. Then his would-be son is charged with murder.
36	15	"The Moving Target Mystery"	Robert Scheerer	Story by : Dean Hargrove & Joyce Burditt and Brian Clemens; Teleplay by : Joyce Burditt	February 7, 1991	14.7
A contract killer has a change of heart when he discovers the intended victim, Father Dowling, is a priest. He warns Frank that someone else is certain to accept the contract. Now it's up to Father Dowling to figure out who wants him dead, and what their interest is in the photos he took at the parish picnic.
37	16	"The Priest Killer Mystery"	David Moessinger	Story by : Gerry Conway and Brian Clemens; Teleplay by : Gerry Conway	February 14, 1991	15.1
When a rooftop sniper almost kills Father Dowling, Sister Steve goes undercover as a cab driver, hoping to flush out the would-be assassin. Guest stars: John Astin
38	17	"The Mummy's Curse Mystery"	James Frawley	Michael Reaves	February 21, 1991	14.4
While visiting the Chicago Museum to take in a new exhibit, Father Dowling and Sister Steve encounter an ancient Egyptian curse. Father Prestwick becomes its next victim when he attempts to uncover the deadly secret of the Pharaoh's burial chamber.
39	18	"The Monkey Business Mystery"	Peter Ellis	Doc Barnett	March 7, 1991	14.4
Father Dowling and Sister Steve go out on a limb when she kidnaps a chimp accused of murdering an animal activist. The "killer" chimp will be put down, unless they can prove it has been framed.
40	19	"The Hardboiled Mystery"	James Frawley	Story by : Robert Schlitt and Michael Reaves; Teleplay by : Michael Reaves	March 28, 1991	13.1
An author who used Father Dowling and Steve as characters in his murder mystery novel (they appear in flashbacks as the hard-boiled characters in the book) dies without completing it. Frank is sure the novel is based on a real crime and contains a clue to its solution. Guest stars: Kevin McCarthy
41	20	"The Malibu Mystery"	Christopher Hibler	Story by : Wayne Berwick; Teleplay by : Wayne Berwick & Gerry Conway	April 4, 1991	14.3
While in Los Angeles for a conference, Father Dowling and Sister Stephanie defend a friend who confesses to a murder they are certain he did not commit.
42	21	"The Consulting Detective Mystery"	Sharron Miller	Story by : Dean Hargrove and Gerry Conway; Teleplay by : Gerry Conway	April 25, 1991	13.0
Father Dowling becomes despondent after he mistakenly implicates an innocent man in a robbery at the parish, but an appearance by his hero, Sherlock Holmes, helps him solve the mystery.
43	22	"The Joyful Noise Mystery"	Bob Bralver	Story by : Dean Hargrove & Joyce Burditt; Teleplay by : Joyce Burditt	May 2, 1991	11.5
The local District Attorney's office is home to bullets and ballots as deadly rivals battle for power. One man is already dead and an innocent boy has been charged with murder. Father Dowling tries to expose the real killer before a political rally becomes a blood bath. Guest stars: Bruce A. Young
