= Robert Sampson (actor) =

American actor (1933–2020)

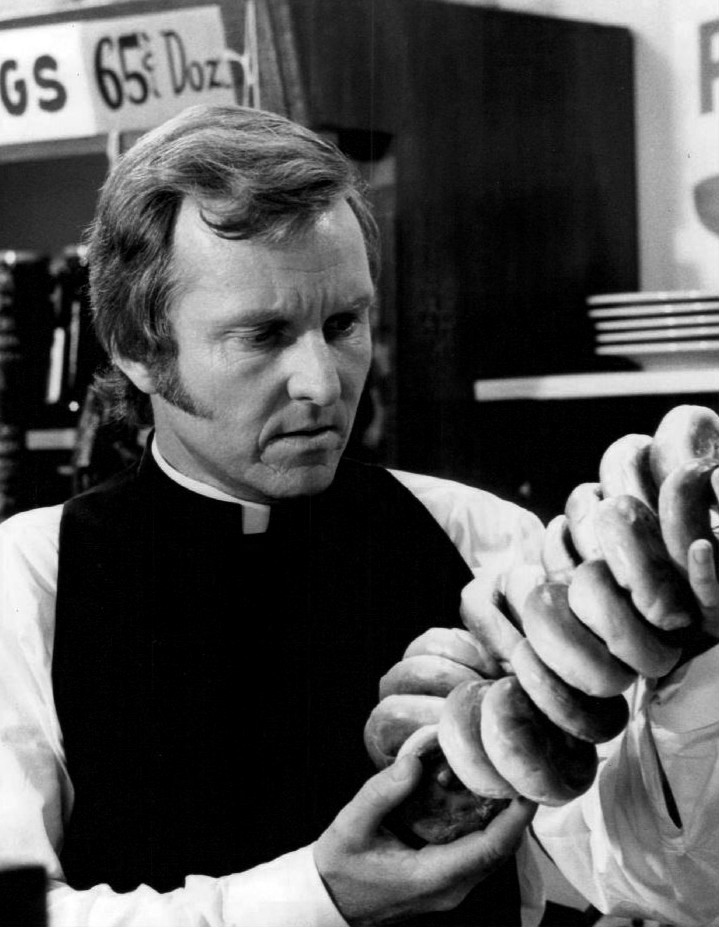
- Sampson in Bridget Loves Bernie (1972)
- Born: Robert LeRoy Sampson; May 10, 1933; Los Angeles, California, U.S.
- Died: January 18, 2020 (aged 86); Santa Barbara, California, U.S.
- Resting place: Oakwood Memorial Park Cemetery
- Occupation: Actor
- Years active: 1954–2020
- Spouse: Maryanne Gackle (m. 1972; div. 1976)
- Children: 1

Robert LeRoy Sampson (May 10, 1933 – January 18, 2020) was an American actor. He was known for playing the role of Father Mike Fitzgerald in the American sitcom television series Bridget Loves Bernie.

== Life and career ==
Sampson was born in Los Angeles, California, the son of Roy Sampson. He began his screen career in 1954, appearing in the television series Meet Corliss Archer. Sampson also guest-starred in numerous television programs including Gunsmoke, The Outer Limits, Ripcord, Star Trek: The Original Series, Mission: Impossible, Bonanza, Dr. Kildare, Wonder Woman, Voyage to the Bottom of the Sea, Green Acres, Hawkins, The Jeffersons and Police Story. He also appeared in films such as Re-Animator (as Dean Halsey), City of the Living Dead, Mr. Ricco, The Dark Side of the Moon, Robot Jox, The Sky's the Limit, Look in Any Window and Mad Dog Coll.

Later in his career, Sampson had a leading role in the film The Restless Ones. He also co-starred in the CBS television series Bridget Loves Bernie, playing the role of Bridget Steinberg's brother Father Mike Fitzgerald. Sampson also played the recurring role of Sheriff Turk Tobias in the television soap opera Falcon Crest.

== Death ==
Sampson died in January 2020 in Santa Barbara, California, at the age of 86 and was interred at Oakwood Memorial Park Cemetery.

== Television ==
Year	Title	Role	Notes
1960	The Life and Legend of Wyatt Earp	Cully Dray	Season 6 Episode 9: "He's My Brother"
1961	Alfred Hitchcock Presents	Jack	Season 6 Episode 14: "The Changing Heart"
1961	Alfred Hitchcock Presents	Ralph Birdwell	Season 6 Episode 16: "A Crime for Mothers"
1961	Rawhide	Lieutenant Meadows	Season 3 Episode 27: "Incident Before Black Pass"
1963	The Alfred Hitchcock Hour	Sergeant Duncan	Season 1 Episode 30: "Dear Uncle George"
1975	The Secret of the Pond	Joe Moncrief	The Wonderful World of Disney
