= Honeymoon Lodge =

1943 film

- Directed by: Edward C. Lilley
- Screenplay by: Clyde Bruckman
- Story by: Warren Wilson
- Produced by: Warren Wilson
- Cinematography: Paul Ivano
- Edited by: Russell F. Schoengarth
- Music by: Frank Skinner (uncredited)
- Production company: Universal Pictures
- Release date: July 23, 1943
- Running time: 63 minutes
- Country: USA
- Language: English

Honeymoon Lodge, also known as Second Honeymoon, is a 1943 American musical comedy film directed by Edward C. Lilley for Universal Pictures and starring David Bruce, Harriet Hilliard, June Vincent, and Rod Cameron.

== Cast ==
- David Bruce as Horace Crump / Bob Sterling
- Harriet Hilliard as Lorraine Logan / Jenny Hockadayl
- June Vincent as Carol Sterling Crump
- Rod Cameron as Big Boy Carson
- Franklin Pangborn as Cathcart
- Andrew Tombes as Judge Wilkins
- Martin Ashe as George Thomas
- Ozzie Nelson as himself, the Band Leader
- Veloz and Yolanda as dancers
- Tip, Tap and Toe as the Speciality Act
- Bobby Brooks as himself
- Hattie Noel as herself ...
- Ray Eberle as himself, the Band Singer
- Joseph Crehan as the Judge
