= Ozzie's Girls =

American television sitcom (1973–74)

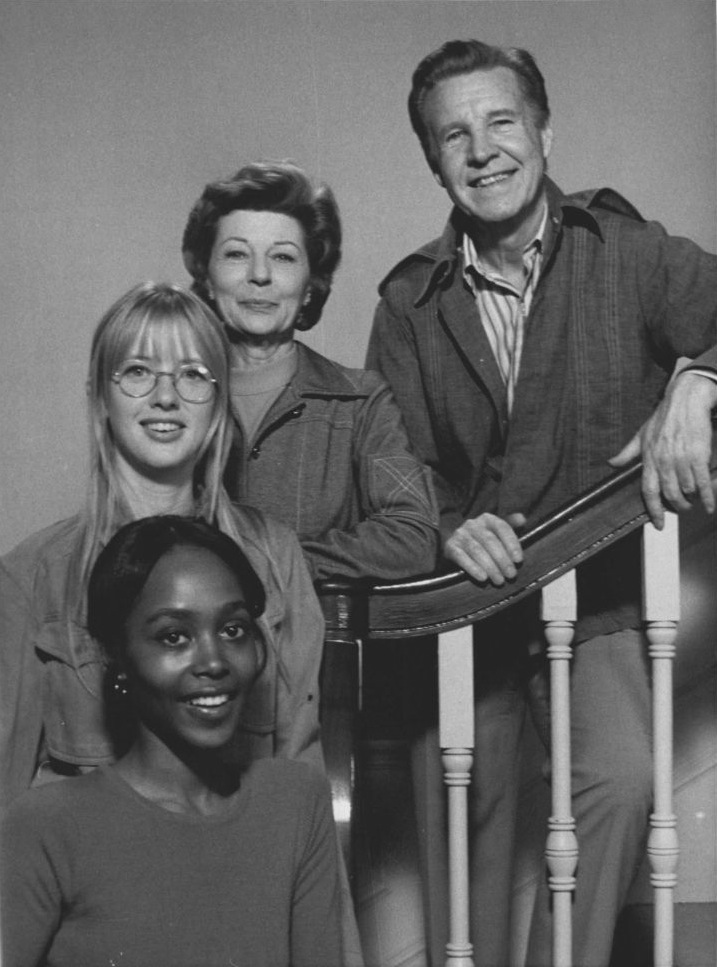
- The cast of Ozzie's Girls, 1972
- Genre: Sitcom
- Written by: Ozzie Nelson
- Directed by: David Nelson; Ozzie Nelson
- Starring: Ozzie Nelson; Harriet Nelson; Brenda Sykes; Susan Sennett
- Country of origin: United States
- Original language: English
- No. of seasons: 1
- No. of episodes: 24

Production
- Executive producers: Ozzie Nelson; Al Simon
- Producer: David Nelson
- Camera setup: Multi-camera
- Running time: 22–24 minutes
- Production company: Filmways Productions

Original release
- Network: NBC
- Release: September 10, 1972
- Network: Syndication
- Release: September 15, 1973 – September 1, 1974

Related
- The Adventures of Ozzie and Harriet

Ozzie's Girls is an American sitcom starring Ozzie and Harriet Nelson that was broadcast in first-run syndication from September 1973 to September 1974. It served as a continuation and revival of The Adventures of Ozzie and Harriet, which aired on radio and television from 1944 to 1966. The pilot episode, written by Ozzie Nelson and directed by David Nelson, aired as a "special presentation" on NBC on September 10, 1972. After NBC passed on the series, it was sold into first-run syndication where it aired as a weekly series during the 1973–74 season.

== Overview ==
Like The Adventures of Ozzie and Harriet, the premise of Ozzie’s Girls mirrored some aspects of the Nelsons’ real lives. Ozzie’s Girls picks up seven years after the cancellation of Ozzie and Harriet. Ozzie and Harriet's sons, David and Ricky, have grown up, moved out and have families of their own. (David served as a series producer, but Ricky, at this point distancing himself from his past and going by the name "Rick Nelson," had no involvement; despite being mentioned frequently, neither David nor Rick appeared on-camera.) In the pilot episode, Ozzie and Harriet discuss how empty and quiet their home is with their boys gone. They then decide to rent their sons' old bedroom to a college student and place an ad in the campus news. The ad is answered by Jennifer McKenzie (Brenda Sykes), a sophisticated, neat and studious college student, who speaks to Harriet over the phone. After Harriet tells Jennifer (who was renamed “Brenda” after the pilot episode) that the room is available, she sets up a time to come to the Nelsons house. While en route to the Nelsons’ home, another student, a free spirited hippy “slob” named Susan “Susie” Hamilton (Susan Sennett), answers the ad in person. After a minor misunderstanding over who answered the ad first, the girls decide to share the room. Despite their differences, the girls become fast friends and are soon considered to be part of the Nelson family by Ozzie and Harriet.

Much like Ozzie and Harriet, episodes of Ozzie’s Girls center around the Nelsons being involved in lives and problems of “the kids”. Much of the humor stems from Ozzie and Harriet having to contend with girls' trials and dilemmas in a more liberated era, after having raised two boys in a more conservative era.

A total of 24 half-hour episodes were produced and aired in select markets from September 1973 to September 1974. The series ended after a single season, as Ozzie Nelson began experiencing health issues. He died of liver cancer on June 3, 1975, less than a year after the series ended.
