= Ozzie Nelson =

American actor, band leader, television producer and director (1906–1975)

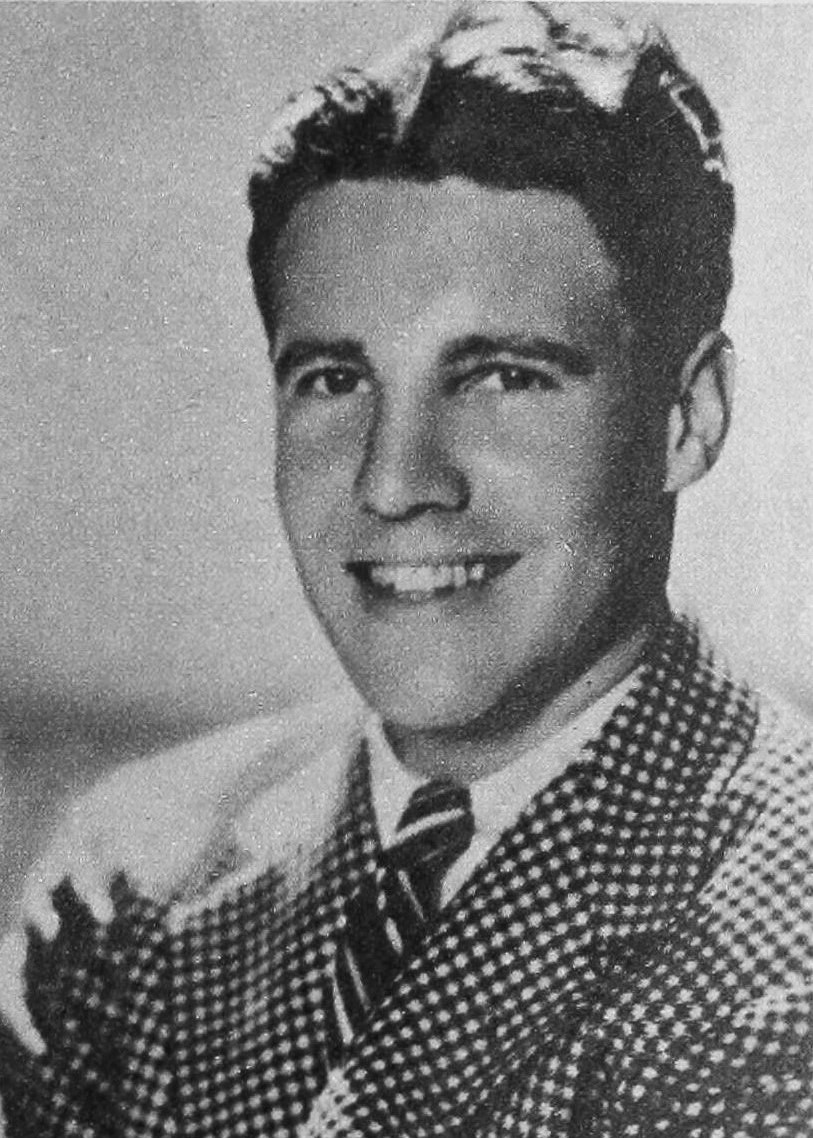
- Nelson in 1937
- Born: Oswald George Nelson; March 20, 1906; Jersey City, New Jersey, U.S.
- Died: June 3, 1975 (aged 69); Los Angeles, California, U.S.
- Resting place: Forest Lawn Memorial Park
- Occupations: Actor; director; producer; screenwriter; musician; composer; conductor; bandleader
- Years active: 1930–1973
- Spouse: Harriet Nelson (m. 1935)
- Children: David Nelson; Ricky Nelson
- Relatives: Don Nelson (brother); Kristin Nelson (daughter-in-law); Tracy Nelson (granddaughter); Matthew Nelson (grandson); Gunnar Nelson (grandson)

Oswald George Nelson (March 20, 1906 – June 3, 1975) was an American actor, filmmaker, musician, and bandleader. He originated and starred in The Adventures of Ozzie and Harriet, a radio and television series with his wife Harriet and two sons David and Ricky Nelson.

== Early life ==
Nelson was born March 20, 1906, in Jersey City, New Jersey, United States. He was the second son of Ethel Irene (née Orr) and George Waldemar Nelson. His paternal grandparents were Swedish and his mother was of English descent. Nelson was raised in Ridgefield Park, where he was active in Scouting, earning the rank of Eagle Scout at age 13. He played football at Ridgefield Park High School and during his college years at Rutgers University. He was a member of the Cap and Skull fraternity. He graduated from Rutgers University with a bachelor's degree and earned a law degree from Rutgers School of Law, Newark, New Jersey, in 1930. Nelson was made a doctor of humane letters by Rutgers University in 1957. As a student, he made pocket money playing saxophone in a band and coaching football. Nelson was rejected to be the vocalist for the Rutgers Jazz Bandits, led by Scrappy Lambert and later Hawley Ades. Nelson was not discouraged and was gracious about this rejection when he met Ades years later. During the Depression, he turned to music as a full-time career.

== Career ==
=== Music ===
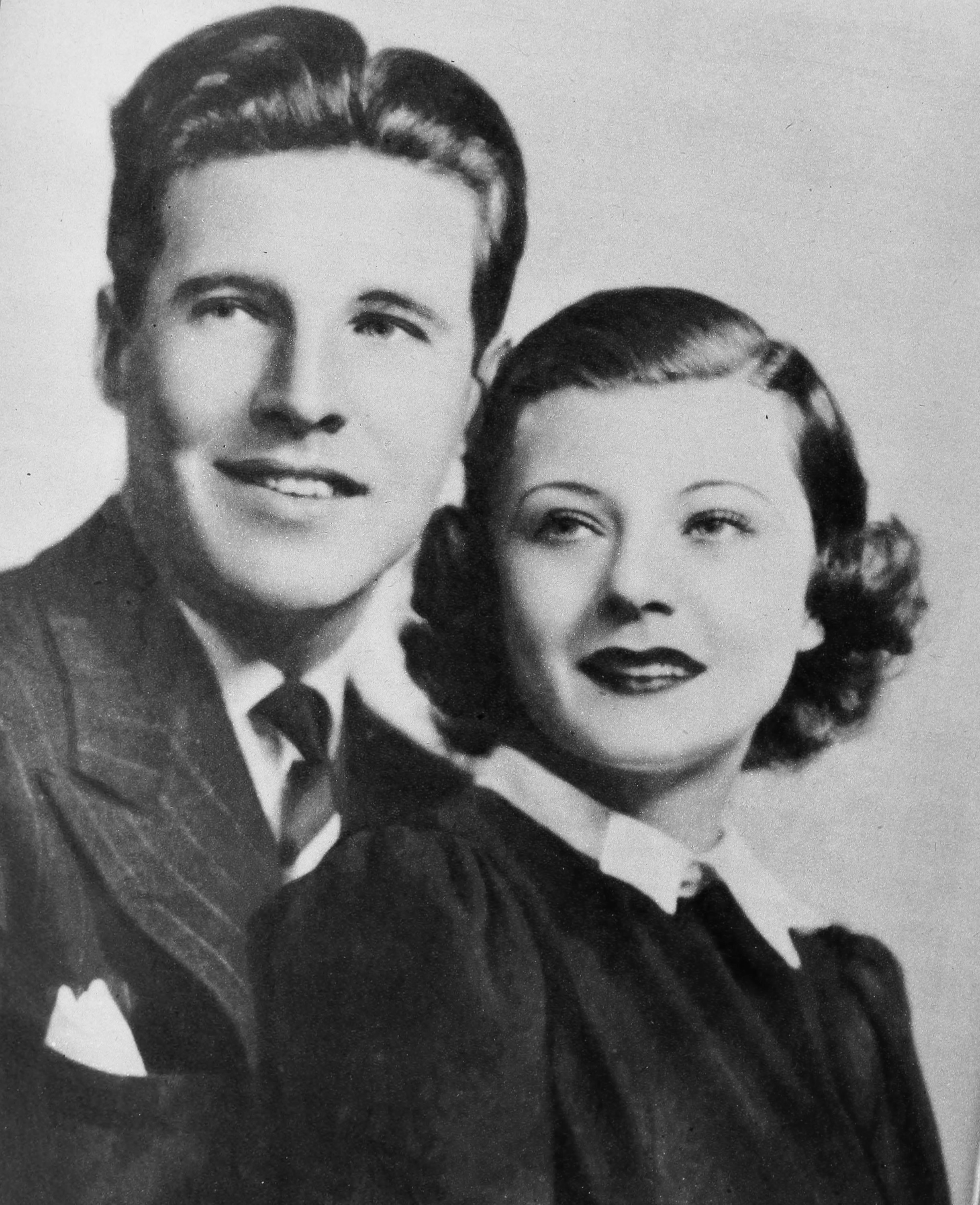
Ozzie and Harriet Nelson in 1936

Nelson started his entertainment career as a band leader. He formed and led the Ozzie Nelson Band, and had some initial limited success. Nelson made his own "big break" in 1930, when The New York Daily Mirror ran a poll of its readers to determine their favorite band. Since he knew that news vendors got credit from the newspaper for unsold copies by returning the front page and discarding the rest of the issue, he cannily had his band's members gather hundreds of discarded newspapers and fill out ballots in their own favor. They edged out Paul Whiteman and were pronounced the winners.

From 1930 through the 1940s, Nelson's band recorded prolifically, first on Brunswick (1930–1933), then Vocalion (1933–1934), then back to Brunswick (1934–1936), Bluebird (1937–1941), Victor (1941), and finally back to Bluebird (1941 through the 1940s). Nelson's records were consistently popular, and in 1934, Nelson enjoyed success with his hit song, "Over Somebody Else's Shoulder", which he introduced. Nelson's primary vocalist was Rose Anne Stevens, who appeared in the 1942 movie Down Rio Grande Way and Tomorrow We Live. Later in his big-band career, Harriet Hilliard replaced Stevens, after the latter's marriage to Colonel Weller. Nelson's calm, easy vocal style was popular on records and radio and quite similar to son Rick's voice, and Harriet's perky vocals added to the band's popularity.

In 1935, Ozzie Nelson and His Orchestra, as they were being called, had a hit with "And Then Some", which was number one for one week on the U.S. pop singles chart. Nelson wrote and composed several songs, including "Wave the Stick Blues", "Subway", "Jersey Jive", "Swingin' on the Golden Gate", and "Central Avenue Shuffle".

In October 1935, he married the band's vocalist Harriet Hilliard. The couple had two children; the older, David (1936–2011), became an actor and director, and the younger, Ricky (1940–1985), became an actor and singer.

=== Films ===
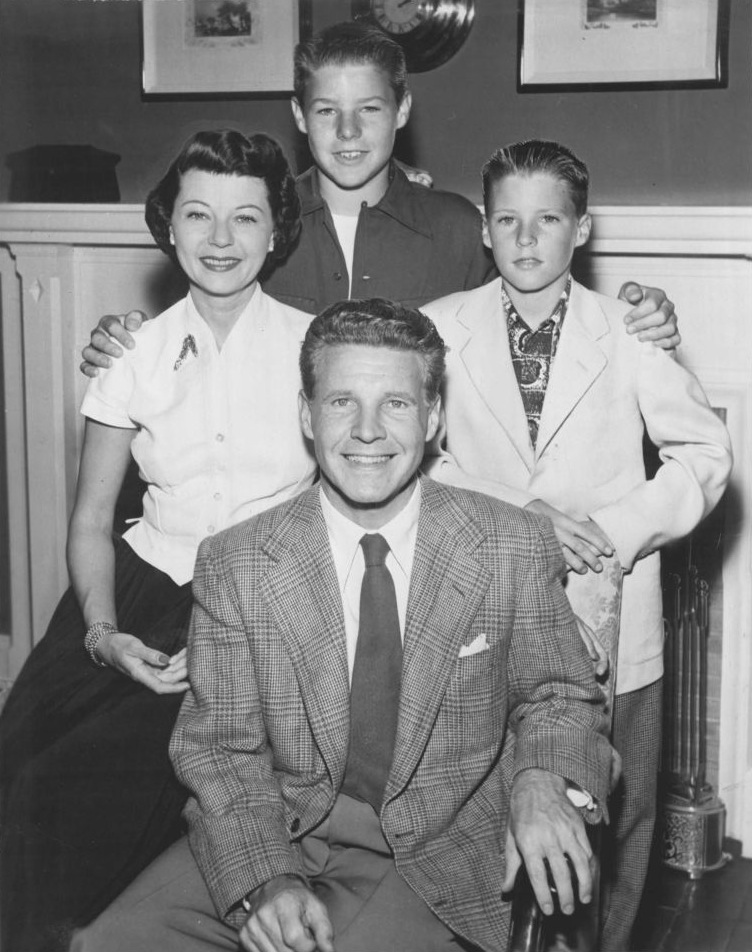
The Nelson family (clockwise from top): David, Ricky, Ozzie, and Harriet, 1952

Ozzie Nelson appeared with his band in feature films and short subjects of the 1940s, and often played speaking parts, displaying a tongue-in-cheek sense of humor, as in the 1942 musical Strictly in the Groove. He shrewdly promoted the band by agreeing to appear in "soundies", three-minute musical movies shown in "film jukeboxes" of the 1940s. In 1952, when his family and he were established as radio and TV favorites, they starred in a feature film, Here Come the Nelsons, which served as the "pilot" for the TV series.

=== Radio and television ===
In the 1940s, Nelson began to look for a way to spend more time with his family, especially his growing sons. Besides band appearances, Harriet and he had been regulars on The Raleigh Cigarette Program, Red Skelton's radio show. Nelson developed and produced his own radio series, The Adventures of Ozzie and Harriet. The show originally aired in 1944, with their sons played by actors until 1949. In 1952, it moved to television, where David and Ricky appeared on camera. The radio version continued for another two years, and the last television episode aired in 1966.

The TV show starred the entire family, as America watched Ozzie and Harriet raise their boys. Nelson was producer and director of most of the episodes, and he co-wrote many of them. Nelson's brother, Don, was also one of the writers. Ozzie was hands-on, involved with every aspect of both radio and TV programs. Throughout the 1950s, notably, Ozzie's prior bandleading career and Harriet's singing, acting, and dancing careers were seldom mentioned. The younger audience would have had no idea that Ozzie and Harriet had previously been involved in music.

Nelson appeared as a guest panelist on the June 9, 1957, episode of What's My Line?

His last television show, in the fall of 1973, was Ozzie's Girls, which lasted for a year in first-run syndication. The premise involved Ozzie and Harriet renting their sons' former room to two college girls—actresses Brenda Sykes and Susan Sennett—and portrayed the Nelsons' efforts at adjusting to living with two young women after raising two sons.

For his contribution to the television industry, Ozzie Nelson has a star on the Hollywood Walk of Fame at 6555 Hollywood Boulevard. He has an additional star with his wife at 6260 Hollywood Boulevard for their contribution to radio.

== Personal life ==
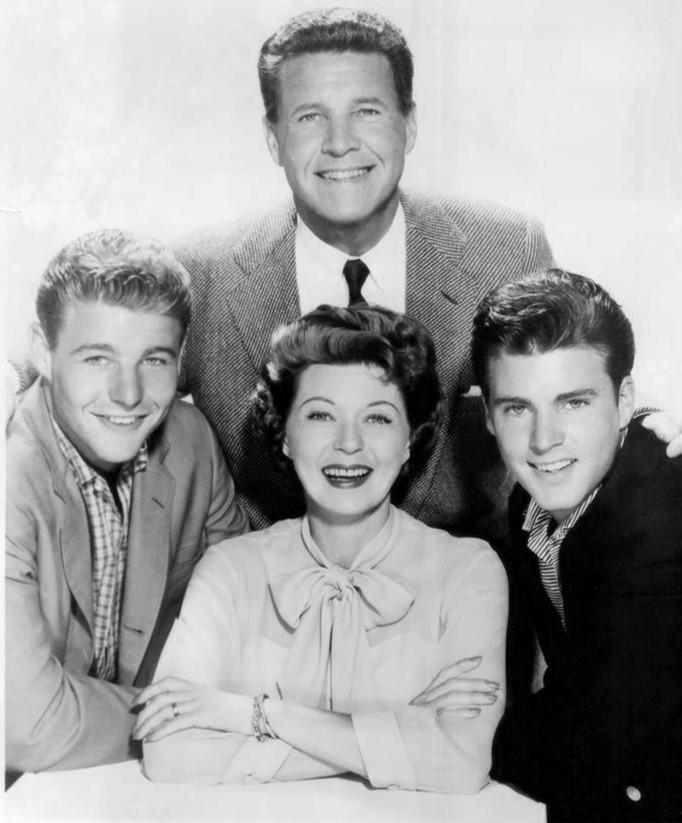
The Nelsons in 1960

Nelson met singer Harriet Hilliard in 1932. She became his band's vocalist, and they married on October 8, 1935. They had two sons, David (1936–2011), who became an actor and director, and Eric (known as Ricky, 1940–1985) a popular singer with 18 top 10 hits. The couple remained married until Ozzie's death in 1975. His grandchildren include actress Tracy Nelson and musicians Matthew and Gunnar Nelson. He was also the former father-in-law of Kristin Harmon and June Blair.

Cultural historians have noted that the on-screen laid-back character was very different from the real-life Ozzie Nelson, who has been characterized as an authoritarian figure who monitored every aspect of his children's lives. In 1998, A&E broadcast a documentary entitled Ozzie and Harriet: The Adventures of America's Favorite Family, which depicted Ozzie Nelson as a dictatorial personality who "thwarted his sons, preventing them from attending college and reminding them that they were obliged to work on television". David Halberstam, author of "The Fifties” (Villard) said "the Nelsons arguably were a dysfunctional family. In real life, Ozzie was a workaholic who stole his sons’ childhood (by having them grow up in show business)... Then later, Ozzie co-opted Ricky’s rock ‘n’ roll music... the theft of Ricky’s childhood and the co-opting of his rock music led to ... drug problems and a shattered marriage".

David and Ricky were not initially part of the Nelsons' radio program and their roles were played by professional actors. After Bing Crosby's son appeared on Bing's program, David and Ricky requested that they also be allowed to play themselves on the program, and Ozzie agreed to that. While they acted in The Adventures of Ozzie and Harriet for all of its 14 seasons, Ozzie fully supported their other interests. David flunked out of college in his first year and Ricky chose not to attend college so that he could focus on his singing career; neither of which pleased Ozzie who had attended Rutgers and earned a law degree. Ozzie supported the boys acting in movies - The Big Circus and Rio Bravo - and allowed David to pursue his behind-the-camera interest by directing episodes of The Adventures of Ozzie and Harriet. Ozzie allowed Ricky to perform on the show, make the record "I'm Walkin'", and supported the addition of rock music to the show despite his personal belief that Ricky should focus more on ballads. He used his law knowledge to negotiate Ricky's music contract and he wrote a show highlighting the trapeze skills that David had learned for The Big Circus. The money that David and Ricky earned from the show included both salary and stock in sponsor companies, and all of that was held in trusts and given to them at age 21 and 30. Ozzie ensured that rights to the show remained with the Nelson family so that his sons and their children would benefit.

Nelson and his wife were charter members of the Hollywood Republican Committee.

In 1973, Ozzie Nelson published his autobiography, Ozzie (Prentice Hall, 1973, ISBN 0-13-647768-2).

== Death ==
Nelson suffered from recurring malignant tumors in his later years, and eventually succumbed to liver cancer. He died at his home in the San Fernando Valley on June 3, 1975, with his wife and sons at his bedside.

Services were held at the Church of the Hills at Forest Lawn, Hollywood Hills, California, on Friday, June 6. He is interred with his wife and son Ricky in the Forest Lawn – Hollywood Hills Cemetery in Los Angeles, California.

When his elder son David died in 2011, he was cremated, having chosen a niche in Westwood Memorial Park's outdoor Garden of Serenity columbarium in Los Angeles, rather than interment in the Nelson family plot.

== Selected filmography ==
Year	Title	Role	Notes
1941	Sweetheart of the Campus	Himself	
1942	Strictly in the Groove	Himself	
1943	Honeymoon Lodge	Ozzie Nelson, Band Leader	Credited as Ozzie Nelson and His Orchestra
1944	Wave-a-Stick Blues	Himself	
1946	People Are Funny	Ken	
1952	Here Come the Nelsons	Himself	
1952–1966	The Adventures of Ozzie and Harriet	Himself	435 episodes Director, producer, writer
1956	The Jane Wyman Show	Dr. Phil Dunning	Episode: "Shoot the Moon"
1958	The Bob Cummings Show	Himself	Episode: " Bob Becomes a Stage Uncle"
1965	Love and Kisses	–	Screenwriter, producer
1968	The Impossible Years	Dr. Herbert J. Fleischer	
1968	The Mothers-in-Law	Ossie Snick/Owen Sinclair/Ossie Snick	Episode: "Didn't You Use to Be Ozzie Snick?"
1971	Adam-12	Ted Clover	Episode: "The Grandmothers"
1972	Night Gallery	Henry Millikan	Episode: "You Can Come Up Now, Mrs. Millikan/Smile, Please"
1973	Ozzie's Girls	Himself	24 episodes Producer, director
1973	Love, American Style	Dan	Segment: "Love and the Unmarriage"
1973	Bridget Loves Bernie	–	Director, 3 episodes
