= Last Plane Out =

- Video sleeve.
- Directed by: David Nelson
- Written by: Ernest Tidyman
- Produced by: Jack Cox; David Nelson
- Starring: Jan-Michael Vincent; Julie Carmen; David Huffman
- Cinematography: Jacques Haitkin
- Music by: Dennis McCarthy
- Distributed by: New World Pictures
- Release date: 23 September 1983
- Running time: 92 minutes
- Country: United States
- Language: English
- Box office: $115,475 (US)

Last Plane Out is a 1983 action thriller film, directed by David Nelson. It is based on the experience of journalist Jack Cox (who co-produced the film) in Nicaragua when it was ruled by Anastasio Somoza Debayle and his battle against insurgents during the 1979 Nicaraguan Revolution.

== Plot ==
American journalist Jack Cox covers the Nicaraguan Revolution and falls in love with a Sandinista rebel.

== Principal cast ==
- Jan-Michael Vincent as Jack Cox
- Julie Carmen as Maria Cardena
- Mary Crosby as Elizabeth Rush
- David Huffman as Jim Conley
- Lloyd Battista as Anastasio Somoza Debayle
- Tonyo Meléndez as Ernesto
- Ronnie Gonzalez as Luis
- Anthony Feijoo as Ramon
