= Tracy Nelson (actress) =

American actress

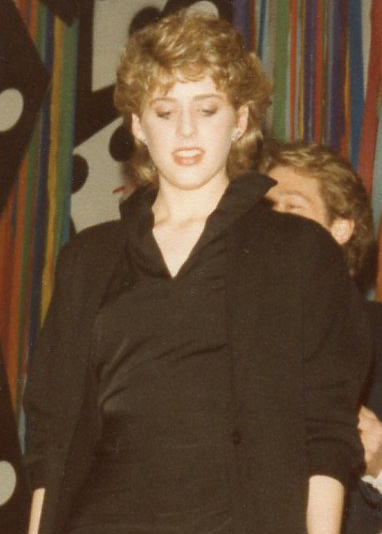
- Nelson in 1981
- Born: Tracy Kristine Nelson; October 25, 1963 (age 63); Santa Monica, California, U.S.
- Education: Bard College
- Occupations: Actress, dancer, writer
- Years active: 1968–present
- Spouse: William R. Moses (m. 1987; div. 1997)
- Partner: Chris Clark (2001–2002)
- Children: 2
- Parents: Ricky Nelson (father); Kristin Nelson (mother)
- Relatives: Gunnar Nelson (brother); Matthew Nelson (brother); Tom Harmon (maternal grandfather); Elyse Knox (maternal grandmother); Kelly Harmon (aunt); Mark Harmon (uncle); Pam Dawber (aunt); Harriet Hilliard Nelson (paternal grandmother); Ozzie Nelson (paternal grandfather); David Nelson (uncle)

Tracy Kristine Nelson (born October 25, 1963) is an American actress. From a long line of entertainers, she is the daughter of musician Ricky Nelson and actress and painter Kristin Nelson.

== Early life, family and education ==
Tracy Nelson was born in Santa Monica, California, to musician and film actor Ricky Nelson and actress/artist Kristin Nelson (née Harmon). Tracy has three younger siblings: Matthew Nelson and Gunnar Nelson of the 1990s rock group Nelson, and Sam Nelson.

Tracy is a fourth-generation performer. Her great-grandparents were vaudeville performers Hazel Dell (née McNutt) and Roy Hilliard Snyder. Their daughter was her paternal grandmother Harriet Nelson, the star of the ABC-TV sitcom The Adventures of Ozzie and Harriet from 1952 to 1966. Her paternal grandparents were Ozzie and Harriet Hilliard Nelson. Nelson's maternal grandparents were football star Tom Harmon, a Heisman Trophy winner from the University of Michigan, and actress Elyse Knox. She is also the niece of actors David Nelson, and her mother's siblings Mark Harmon and Kelly Harmon.

Nelson studied ballet for 17 years with Tania Lachine. She studied theater with Kim Stanley and Nina Foch and briefly in the UK.

She attended The Buckley School and graduated in 1981 from the Westlake School for Girls (now Harvard-Westlake School) in Los Angeles. She studied Dance and European History at Bard College in upstate New York.

== Career ==
At age 4, Nelson played one of Henry Fonda and Lucille Ball's daughters in Yours, Mine and Ours (1968). Her future co-star Tom Bosley also appeared in that film.

She has been a professional dancer and toured throughout California in a dance company while still in grammar school. She performed in The Edinburgh Fringe Festival after graduation from high school. In 1982, she played "valley girl" Jennifer DeNuccio on the television series Square Pegs, and in 1986 she landed the role of the anorexic daughter in Paul Mazursky's film Down and Out in Beverly Hills.

Throughout the 1980s and 1990s, Nelson made guest appearances on television series including Family Ties, St. Elsewhere, Murphy Brown, The Nanny, 7th Heaven, Melrose Place, Will & Grace, Matlock, Diagnosis Murder, and Seinfeld, where she was well known as the girl dating George who happened to "look" like Jerry. Nelson co-starred in the television series The Father Dowling Mysteries as Sister Stephanie for its three seasons. She was also a series regular on Aaron Spelling's drama Glitter, the sitcom A League of Their Own, and the Australian television series The Man from Snowy River. She was in the touring company and on Broadway as Rizzo in Grease in 1995. Nelson has appeared in several theatrical releases and over 20 television movies, including The Perfect Nanny in 2000, The Perfect Husband, Kate's Secret, The Fight for Jesse, and The Rival in 2006.

She has written a book about her personal experience and a movie script about her family, The Nelsons.

== Personal life ==
Nelson has survived three kinds of cancer. She was diagnosed with stage 2 Hodgkin's lymphoma a month after her 1987 marriage to Moses, and one year after her father was killed in an aircraft crash on New Year's Eve 1985 in a field in DeKalb, Texas. Nelson went into remission after surgery, chemotherapy (ABVD) and radiation at Cedars-Sinai Hospital in Los Angeles.

Nelson was later diagnosed with thyroid cancer in 2005, and then breast cancer in 2010. She fully recovered from a bilateral mastectomy and complete reconstruction.

Nelson is active in cancer research advocacy and was the spokesperson for The Lymphoma Research Foundation of America. She received the "Lifesaver Award" from that organization and the "Jill Ireland Award" from the Amie Karen Cancer Fund for Children.

== Filmography ==
Film
| Year | Title | Role | Notes |
|---|---|---|---|
| 1968 | Yours, Mine and Ours | Germaine Beardsley | Directed by Melville Shavelson |
| 1984 | Maria's Lovers | Joanie | Directed by Andrei Konchalovsky |
| 1986 | Down and Out in Beverly Hills | Jenny Whiteman | Directed by Paul Mazursky |
| 1998 | The Night Caller | Beth Needham | Directed by Robert Malenfant |
| 2000 | The Perfect Tenant | Rachel | Directed by Doug Campbell |
| 2000 | The Perfect Nanny | Andrea McBride/Nikki Harcourt | Directed by Robert Malenfant |
| 2000 | Home – The Horror Story | Linda Parkinson | Directed by Temístocles López |
| 2001 | Dumb Luck | Kelly Jordan | Directed by Craig Clyde |
| 2002 | Fangs | Ally Parks | Directed by Kelly Sandefur |
| 2005 | Miracle at Sage Creek | Adrianne | Directed by James Intveld |
| 2009 | The Telemarketers: 36 Hrs | Taylor | Directed by Lonny Stevens |
| 2013 | My Stepbrother Is a Vampire!?! | Denise | Directed by David DeCoteau |
| 2016 | Emma's Chance | Principal Matheson | Directed by Anna Elizabeth James |
| 2016 | Arlo: The Burping Pig | Mrs. Pritchett | Directed by Tom DeNucci |
| 2016 | The Last Note | Sis | Directed by Robert Zameroski |
| 2018 | As Long as I'm Famous | Theda Bara | Directed by Bruce Reisman |
Television
| Year | Title | Role | Notes |
| 1982–1983 | Square Pegs | Jennifer DiNuccio | Main role (20 episodes) |
| 1983 | Hotel | Isabel Darby | Episode: "Blackout" |
| 1984 | St. Elsewhere | Jennifer Milbourne | Episode 19: "The Woman" |
| 1984–1985 | Family Ties | Deena Marx | 2 episodes |
| 1984–1985 | Glitter | Angela Timini | Main role 14 episodes) |
| 1985 | The Love Boat | Sandy | Episode: "Ace Takes the Test / The Counterfeit Couple / The Odd Triple" |
| 1986 | Comedy Factory | Michelle | Episode: "Hearts of Steel" |
| 1986 | CBS Schoolbreak Special | Lori | Episode: "The Drug Knot" |
| 1989–1991 | Father Dowling Mysteries | Sister Stephanie "Steve" Oskowski | Main role (42 episodes) |
| 1993 | A League of Their Own | Evelyn Gardner | Main role (6 episodes) |
| 1994 | Matlock | Jessie Morgan | Episode: "The P.I." |
| 1994 | Burke's Law | Eve Baker | Episode: "Who Killed the Romance" |
| 1994–1995 | Melrose Place | Meredith Parker | 4 episodes |
| 1995 | The Nanny | Mary Ruth | Episode: "The Chatterbox" |
| 1995 | Snowy River: The McGregor Saga | Ruth Whitney | 5 episodes |
| 1996 | Touched by an Angel | Lisa Magdaleno | Episode: "The One That Got Away" |
| 1996 | Diagnosis: Murder | Kristie Lofton | Episode: "Mind Over Murder" |
| 1998 | Seinfeld | Janet | Episode: "The Cartoon" |
| 1998 | Murphy Brown | Lisa | 2 episodes |
| 2000 | 7th Heaven | Pauline | Episode: "Gossip" |
| 2002 | Will & Grace | Alison | Episode: "Wedding Balls" |
| 2003 | Still Standing | Elise Larkin | Episode: "Still the Bad Parents" |
Television film
| Year | Title | Role | Notes |
| 1986 | Pleasures | Annie Benton | ABC movie |
| 1986 | Kate's Secret | Patch Reed | NBC movie |
| 1987 | Home | Susan Costigan | CBS movie |
| 1987 | Tonight's the Night | Jamie Davies | ABC movie |
| 1987 | If It's Tuesday, It Still Must Be Belgium | Randi Wainwright | NBC movie |
| 1987 | Fatal Confession | Sister Stephanie "Steve" Oskowski | Pre-series movie to Father Dowling Mysteries |
| 1992 | Highway Heartbreaker | Annie | CBS movie |
| 1992 | Perry Mason: The Case of the Reckless Romeo | Charley Adams | NBC movie |
| 1993 | No Child of Mine | Tammy | CBS movie |
| 1994 | Ray Alexander: A Taste for Justice | Donna Colla | NBC movie |
| 1995 | Ray Alexander: A Menu for Murder | Donna Colla | NBC Movie |
| 1996 | For Hope | Annie Altman | ABC movie |
| 1997 | Touched By Evil | Clara Devlin | ABC movie |
| 1999 | The Promise | Lisa Miles | NBC movie |
| 2000 | Perfect Game | Diane Crosby | Disney Channel movie |
| 2002 | Killer Bees! | Audrey Harris | Pax TV movie |
| 2004 | Her Perfect Spouse | Lisa Dorian | |
| 2005 | A Killer Upstairs | Sandra Nowlin | |
| 2006 | The Rival | Alice Miller | |
| 2007 | A Grandpa for Christmas | Marie O'Riley | Hallmark Channel movie |
| 2008 | Polar Opposites | Jenna | |
| 2015 | A Fatal Obsession | Christie Ryan | Lifetime Movie Network |
| 2016 | The Wrong Child | Joyce | Lifetime Movie Network |
Short
| Year | Title | Role | Notes |
| 1995 | The Adventures of Mary-Kate & Ashley | Jamie Olsen | 2 episodes |
| 2000 | The Bus Stop | | |
| 2016 | The Eleventh | Cynthia | 5 episodes |
