= David Nelson (actor) =

American actor (1936–2011)

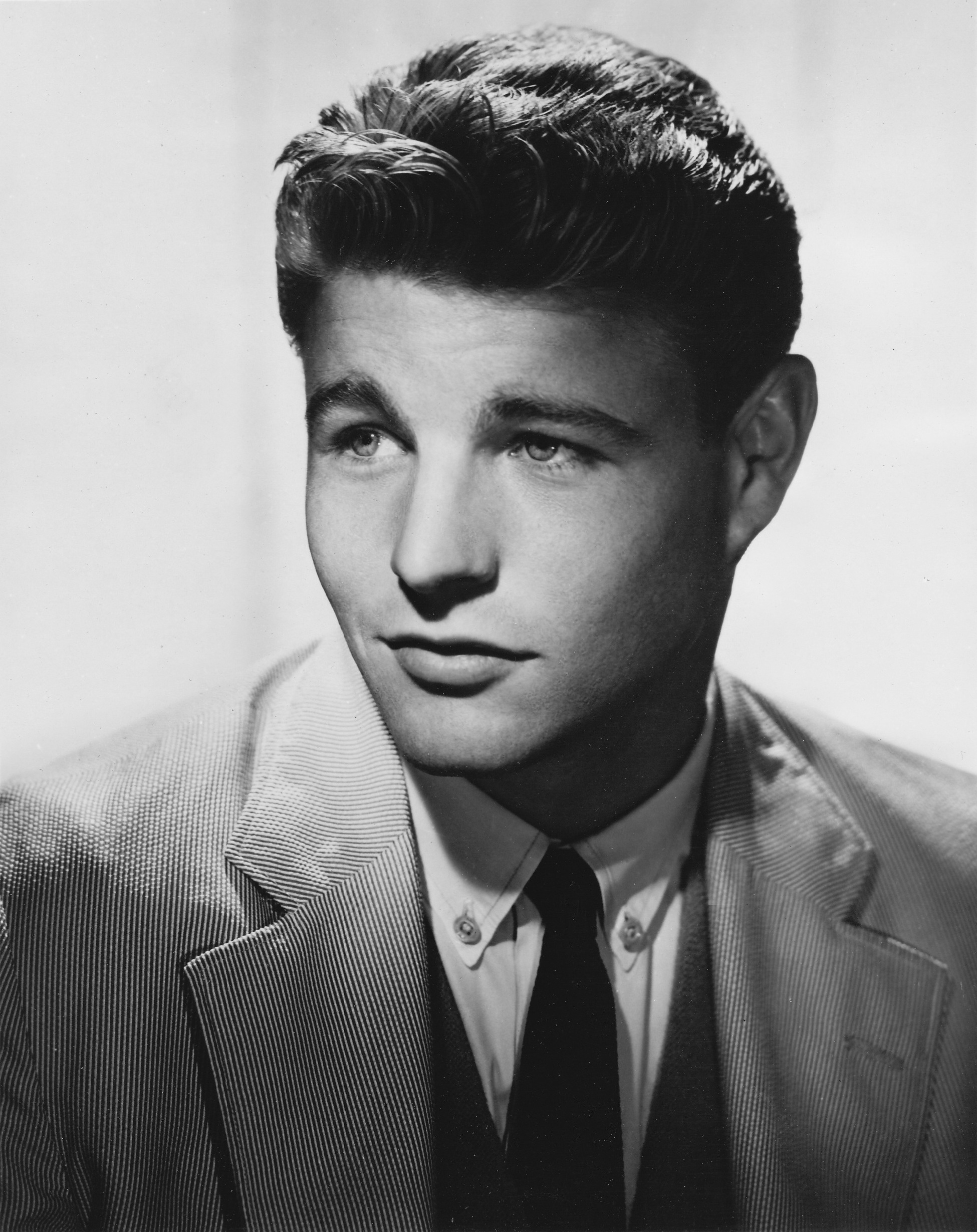
- Nelson, c. 1964
- Born: David Oswald Nelson; October 24, 1936; New York City, U.S.
- Died: January 11, 2011 (aged 74); Century City, California, U.S.
- Resting place: Westwood Memorial Park
- Education: University of Southern California
- Occupation: Actor
- Years active: 1948–1990
- Spouses: June Blair (m. 1961; div. 1975) Yvonne O'Connor Huston (m. 1975)
- Children: 5 (Note: Two biological and three adopted.)
- Parents: Ozzie Nelson; Harriet Nelson
- Relatives: Ricky Nelson (brother); Kristin Nelson (former sister-in-law); Tracy Nelson (niece); Matthew Nelson (nephew); Gunnar Nelson (nephew); Sam Nelson (nephew); Chuck Woolery (former-son-in-law)

David Oswald Nelson (October 24, 1936 – January 11, 2011) was an American actor, producer and director. He was the older brother of musician Ricky Nelson.

== Early life ==
Nelson was born October 24, 1936, in New York City, the elder son of entertainment couple Harriet Hilliard Nelson and Ozzie Nelson. His younger brother was singer Ricky Nelson. In late 1941, Nelson moved with his parents from Tenafly, New Jersey, to Los Angeles, California.

He attended Hollywood High School, balancing his studies, playing on the football team and his TV work. He later attended the University of Southern California and was a member of Kappa Sigma fraternity.

== Career ==
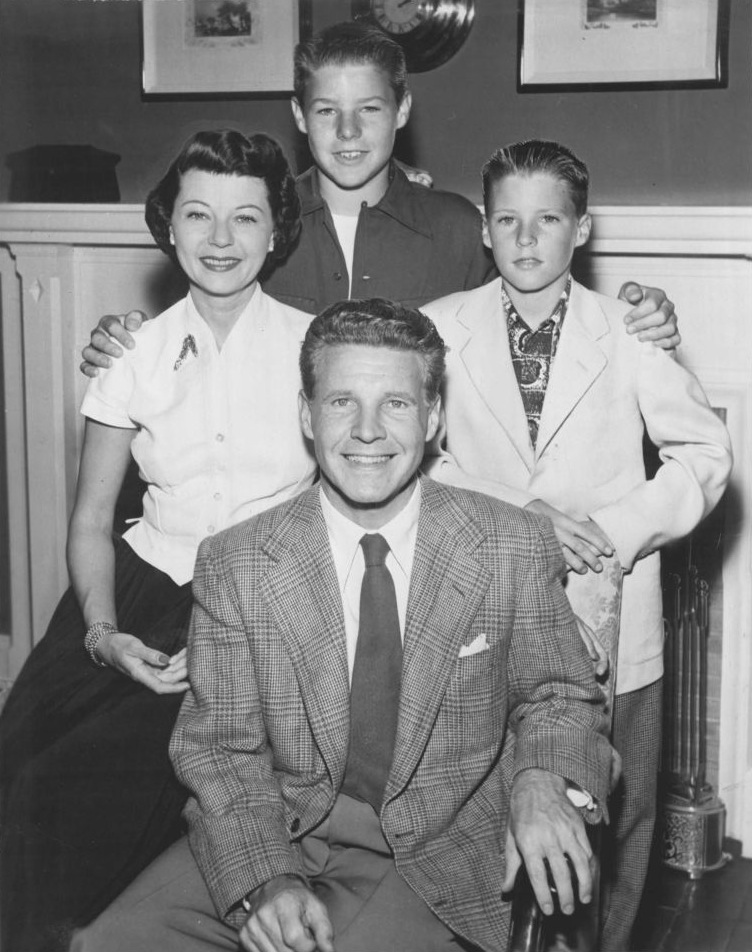
The Nelson family, c. 1952

=== Acting ===
Nelson's acting career started in 1949 when he and his brother began playing themselves on their parents' radio series The Adventures of Ozzie and Harriet, which lasted until 1954. His film debut came in Here Come the Nelsons, released in 1952.

Also in 1952, Nelson continued playing himself on the TV version of The Adventures of Ozzie and Harriet, which ran until 1966. He directed about a dozen episodes of the show starting in the early 1960s.

During the '50s and '60s, Nelson appeared in Peyton Place, The Remarkable Mr. Pennypacker, The Big Circus, Day of the Outlaw, -30-, and The Big Show.

From the 1970s through 1990, Nelson had roles in Smash-Up on Interstate 5, Up In Smoke, The Love Boat, High School U.S.A., and A Family for Joe. Nelson's last film appearance was in the 1990 film Cry-Baby.

=== Directing and producing ===
Nelson directed episodes of The Adventures of Ozzie and Harriet, O.K. Crackerby!, Ozzie's Girls and Goodnight, Beantown. He directed several films, including Childish Things, Death Screams and Last Plane Out.

In 1973 he was the producer of Ozzie's Girls, a spinoff/revival of The Adventures of Ozzie and Harriet.

== Personal life and death ==
Nelson had two sons, Daniel Blair and James Eric, from his first marriage with June Blair, which ended in divorce. He later adopted two sons (John and Eric) and a daughter, Teri, during his second marriage to Yvonne Huston.

Nelson died January 11, 2011, in Century City, California, of complications of colon cancer.

== Filmography ==
=== Actor ===
- Here Come the Nelsons (1952)
- The Adventures of Ozzie and Harriet (320 episodes, 1952–1966)
- Peyton Place (1957)
- The Remarkable Mr. Pennypacker (1959)
- The Big Circus (1959)
- Day of the Outlaw (1959)
- -30- (1959)
- The Big Show (1961)
- Hondo (1 episode, 1967)
- Swing Out, Sweet Land (1970)
- The D.A. (1 episode, 1971)
- Smash-Up on Interstate 5 (1976)
- Up in Smoke (1978)
- The Love Boat (1 episode, 1978)
- An Ozzie and Harriet Christmas (1981 TV special on KTLA in Los Angeles)
- High School U.S.A. (1983)
- A Family for Joe (1990)
- Cry-Baby (1990)

=== Director ===
- The Adventures of Ozzie and Harriet (12 episodes)
- O.K. Crackerby! (Unknown episodes)
- Childish Things (1969)
- Easy to Be Free (1973)
- Ozzie's Girls (1973)
- Death Screams (1982)
- Last Plane Out (1983)
- Goodnight, Beantown (1 episode, 1984)
- A Rare Breed (1984)

=== Producer ===
- Ozzie's Girls (1973)
- Easy to Be Free (1973)
- Last Plane Out (1983)

== Awards ==
Year	Award	Category	Work	Result
1996	Hollywood Walk of Fame	Television (star at 1501 Vine Street)	The Adventures of Ozzie and Harriet	Honored
2006	TV Land Awards	Favorite Singing Siblings (shared with Ricky Nelson)	The Adventures of Ozzie and Harriet	Nominated
