= Father Dowling Mysteries =

American mystery television series (1989–1991)

- Genre: Crime drama; Mystery
- Based on: Father Dowling Mystery by Ralph McInerny
- Developed by: Dean Hargrove; Joel Steiger
- Starring: Tom Bosley; Tracy Nelson; James Stephens; Mary Wickes
- Country of origin: United States
- Original language: English
- No. of seasons: 3
- No. of episodes: 43 (list of episodes)

Production
- Running time: 46 minutes (per episode)
- Production companies: The Fred Silverman Company; Dean Hargrove Productions; Viacom Productions

Original release
- Network: NBC
- Release: January 20 – March 10, 1989
- Network: ABC
- Release: January 4, 1990 – May 2, 1991

Father Dowling Mysteries, known as Father Dowling Investigates in the United Kingdom, is an American mystery television series first aired from January 20, 1989, to May 2, 1991. The series was preceded by the 1987 television movie Fatal Confession. NBC aired the first season, while ABC broadcast two additional seasons.

The premise follows Catholic priest Father Dowling, who solves murders, abductions, and other mysteries in his Chicago parish, assisted by young streetwise nun Sister Stephanie, despite hindrance from the Bishop's representative Father Prestwick.

== History ==
The show is based upon characters created by Ralph McInerny in a series of mystery novels, but neither the pilot TV movie nor the subsequent regular season episodes are actual adaptations of any of McInerny's stories. The show was also heavily influenced by G. K. Chesterton's Father Brown novels.

The series was developed for television by Dean Hargrove and Joel Steiger, and produced by The Fred Silverman Company and Dean Hargrove Productions in association with Viacom Productions.

== Synopsis ==
Father Francis ("Frank") Dowling (Tom Bosley) is a Catholic priest who continually stumbles upon murders, abductions and other crimes in his parish (the fictional Parish of St Michael's) in Chicago, Illinois. Because of the Chicago connection, many of the cases are mob-related. His legal first name of Francis is revealed in the episode The Movie Mystery, when he's talking to the detective in charge of the case.

Fr. Frank is assisted by Sister Stephanie ("Steve") Oskowski, a nun assigned to the parish to minister to its members. It is Sr. Steve who does much of the legwork in the investigations. She's a streetwise nun with a Polish surname who grew up in a rough housing project in the diocese. She can hotwire a car, and pick any lock, among other things. Because she knows the "language of the streets" she uses this to her advantage (not just when investigating a mystery, but also in her ministry). Although she is much younger than Father Frank, the two work smoothly together as a team. He is not just a mentor to her, it's obvious she looks up to him as the father she never had.

Father Dowling has an identical twin brother, Blaine (also played by Tom Bosley). A thief and con artist, who isn't above framing his brother for his crimes, Blaine appears three times: in The Face in the Mirror Mystery, The Woman Scorned Mystery, and The Fugitive Priest Mystery.

Father Philip Prestwick, who provides comic relief, is a social-climbing assistant to the Archbishop. Father Phil just happens to drop in before every meal.

Mrs Marie Gillespie is both the parish secretary and the housekeeper of the Rectory (in which the parish priest lives).

A further recurring character is a female Chicago police officer, Detective Sergeant Clancy (Regina Krueger), who is Father Dowling's friend and principal police contact in the first two seasons. In season 3 Dick O'Neill replaces her in some episodes, as Lieutenant Foster, an old friend of Frank's in the police, and a devout Catholic, who Frank browbeats into doing him occasional favors during the investigations.

The mysteries usually begin with a mysterious visitor to St Michael's church, or to the parish Rectory next door where Father Dowling lives. In the first season, Sister Steve lives in a convent with the other nuns in her Order ("The Pretty Baby Mystery"); but in the second season she takes her meals at the Rectory, and when her brother is accused of murder (in the episode "The Sanctuary Mystery") he's shown sheltering in her bedroom at the Rectory. Throughout all three seasons she's also a chauffeur for Father Dowling, who doesn't drive. Because she's a car enthusiast, and reformed car thief, she handles the parish station wagon like a professional stuntman.

Between attending to parish secretarial and housekeeping duties, Marie takes phone messages for the duo while they're out travelling all over the city investigating their latest case. Meanwhile, Fr. Phil pops in and out of the Rectory, almost always at mealtimes. Marie and Father Phil provide light relief together, with a comic double-act, forever squabbling over Father Dowling's involvement in police matters, or about parish duties. However, Marie always emerges victorious.

Phil's devotion to never missing a meal at the Rectory is gradually developed into a running gag. In addition, Phil's attempts at keeping on the Bishop's good side (another running gag) are a further source of comic relief.

In the episode The Legacy Mystery (aired April 4, 1990), Tom Bosley was reunited with his Happy Days co-star, Marion Ross, who plays the mother of a wealthy businessman accused of stealing valuable artwork.

=== Pilot movie ===
The two-hour TV movie pilot Fatal Confession originally aired November 30, 1987, on NBC.

There were few similarities to the books written by McInerny, with the principal character even changing his name (in the novels, he was Roger Dowling), while the setting was changed from a rural parish in the small town of Fox River to the city of Chicago – a setting which was borrowed from another series of novels by McInerny, concerning a Chicago nun. For TV, the nun changed her name, became streetwise, lost many years of age, and metamorphosed into Father Dowling's youthful assistant.

Father Prestwick did not appear in the 1987 pilot. In the first episode of the series, "The Missing Body Mystery", he is brought in by the Bishop to evaluate Father Dowling's parish, and Prestwick is initially appointed to replace him. At the end of the second episode, Prestwick is reassigned to a parish in Alaska: hence he does not appear again until the final Season 1 episode, "The Pretty Baby Mystery" (when it's said he had offended the Bishop in Anchorage, Alaska, and been kicked out there). From the start of Season 2 he becomes one of the regular cast.

=== Regular series ===
The show was due to begin in 1988, but because of a writers' strike it did not begin to air weekly until January 1989.

For the first season, on NBC, the episodes were principally written by Supervising Producer Robert Hamilton, who contributed five of the scripts, but Hamilton was dropped when NBC cancelled the show after just eight episodes.

When ABC picked up the show for the second and third seasons (initially as a mid-season replacement), the show's executive producer, Dean Hargrove, together with Joyce Burditt, became the backbone of the writing team, frequently writing episodes jointly (Hargrove had begun his career as a scriptwriter, on the TV series The Man from U.N.C.L.E.). Gerry Conway, whose career began as a well-regarded writer at Marvel Comics, was now appointed as a script consultant, initially acting as script editor on the series before being promoted to co-producer for the third season, also writing many of the episodes.

For the third and longest season (the show's only full season), Brian Clemens, who had been producer and executive producer on The Avengers and had written many of its best regarded episodes, was added as a script consultant, and wrote or co-wrote many third-season episodes, a number of them in collaboration with co-producer Gerry Conway.

Although the show was set in Chicago, the first season was actually filmed in Denver, Colorado, where the filming locations used included the Church of the Annunciation, at 3621 Humboldt Street, which stood in for St Michael's parish church.

At the time the show was being made, Bosley's co-star Tracy Nelson ("Sister Steve") was married to actor William R. Moses, the featured guest star who plays her ex-boyfriend in season one ("The Man Who Came to Dinner Mystery").

The theme music for the regular series was composed by Dick De Benedictis.

The regular series episodes ran approximately 46 minutes and 30 seconds.

== Cast ==
Father Dowling (Tom Bosley) and Sister Steve (Tracy Nelson)

- Tom Bosley as Father Frank Dowling / Blaine Dowling
- Tracy Nelson as Sister Stephanie "Steve" Oskowski
- James Stephens as Father Philip Prestwick (main: Seasons 2–3; guest: Season 1)
- Mary Wickes as Marie

The program featured many notable guest stars, some before they had achieved fame, including: John Astin, Jack Bannon, Roscoe Lee Browne, Steven Culp, Stephen Dorff, Stacy Edwards, Fionnula Flanagan, Michelle Forbes, Kurt Fuller, Annie Golden, Grant Heslov, Laurie Holden, Stanley Kamel, Andreas Katsulas, Yaphet Kotto, Diane Ladd, Anthony LaPaglia, Scott Marlowe, Kiel Martin, David McCallum, Colm Meaney, William R. Moses, Craig Richard Nelson, Leslie Nielsen, Ethan Phillips, John Slattery, Brenda Strong, Robin Thomas, Sada Thompson, Tony Todd, John Vernon, Kate Vernon, Robert Walden and David Warner.

== Episodes ==
| Season | Episodes | Originally released | | |
| Season | Episodes | First released | Last released | Network |
|---|---|---|---|---|
| TV-movie | | November 30, 1987 | | NBC |
| 1 | 8 | January 20, 1989 | March 10, 1989 | NBC |
| 2 | 13 | January 4, 1990 | April 26, 1990 | ABC |
| 3 | 22 | September 20, 1990 | May 2, 1991 | ABC |

After its first season, NBC cancelled the show. It was picked up by ABC and aired for two more seasons. In total, Father Dowling Mysteries comprises a 2-hour TV movie plus 43 one-hour episodes.

=== Production credits ===
- Executive Producers Fred Silverman and Dean Hargrove
- Executive in Charge of Production Mike Moder
- Supervising Producer Robert Hamilton (season 1)
- Supervising Producer Robert Schlitt (season 2)
- Produced by Barry Steinberg (season 1, 2)
- Co-Producer David Solomon (season 1, 2)

=== Home media ===
CBS DVD (distributed by Paramount) has released all three seasons on DVD in Region 1.

CBS DVD released Father Dowling Mysteries: The Complete Series on DVD in Region 1 in June 2017.

In Region 2, Acorn Media released the first season on DVD in the UK on June 18, 2012, but was released under the title Father Dowling Investigates.

In Region 4, Madman Entertainment released the first season on DVD in Australia on November 2, 2011.

There was also a VHS released in region 1 on the January 24, 2000, of the "Fatal Confession" TV movie.

| DVD Name | Ep # | Release dates | | |
| DVD Name | Ep # | Region 1 | Region 2 | Region 4 |
|---|---|---|---|---|
| The Complete First Season | 9 | February 7, 2012 | June 18, 2012 | November 2, 2011 |
| The Complete Second Season | 13 | July 10, 2012 | N/A | N/A |
| The Complete Third and Final Season | 22 | March 12, 2013 | N/A | N/A |
| The Complete Series | 44 | June 6, 2017 | N/A | N/A |

== See also ==
- 1987 in television
