= Red Skelton (disambiguation) =

Richard "Red" Skelton (1913–1997) was an American comedian.

Red Skelton may also refer to:

- The Red Skelton Program (1941–1953), a U.S. radio program starring the titular comedian
- The Red Skelton Show (1951–1971), a U.S. TV program starring the titular comedian
- Red Skelton Memorial Bridge, Vincennes, Indiana, USA; over the Wabash River

== See also ==
- Skelton (disambiguation)
- Red (disambiguation)
