= The Count of Monte Cristo (radio program) =

American old-time radio adventure program

- Genre: Adventure
- Country of origin: United States
- Language: English
- TV adaptations: The Count of Monte Cristo (1956); The Count of Monte Cristo (1964, British)
- Starring: Carleton Young
- Announcer: Rod O'Connor; Charles Arlington; Dick Wynn
- Written by: Anthony Ellis
- Directed by: Thomas Freebairn-Smith; Jaime del Valle
- Original release: 1944 – January 1, 1952
- Opening theme: The Sylvia Ballet
- Sponsored by: Peralto Wines (Don Lee Network)

The Count of Monte Cristo is an American old-time radio adventure program. It was broadcast on the Don Lee Network on the West Coast in the 1944–1945 season and on the Mutual Broadcasting System December 19, 1946 - January 1, 1952.

== Format ==
Derived from the novel The Count of Monte Cristo by Alexandre Dumas, the program focused on the adventures of Edmond Dantes, who was sentenced to life in prison after being convicted on a false accusation of treason. Dantes escaped from prison and fought corruption in 18th-century France.

The episodes on the Don Lee Network were sponsored by Peralto Wines.

== Personnel ==
Carleton Young had the title role. Rene Michon (the count's "faithful manservant") was portrayed first by Ferdinand Munier and later by Parley Baer. Actors who frequently had supporting roles included William Conrad, John Dehner, Virginia Gregg, Joseph Kearns, Barbara Lee, Paul Marion, Howard McNear, Jay Novello, Jack Petruzzi, and Vic Rodman. Announcers were Rod O'Connor, Charles Arlington, and Dick Wynn.

Thomas Freebairn-Smith directed the episodes on the Don Lee Network, and Jaime del Valle directed those on Mutual. Anthony Ellis was the writer. The orchestra was led by Dean Fossler.
