= Over My Dead Body (1942 film) =

1942 film by Malcolm St. Clair

- Directed by: Malcolm St. Clair
- Written by: Edward James
- Starring: Milton Berle; Mary Beth Hughes; Reginald Denny
- Cinematography: Lucien Andriot
- Edited by: J. Watson Webb Jr.
- Music by: Cyril J. Mockridge; Emil Newman
- Distributed by: 20th Century Fox
- Release dates: December 25, 1942 (New York City); January 15, 1943 (United States)
- Running time: 68 minutes
- Country: United States
- Language: English

Over My Dead Body is a 1942 American mystery film directed by Malcolm St. Clair starring Milton Berle, Mary Beth Hughes and Reginald Denny.

== Plot ==
Jason Cordry (Milton Berle) is a mystery writer whose plots are so convoluted that even he cannot comprehend them, and they are often left uncompleted.

His sympathetic wife, Patricia (Mary Beth Hughes), thinks she has discovered a winning story when she overhears three men discussing plans for a criminal endeavor. Jason, willing to take a risk for a good plot, decides to confess to a murder he did not commit. He incorrectly assumes that he can easily prove his innocence once he has extracted a story from the experience. He is almost convicted of the homicide, but at the last moment he is exonerated.

== Cast ==
- Milton Berle as Jason Cordry
- Mary Beth Hughes as Patricia Cordry
- Reginald Denny as Richard 'Dick' Brenner
- Frank Orth as Detective
- William B. Davidson as Crole
- Wonderful Smith as Wonderful
- J.Pat O'Malley as Petie Stuyvesant
- Emory Parnell as Police Capt. Grady
