= Edna Stillwell =

American comedy writer (1915–1982)

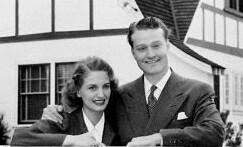
- Born: May 25, 1915; Missouri
- Died: November 15, 1982 (aged 67); Torrance, California
- Occupations: Comedy Writer; Manager
- Spouses: Richard "Red" Skelton (m. 1931; div. 1943) Frank Borzage (m. 1945; div. 1949) Leon George Pound (m. 1963; died 1976)

Edna Stillwell (May 25, 1915 - November 15, 1982) was a comedy and screenwriter best known for her work with Red Skelton.

== Early life ==
Edna Marie Stillwell was born in Missouri to parents George Vincent Stillwell and Dollie Belle Tarwater. She had three older siblings: Ethel, Orville, and Frances. At the age of 14, she was working as an usherette at Loew's in Kansas City, where she met comedian Richard "Red" Skelton. Shortly after, she met him again at a dance marathons also known as a walkathon, where she had been a cashier and Skelton was the master of ceremonies. Stillwell married Skelton on June 1, 1932 in Kansas City, Missouri, when she was 16 years old and he was 19 years old.

== Career ==
After the wedding, Stillwell assumed the role of business manager for Skelton after haggling with the manager of the walkathon in St. Louis who wanted to cut the entertainer's salary, leading Stillwell to approach the man and successfully demand more money. They settled on a salary of $100 a week for Skelton but over time she eventually negotiated it up to $500 a week for his walkathon gigs.

Stillwell was not only Skelton's manager but was also a formidable comedy writer who wrote extensively for Skelton. At the time, she was the only female gag writer in the business. Skelton repeatedly credited Stillwell for helping him build his successful career.

Stillwell was the mastermind behind many of Skelton's most popular skits and characters. Skelton's famous "Doughnut Dunkers" routine, which helped him earn celebrity status, took shape after the couple had breakfast in a diner in Montreal where Stillwell had the idea for the new routine as she and Skelton watched a man with his donuts and coffee. Stillwell wrote a little skit about a little man dunking his doughnut in his coffee, with Skelton's exaggerated visual impressions of the different ways in which to dunk and eat a doughnut. The skit not only won them the Loew's State Theater contract in New York City with generous compensation, it also opened the door to many more opportunities for Skelton in the entertainment world. Stillwell is also credited for dreaming up Skelton's famous Mean Widdle Kid character, also known as "Junior," shortly after the couple married as Skelton performed the character at home with Stillwell. That soon famous phrase "I dood it!" was all Skelton's creation, but the idea of refining the character for use in radio shows was Stillwell's idea.

When Skelton replaced Red Foley as the host of Avalon Time in 1938 on NBC, Stillwell also joined the show's cast in the role of heckler, throwing insults at Skelton. Stillwell was also a writer for the show and developed a system of selecting written materials from the other show writers, adding her own, and filing away unused gags and lines for later use. Stillwell is credited as a writer on The Raleigh Cigarette Program radio show, which starred Skelton. She was also the chief writer on The Red Skelton Show which aired from 1951 to 1971.

== Personal life ==
In 1942, Stillwell announced she was filing for divorce from Skelton, but that she would remain as his manager and continue to write material for him. Their divorce was finalized in February 1943. Stillwell also remained the manager of Skelton's financial accounts as Skelton was known to spend money with reckless abandon. She managed Skelton's career until 1952, and in return she was paid a handsome weekly salary for her efforts.

In November 1945, Stillwell married Hollywood film director Frank Borzage. They later divorced in 1949.

In 1963, she married businessman Leon George Pound. They remained together until Pound's death in 1976.

Edna Stillwell died on November 15, 1982, at the Little Company of Mary Hospital in Torrance, California at the age of 67, from cancer.
