= Wonderful Smith =

American comedian (1911–2008)

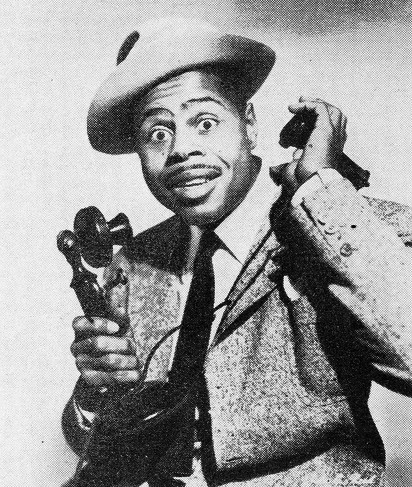
- Smith in 1947
- Born: Floyd Smith; June 21, 1911; Arkadelphia, Arkansas, U.S.
- Died: August 28, 2008 (aged 97); Northridge, California, U.S.
- Occupations: Actor; comedian

Wonderful Smith (June 21, 1911 – August 28, 2008) was an American actor and comedian.

== Early and personal life ==
Wonderful Smith was born Floyd Smith in 1911 in Arkadelphia, Arkansas, to parents Sam Smith, Sr., a farmer, and his wife Mattie. Smith left home to go to Los Angeles at the age of 16. According to his obituary in the Los Angeles Times, Smith married three times but had no children.

== Hello, Mr. President ==
As a comedian, he was most notable for his routine, "Hello, Mr. President" which was an imaginary conversation with American President Franklin Delano Roosevelt that lampooned the New Deal and World War II preparations. The routine appeared in Duke Ellington's satirical revue "Jump for Joy". No complete copy of the routine exists, although most of the routine appeared in the 1941 movie Top Sergeant Mulligan, performed by Smith, and was later re-released on the Smithsonian's Jump for Joy LP in 1988.

== Radio ==
Smith was a member of Red Skelton's radio shows in the early and mid-1940s. Others in the cast during this time were Ozzie and Harriet Nelson. Smith served in the U.S. Army during World War II where he worked as a disc jockey for Armed Forced Radio. When he left the service, he found that his role in the show had been changed, along with the program's format. Smith claimed racial and veterans' discrimination. The radio show's sponsor responded that his contract had been honored because, while his role in the show was smaller than it had been previously, he was not written out with his contract paid off.

== Television ==
Smith also made numerous appearances as an extra in various television series and movies, such as the head chef in The Bold Ones: The New Doctors and a janitor in the cavernous backstage scene in This is Spinal Tap.

== Personal appearances ==
Smith was a member of the "Wild" Bill Davis musical trio, which also included Davis and "Crazy Chris" Columbus. The group disbanded in 1956, and Smith became part of a larger group, the Swingin' Gentlemen, headed by Columbus.

== Legacy ==
Smith was the inspiration for the name of a Chicago-based indie rock group.

== Partial filmography ==
- Top Sergeant Mulligan (1941) – Wonderful
- Over My Dead Body (1942) – Wonderful
- Howzer (1973)
- A Piece of the Action (1977) – Daniel McLean
- Oh, God! (1977) – Court Clerk
- This Is Spinal Tap (1984) – Janitor
- To Sleep with Anger (1990) – Preacher
