= Ge Ge Pearson =

American actress (1917–1975)

- Pearson in 1946
- Born: Virginia Pearson; April 19, 1917
- Died: June 19, 1975 (aged 58)
- Occupation: Actress
- Years active: 1940s–1965
- Spouse: Hal Gerard (1943–19??)

Ge Ge Pearson (born Virginia Pearson; April 19, 1917 – June 19, 1975) was an American radio and television actress. She appeared in various cartoons, radio, and television shows.

== Early years ==
Pearson's father had a traveling stock theater company. She debuted with that troupe when she was 2 years old and continued acting with it for the next 12 years. When she was 3 years old, her father operated the only showboat that ever worked on the Pacific Coast.

== Career ==
On radio, Pearson played Mrs. Willy Lump Lump on The Red Skelton Show and Daisy Mulligan on The Gallant Heart, both on NBC.

On television, Pearson was the voice of Crusader Rabbit in the second series of the show of that title.

Pearson's ability to speak with dialects led to her being thought of as one of the most accomplished dialecticians in Hollywood.

== Personal life ==
On December 31, 1943, Pearson married Hal Gerard at El Rancho Vegas.

== Filmography ==
- Looney Tunes
- The Bugs n' Daffy Show
- That's Warner Bros
- Space Angel
- Top Cat
- The Huckleberry Hound Show
- Tales of Wells Fargo
- Crusader Rabbit
- Ethel Barrymore Theatre
- Damon Runyon Theater
- I Love Lucy
- Lux Video Theatre
- Mr. & Mrs. North
- Hollywood Theatre Time
- Groan and Grunt
- Campus Rhythm

=== Radio ===
- The Red Skelton Show
- Amos 'n' Andy
- My Favorite Husband
- On Stage
- Let George Do It
- The Amazing Mr. Malone
- The Man Called X
