= Avalon Time =

American old-time radio comedy/variety program (1938 to 1940)

- Other names: The Avalon Variety Show; The Red Foley Revue; The Red Skelton Revue; Red Skelton Time
- Genre: Comedy; Variety
- Running time: 30 minutes
- Country of origin: United States
- Language: English
- Home station: WLWO
- Syndicates: NBC Red
- Starring: Red Foley (1938–39); Red Skelton (Oct. – Dec. 1939); Cliff Arquette (Jan. – May 1940); Dick Todd (May 1940); Kitty O'Neill
- Announcer: Del King; Don McNeill; Peter Grant (commercial spokesman)
- Written by: Edna Stillwell; Jack Douglas
- Recording studio: Cincinnati, Ohio
- Original release: October 1, 1938 – May 1, 1940
- No. of series: 2
- No. of episodes: 83
- Opening theme: Avalon
- Ending theme: Avalon
- Sponsored by: Avalon cigarettes Sir Walter Raleigh Pipe Tobacco; Bulova

Avalon Time is an American old-time radio comedy/variety program that ran from 1938 to 1940 on NBC's Red Network. The program was named after its sponsor, Avalon cigarettes. Over the course of its run, Avalon Time was also sponsored by Sir Walter Raleigh Pipe Tobacco and the Bulova Watch Company.

The program is often regarded as comedian Red Skelton's first big break in show business and on radio.

== Show history ==
Tobacco company Brown & Williamson, former makers of Kool cigarettes, began producing Avalon in 1932. Avalon was Brown & Williamson's 'economy' brand, while never actually mentioning that term. Instead, they were promoted as either the cigarettes that "cost you less" or the cigarettes that "give you change back".

Avalon Time was the first Avalon-sponsored radio program with Show Boat premiering in 1939.

== The 'Reds' ==
'Red' was an ongoing theme and joke on Avalon Time. Coincidentally, all four hosts of the program had "red" hair. Two of the four hosts went by the name "Red". Also, the program was produced and broadcast over NBC's "Red" Network.

=== Red Foley ===
Avalon Time premiered as The Avalon Variety Show on October 1, 1938 with host Red Foley (1910–1968). Foley began his career in broadcasting in 1930 while still attending school at Georgetown College to perform with the house band on WLS-AM's National Barn Dance.

In 1937, Foley, with producer John Lair, created the radio program Renfro Valley Barn Dance for WHAS in Louisville, Kentucky.

With the premiere of The Avalon Variety Show in 1938, Foley became the first country artist to host a network radio program. Foley was the longest serving host of the program with frequent co-star Kitty O'Neill. Foley left Avalon in July 1939 and was replaced as host by up-and-coming comedian Red Skelton. Foley's replacement as singer was Curt Massey.

After Avalon Time, Foley returned to National Barn Dance and also became a lifelong member of the Grand Ole Opry. He also hosted Ozark Jubilee, the first popular country music television series, in the 1950s.

=== Red Skelton ===
Red Skelton (1913–1997) was the second host of Avalon Time. Skelton became well known for his "Doughnut Dunkers" routine which led to Skelton's first appearance on Rudy Vallée's The Fleischmann's Yeast Hour on August 12, 1937. Vallée's program had a talent show segment and those who were searching for stardom were eager to be heard on it. Vallée also booked veteran comic Joe Cook to appear as a guest with Skelton. The two proceeded to trade jokes about their home towns, with Skelton contending to Cook, an Evansville native, that the city was a suburb of Vincennes, Skelton's hometown. The show received enough fan mail after the performance to invite both comedians back two weeks after Skelton's initial appearance and again in November of that year.

On October 1, 1938, Skelton replaced Red Foley as the host of Avalon Time. Skelton's first wife Edna also joined the show's cast, under her maiden name of Stillwell. The Skeltons worked on Avalon Time until late 1939.

Skelton went on to do his own radio show, The Raleigh Cigarette Program, on October 7, 1941. The bandleader for the show was Ozzie Nelson; his wife, Harriet, who worked under her maiden name of Hilliard, was the show's vocalist and also worked with Skelton in skits.

Skelton went on to have his own successful television series named after him that ran on CBS and NBC for 20 years.

=== Cliff Arquette ===
Comedian Cliff Arquette (1905–1974) replaced Skelton as host of Red Skelton Time in January 1940. Arquette made a guest appearance on the show just a week earlier in December 1939. The title of the program was officially changed to Avalon Time when Arquette came aboard as host.

Arquette began his career as a pianist in the early 1920s soon joining the Henry Halstead orchestra in 1923. Arquette had made a few appearances on radio including an appearance on The Jack Benny Program in 1938. Arquette left Avalon Time in May 1940 and went on to establish his most memorable character, Charley Weaver.

=== Dick Todd ===
Canadian-born singer Dick Todd (1914–1973) took over from Cliff Arquette as host of Avalon Time in the spring of 1940. By then the ratings had plummeted and after only a few weeks, the show aired its last broadcast on May 1, 1940.
