= Rod O'Connor (announcer) =

American radio and television announcer and actor

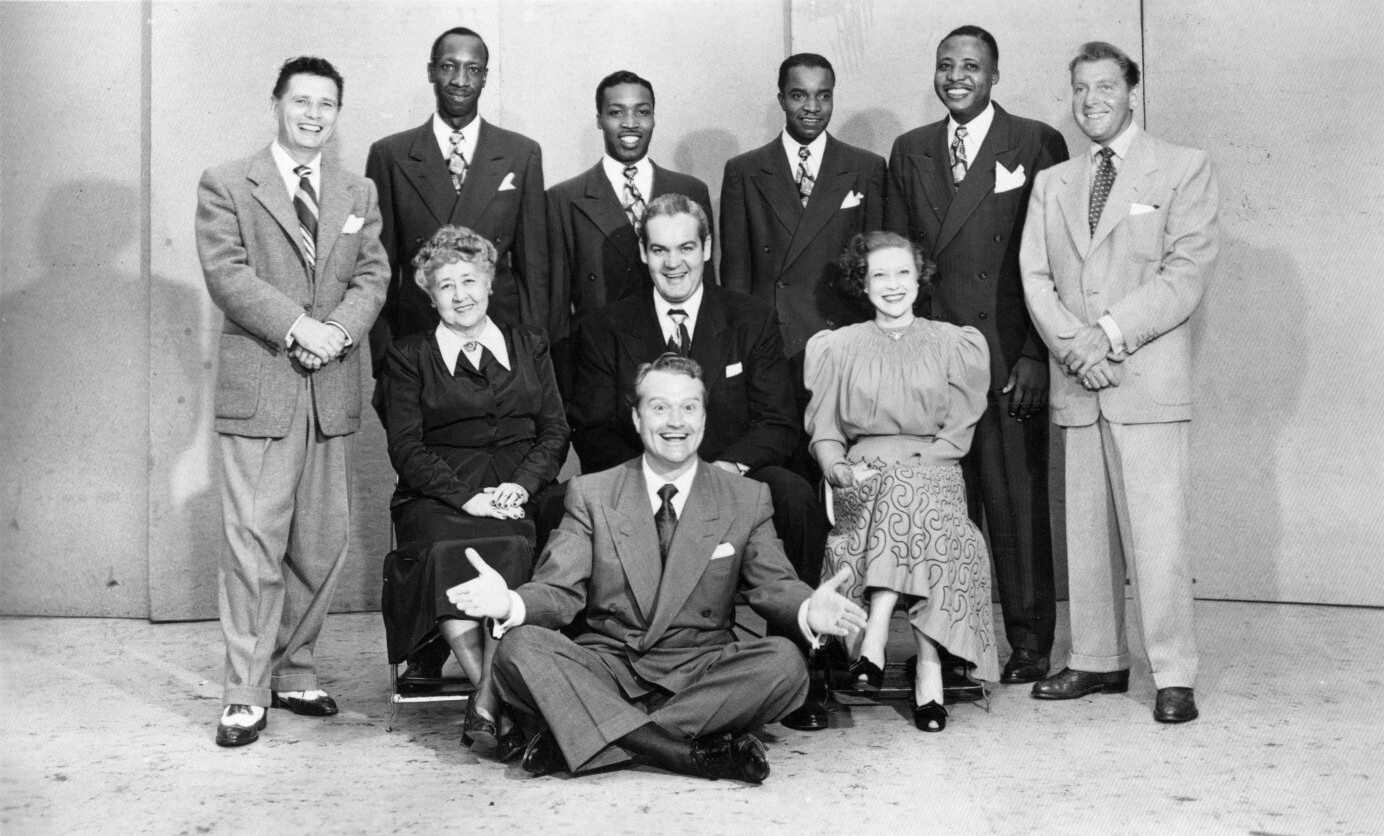
- Rod O'Connor at center, behind Red Skelton
- Born: Roderic George O'Connor; January 18, 1914; Houston, Texas, U.S.
- Died: June 5, 1964 (aged 50); Los Angeles, California, U.S.
- Spouses: Virginia Drake (divorced); Sylvia Cannon (m. 1942–1964)
- Children: 3
- Presenting career
- Show: House Party; Duffy's Tavern; The Red Skelton Show
- Stations: KUTA, Salt Lake City, Utah
- Network: Blue Network/NBC
- Show: Don McNeill's Breakfast Club; The First Nighter Program
- Station: WGN
- Network: CBS
- Country: United States

Roderic George "Rod" O'Connor Sr. (January 18, 1914 – June 5, 1964) was an American radio and television announcer and occasional actor during the early years of television's golden age.

O'Connor built a name for himself as the announcer for both Don McNeill's Breakfast Club and The First Nighter Program at WGN Radio in Chicago. He would leave Chicago for New York and after that, World War II.

It was while serving in the army that O'Connor met comedian Red Skelton. The two became good friends and upon arrival back into the United States, Skelton offered O'Connor an announcing gig on his Raleigh Cigarette Program in 1945. O'Connor also stayed on when Skelton went to television with The Red Skelton Show.

During his announcing career, O'Connor worked some of the biggest names in radio including Art Linkletter, Loretta Young, Dennis Day, Rudy Vallée and Danny Thomas.

== Early life and career ==
Roderic George O'Connor was born in Houston, Texas, on January 18, 1914, to parents George O'Connor and Grace (née Cover). O'Connor's family moved to Utah when he was young and his father became an Ogden City commissioner. O'Connor had a brother; Joseph Richard O'Connor, and two sisters; Kathleen Greenelsh and Nora Deis.

O'Connor began work joining the staff of KUTA Radio in Salt Lake City in 1938. He then went on to announce for KSL also in Salt Lake then WCCO in Minneapolis. O'Connor finally settled at WGN in Chicago where he served as the announcer for Don McNeill's Breakfast Club and The First Nighter Program.

Shortly after he finished his engagement at WGN, O'Connor met comedian Red Skelton who had just been discharged from a Virginia army hospital and was soon about to return to The Raleigh Cigarette Program after an 18-month hiatus. In need of a new announcer to replace Truman Bradley, Skelton came across O'Connor. O'Connor remained with Skelton until his radio show came to an end in 1953. O'Connor also went to television with Red on The Red Skelton Show in 1951. He even made a small appearance in The Fuller Brush Man, a 1948 film starring Skelton

In addition to Red Skelton's radio show, O'Connor was also the announcer for the majority of the 10-year run of NBC's Duffy's Tavern starring Ed Gardner. O'Connor also was a part of the 25-year run of Art Linkletter's House Party on CBS Radio. O'Connor also announced Glamour Manor, a musical variety program starring Cliff Arquette (Charley Weaver), during the 1945-46 radio season on ABC. He was replaced the following season by Don Wilson of Jack Benny fame.

== Personal life and death ==
O'Connor was married twice. His first marriage to Virginia Drake ended in divorce. He remarried in South Dakota in 1942 to Sylvia Cannon. O'Connor was a member of the Catholic Church, the Screen Actors Guild and the American Federation of Television and Radio Artists, where he served on the national board for several years. O'Connor had two sons; Dennis and Roderic George Jr., and a daughter; Pamela O'Connor.

O'Connor died on June 5, 1964, in a Hollywood hospital after a battle with cancer. O'Connor was 50 years old. He was survived by his widow Sylvia, his three children, his father, two brothers and his sister. His funeral was held on June 8 at the Blessed Sacrament Church in Los Angeles. He was buried in Holy Cross Cemetery in Culver City, California.

== Filmography ==
Year	Title	Role	Notes
1948	The Fuller Brush Man	District Attorney	Uncredited
1948	Southern Yankees	Major Grigsby	Uncredited
1951	Texas Carnival	Bartender	Uncredited
1952	The Red Skelton Show	Bartender	"On the House" skit
1953	All Ashore	Newscaster	Uncredited
1954	The Loretta Young Show	Sandy Ware	1 episode
1954	Father Knows Best	Announcer	1 episode
1954-1955	I Led 3 Lives	Duncan Malone	2 episodes
1955	Fury	Announcer	1 episode
