= Red Skelton Memorial Bridge =

- Coordinates: 38.707176°N 87.518988°W
- Carries: US 50
- Crosses: Wabash River
- Locale: Vincennes, Indiana

History
- Opened: 1963

The Red Skelton Memorial Bridge carries U.S. Route 50 over the Wabash River (across the Illinois state line) outside of Vincennes, Indiana. It is named after Vincennes-native American comedian Red Skelton, who joined Indiana Governor Matthew Welsh for the dedication of the bridge on September 3, 1963.
