= The Raleigh Cigarette Program =

- Other names: The Raleigh Cigarette Program Starring Red Skelton; The Red Skelton Show (see below)
- Genre: Comedy
- Running time: 30 minutes
- Country of origin: United States
- Language: English
- Syndicates: NBC
- Starring: Red Skelton; Ozzie Nelson; Harriet Nelson; Wonderful Smith
- Announcer: Truman Bradley
- Written by: Edna Stillwell; Jack Douglas; Benedict Freedman; John Fenton Murray; Sol Saks
- Directed by: Keith McLeod
- Produced by: Keith McLeod
- Original release: October 7, 1941 – June 6, 1944
- No. of series: 3
- Sponsored by: Raleigh cigarettes

The Raleigh Cigarette Program (alternatively known as The Raleigh Cigarette Program Starring Red Skelton) was an American old-time radio comedy program that starred comedian Red Skelton.

Skelton was, at the time, an up-and-coming comedian who made it big with an appearance on The Fleischmann's Yeast Hour (a.k.a. The Rudy Vallée Show), in 1937 and for hosting Avalon Time on NBC for several months after the departure of country singer Red Foley in 1939.

Other principal performers on the program included actors Ozzie and Harriet Nelson and comedian Wonderful Smith. Ozzie Nelson was the bandleader on the program while Harriet served as the program's vocalist and in the female leads, even, on occasion, serving as Skelton's comic foil. Smith served as Skelton's antagonist on the program.

Skelton introduced his famous catchphrase "I dood it!" on this program along with his popular long-running characters "Clem Kadiddlehopper" and "Junior, the mean widdle kid".

The program originally premiered on October 7, 1941, on NBC. The program was a hit in the ratings airing Tuesday nights at 10:30 for its entire three season run. The program was cancelled after Skelton was drafted into World War II. The final broadcast of the show aired on June 6, 1944. The program spun off The Adventures of Ozzie and Harriet which premiered on CBS in October of that year.

The program was sponsored by the Raleigh cigarettes division of the Brown & Williamson Tobacco Company.

== Production ==
The Raleigh Cigarette Program premiered on October 7, 1941, on the Red Network of the National Broadcasting Company. The program starred comedian Red Skelton. Skelton had already established himself as a professional comedian and radio personality as a guest star on Rudy Vallée's Royal Gelatin Hour and as host of Avalon Time.

The program was sponsored by Brown & Williamson's Raleigh cigarettes. Brown & Williamson were also the manufacturers of several other popular brands of cigarettes including Kool, Lucky Strike and Pall Mall. Raleigh cigarettes designed the program to be part variety and part comedy. Each episode usually began with a topical monologue, followed by a band number, then the main sketch/storyline. The program was placed in the Tuesday night at 10:30 timeslot, following Bob Hope's popular Pepsodent Show.

Skelton's wife at the time, Edna Stillwell, served as head writer of the program as she had been on Skelton's Avalon Time. According to author Wesley Hyatt, Skelton and Stillwell devised a system for cataloging jokes for later reference. "He grouped his jokes on 3-by-5 index cards under one-word categories– "Birds", "Hotels", "Tennis" and so forth– and updated some over the years to make references more contemporary."

Also serving on the writing staff of the program were Jack Douglas, Benedict Freedman and John Fenton Murray. Douglas had written for Skelton before on his previous radio program Avalon Time. Freedman was also from Avalon Time. He had been hired to write for Skelton when he was 19. These three men would continue writing for Skelton week into his move to television in the 1950s.

Sol Saks also wrote for the program but only for two weeks. According to Hyatt, "Saks never got to work with his fellow writers although he did get the chance to see Red in dress rehearsal, but after the show was over, he'd pass by Saks without recognizing him." Saks later went on to write for the program's fellow co-stars Ozzie and Harriet Nelson on their eventual radio program The Adventures of Ozzie and Harriet and their television sitcom of the same name. Saks also went on to create the successful fantasy sitcom Bewitched for ABC in 1964.

Also in the cast of the program with Skelton were Ozzie Nelson and his wife Harriet Hilliard. Ozzie Nelson served as the program's orchestra leader/musical director while Hilliard was the program's vocalist. Hilliard also provided the voice of several of the female characters on the program and occasionally served as Skelton's comic foil. Black comedian Wonderful Smith also was involved in the principal cast also sometimes as Skelton's foil.

== Cast and characters ==
=== Red Skelton ===
==== Clem Kadiddlehopper ====
Red Skelton introduced two characters the first season of this radio program that would stay with him as crowd pleasers well into his years on television. One of those characters was Clem Kadiddlehopper. Clem Kadiddlehopper was described as "a quintessential lamebrained country bumpkin". The inspiration for the Kadiddlehopper character came from a person named Carl Hopper.

Carl Hopper was one of Skelton's childhood friends and old next-door neighbor in his hometown of Vincennes, Indiana. As a child, Hopper had issues with his hearing which usually led him to misconstrue hearing and speaking words, however, Hopper still managed to have a cheerful demeanor. Even though Hopper later got a hearing aid which allowed him to fare better as an adult, those memories of Hopper as a child stuck with Skelton throughout his career.

In order to get into character as Kadiddlehopper, Skelton would draw in his lower lip, adopt a somewhat bewildered look on his face and wear a hat with a turned up brim.

In early episodes of the program, Kadiddlehopper is said to be a cab driver. However, in later episodes, Kadiddlehopper takes on several different occupation but never did the program pinpoint a specific occupation for Kadiddlehopper.

==== Junior, The Mean Widdle Kid ====
The second of the two long-running characters introduced to listeners on The Raleigh Cigarette Program was a troublesome young lad named Junior. Junior, also known to listeners as "the mean widdle kid", was a troublemaker who never really liked listening to his parents and who disobeyed his mother frequently often to his own dismay.

===== "I Dood It!" =====
Skelton's famous catchphrase "I dood it!" was first heard on this program. It was used as the official catchphrase of "widdle" Junior. Anytime Junior was about to do something his parents would disapprove, he would think a moment and say "If I dood it, I gets a whipping." Then he would break something or cause trouble and exclaim the phrase "I dood it!"

The phrase became so popular and so synonymous with Skelton that it was the title of a 1943 movie starring Skelton. The film also starred alongside Skelton actress Eleanor Powell with musical interludes from Jimmy Dorsey and his orchestra. The film was a musical-comedy released through Metro-Goldwyn-Mayer. The film was also a box office success grossing nearly $2.2 million.

The character of Junior was so popular that during the beginnings of America's involvement with World War II in 1942 that the U.S. Army was able to raise enough funds to pay for a new much-needed bomber plane all simply by asking child listeners of the program to save and donate their spare change. When the money was raised for the plane, it was christened, “We Dood It!”.

=== Ozzie Nelson ===
Before breaking into radio, Nelson started out in show business as a band leader. Nelson's big break came in 1930 when he formed the Ozzie Nelson Band.

From 1930 through the 1940s, Nelson's band recorded prolifically—first on Brunswick (1930–1933), then Vocalion (1933–1934), then back to Brunswick (1934–1936), Bluebird (1937–1941), Victor (1941) and finally back to Bluebird (1941-through the 1940s). Nelson's records were consistently popular and in 1934 Nelson enjoyed success with his hit song, "Over Somebody Else's Shoulder" which he introduced. Nelson was their primary vocalist and (from August 1932) featured in duets with his other star vocalist, Harriet Hilliard whom he would marry in 1935.

Ozzie Nelson joined The Raleigh Cigarette Program originally as the program's orchestra leader/musical director. As the show progressed, however, Nelson gradually became written in to more and more sketches and episodes. Harriet also became a supporting cast member as well and the two became known as "America's favorite young couple". After Skelton left the air in 1944, Nelson moved to CBS where he developed and produced his own radio series, The Adventures of Ozzie and Harriet. The show went on the air with their sons played by actors until 1949, and in 1952 it moved over to television (the radio version continued for another two years). The show starred the entire family, and America watched Ozzie and Harriet raise their boys. The last television episode aired in 1966. To date, Ozzie and Harriet is the longest running live-action sitcom and the third longest running television sitcom behind the animated shows South Park and The Simpsons.

=== Harriet Hilliard ===
Like her husband, Harriet Hilliard also began her show business career in music.

She was born Peggy Louise Snyder in Des Moines, Iowa, the daughter of Hazel Dell (née McNutt) and Roy Hilliard Snyder. She appeared on the vaudeville stage when she was three years old and made her debut on Broadway in her teens.

She frequented the Cotton Club, began smoking at age 13, was briefly married to an abusive comedian and lived what has been described as "a high-flying life". She left high school before graduating and joined the Corps de Ballet at the Capitol Theater, later dancing in the Harry Carroll Revue and working as a straight woman for comedians Ken Murray and Bert Lahr. By 1932, she was still performing in vaudeville when she met the saxophone-playing bandleader Ozzie Nelson. Nelson hired her to sing with the band, under the name Harriet Hilliard. They married three years later and had two sons together; David Nelson and Ricky Nelson.

Hilliard followed her husband Ozzie onto The Raleigh Cigarette Program in 1941. Also like her husband, Hilliard was not to be in the supporting cast with Skelton. She was originally hired as the program's vocalist but, again like her husband, gradually grew into sketches and skits. Hilliard provided voices to most of the female characters heard on the program most notably Daisy June, Clem Kadiddlehopper's girlfriend, and Junior's mother.

She later went on to co-star with her husband on the radio and eventual television incarnation of The Adventures of Ozzie and Harriet before dying of congestive heart failure in 1994 at the age of 85.

=== Wonderful Smith ===
As a comedian, Wonderful Smith was most notable for his routine, "Hello, Mr. President" which was an imaginary conversation with American President Franklin Delano Roosevelt that lampooned the New Deal and World War II preparations. The routine appeared in Duke Ellington's satirical revue Jump for Joy.

Smith joined the program in various roles. Usually, Smith played the antagonist to Deadeye, another country bumpkin character voiced by Skelton. Smith went on to television. He died in an assisted living facility in Northridge, California in 2008.

== Broadcast history ==
The Raleigh Cigarette Program was broadcast Tuesday nights at 10:30 for its entire run. It followed Bob Hope's The Pepsodent Show.

== The Red Skelton Show ==
The Red Skelton Show
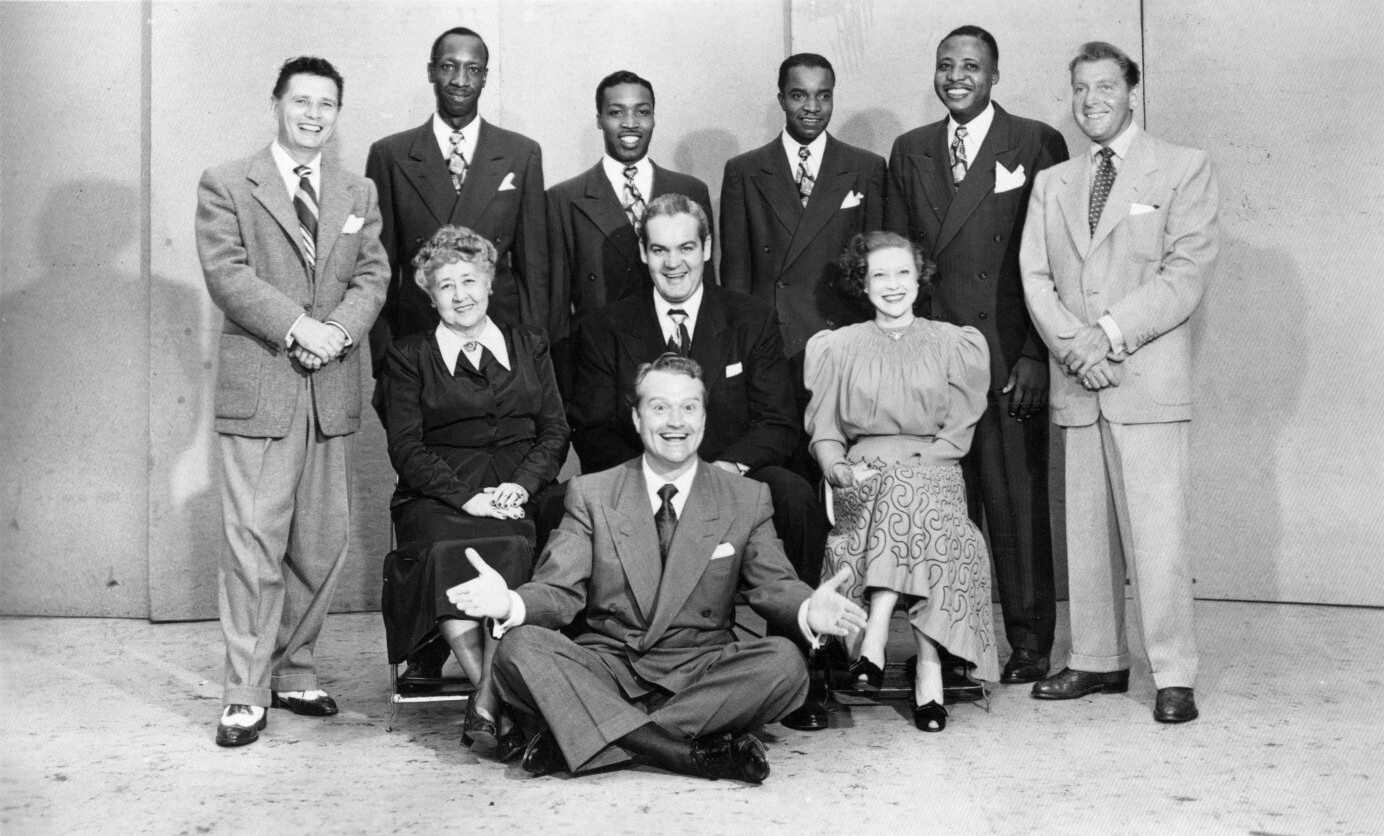
- 1948 cast photo
- Other names: The Raleigh Cigarette Program
- Genre: Comedy
- Running time: 30 minutes
- Country of origin: United States
- Language: English
- Syndicates: NBC; CBS
- Starring: Red Skelton; GeGe Pearson; Lurene Tuttle; Verna Felton; Wonderful Smith; Anita Ellis; Martha Wentworth; Dick Ryan; David Forrester; David Rose
- Announcer: Pat McGeehan; Rod O'Connor
- Written by: Edna Stillwell; Jack Douglas; Benedict Freedman; John Fenton Murray
- Directed by: Keith McLeod
- Produced by: Keith McLeod
- Original release: December 4, 1945 – May 26, 1953
- Other themes: Great Day
- Sponsored by: Raleigh cigarettes Tide; Norge

Red Skelton suffered from exhaustion and a nervous breakdown during his time in the military. He was admitted into a Virginia army hospital in the summer of 1945. Skelton was relieved of his army duties in September 1945.

Within three months, Skelton was back on the air. On December 4, 1945, The New Raleigh Cigarette Program premiered with the same sponsor, Sir Walter Raleigh Pipe Tobacco cigarettes, the same timeslot, Tuesdays at 10:30, and on the same network, NBC. The program also received the same high ratings and fan base of its predecessor.

Upon returning to radio, Skelton brought with him many new characters that were added to his repertoire: Bolivar Shagnasty, described as a "loudmouthed braggart"; Cauliflower McPugg, a boxer; Deadeye, a cowboy; Willie Lump-Lump, a fellow who drank too much; and San Fernando Red, a conman with political aspirations. By 1947, Skelton's musical conductor was David Rose, who would go on to television with him; he had worked with Rose during his time in the army and wanted Rose to join him on the radio show when it went back on the air.

Skelton's return to the airwaves also saw changes and additions to the cast. New cast members included GeGe Pearson, Lurene Tuttle and Verna Felton. Anita Ellis was brought on as the new vocalist. Wonderful Smith was the only member of the original Skelton supporting cast to reprise his roles on the new program. However, in 1949, Smith was let go from his contract.

Pearson replaced Harriet Nelson as Clem Kadiddlehopper's new girlfriend Sarah Dew. Pearson also became the voice of many of the female characters on the program such as Mrs. Willie Lump-Lump, Mrs. Bolivar Shagnasty, etc. Tuttle became the new voice of Junior's mother. Felton was the voice of Junior's grandmother "namaw". Rod O'Connor became the new announcer and Skelton's sidekick.

=== Censorship incident ===
On April 22, 1947, Skelton was censored by NBC two minutes into his radio show. When he and his announcer Rod O'Connor began talking about Fred Allen being censored the previous week, they were silenced for 15 seconds; comedian Bob Hope was given the same treatment once he began referring to the censoring of Allen. (Note: Fred Allen was censored when he referred to an imaginary NBC vice-president who was "in charge of program ends". He went on to explain to his audience that this vice-president saved these hours, minutes and seconds that radio programs ran over their allotted time until he had two weeks' worth of them and then used the time for a two-week vacation.) Skelton forged on with his lines for his studio audience's benefit; the material he insisted on using had been edited from the script by the network before the broadcast. He had been briefly censored the previous month for the use of the word "diaper". After the April incidents, NBC indicated it would no longer pull the plug for similar reasons.

=== Changes in sponsor and move to CBS ===
By 1948, costs for the show had gotten a little too high for Raleigh cigarettes. Sponsorship changed over from Brown & Williamson's Raleigh cigarettes to Procter & Gamble's Tide laundry detergent which had only been formed two years earlier, and the title of the program was changed to The Red Skelton Show. With the change of sponsor came a change in timeslot as the program moved to Friday nights at 9:30.

By 1949, William S. Paley, the then president and founder of CBS, had acquired several major talents from NBC in what is now known as the infamous "talent raids". Several of those "talents" included Amos 'n' Andy, Edgar Bergen and Charlie McCarthy, Burns and Allen and Jack Benny. In 1949, Red Skelton and his radio gang became a part of the growing list of acquisitions.

The last episode of The Red Skelton Show on NBC was broadcast on May 20, 1949. On October 2, 1949, CBS revamped the program. Most of the old cast from The Red Skelton Show moved with Skelton to CBS. Actor Dick Ryan and actress Martha Wentworth joined the cast. Wentworth, who had worked with fellow cast member Verna Felton on the radio program The Cinnamon Bear in 1937, portrayed the role of Polly the Panhandler. Skelton also introduced the character of San Fernando Red, a windy politician, among with several other characters on CBS.

CBS placed the program at 8:30 on Sunday nights. Tide continued to sponsor the series until about mid-1951 when Norge appliances picked up the tab for the program. The last broadcast for CBS aired on June 25, 1952.

=== Skelton moves back to NBC ===
On September 16, 1952, Skelton and his gang moved back to NBC. By this point in time, Skelton was kicking off the second season of his television show, also named The Red Skelton Show, on NBC Television. This radio season would prove to be Skelton's last. NBC cancelled the radio program and the final broadcast aired on May 26, 1953. His television series moved to CBS that fall where it remained for the next 17 years. For its last season, the show returned to NBC where it ended its 20-year run in March 1971 with reruns airing until August 1, 1971.

=== Cast ===
- Red Skelton as Clem Kadiddlehopper, Junior, the mean widdle kid, Willie Lump-Lump, Bolivar Shagnasty, Cauliflower McPugg, Deadeye, San Fernando Red and others.
- GeGe Pearson as Sarah Dew, Mrs. Willie Lump-Lump, Mrs. Bolivar Shagnasty and others.
- Lurene Tuttle as Junior's mother.
- Verna Felton as Namaw, Junior's grandmother.
- Wonderful Smith as a Skelton antagonist, usually Deadeye.
- Martha Wentworth as Polly the Panhandler.
- Anita Ellis as the vocalist.
- David Rose as the orchestra/bandleader and musical director.

=== Broadcast ===
Timeslot	Starting date	Ending date	Network	Sponsor
Tuesdays at 10:30-11:00 pm	December 4, 1945	1948	NBC	Sir Walter Raleigh Pipe Tobacco
Fridays at 9:30-10:00 pm	1948	May 20, 1949	NBC	Tide laundry detergent
Sundays at 8:30-9:00 pm	October 2, 1949	1951	CBS	Tide laundry detergent
Wednesdays at 9-9:30 pm	1951	June 25, 1952	CBS	Norge appliances
Tuesdays at 8:30-9:00 pm	September 16, 1952	May 26, 1953	NBC	Multiple sponsorship

== Skelton's later career and death ==
Skelton went on to make thousands of public appearances and whatnot until his retirement in 1993. Skelton died September 17, 1997, at the Eisenhower Medical Center in Rancho Mirage, California, at the age of 84 after what was described as "a long, undisclosed illness". He was interred in the family's private room in The Great Mausoleum's Sanctuary of Benediction at Forest Lawn Memorial Park, in Glendale, California, where his son, Richard, and former wife, Georgia, are also buried. Skelton was survived by his widow, Lothian Toland Skelton; his daughter, Valentina Marie Skelton Alonso; and granddaughter Sabrina Maureen Alonso.
