= Red Skelton =

American comedian (1913–1997)

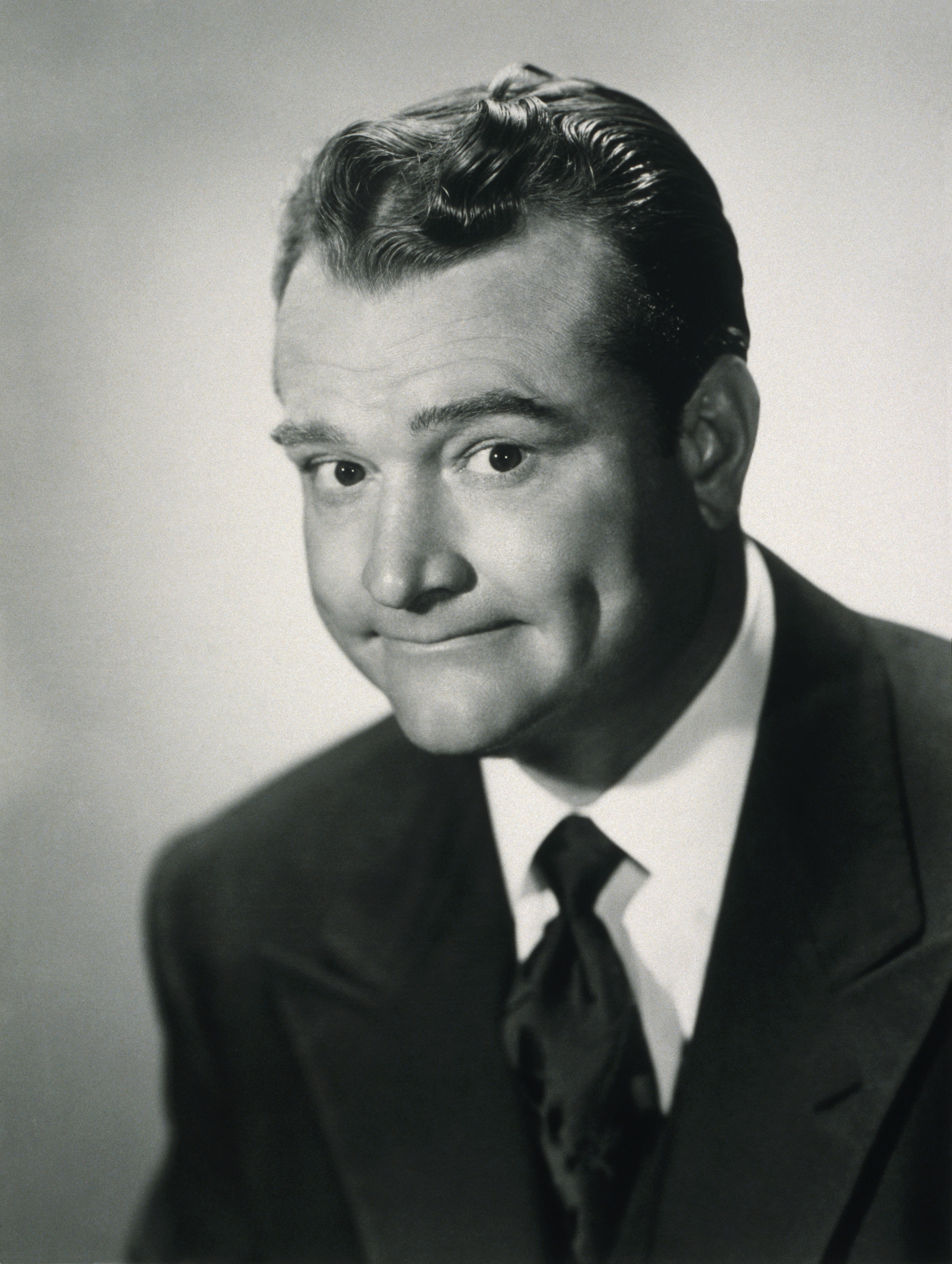
- Skelton in 1960
- Born: Richard Bernard Eheart; July 18, 1913; Vincennes, Indiana, U.S.
- Died: September 17, 1997 (aged 84); Rancho Mirage, California, U.S.
- Resting place: Forest Lawn Memorial Park
- Occupations: Actor; artist; comedian
- Years active: 1923–1993
- Spouses: Edna Marie Stillwell (m. 1931; div. 1943) Georgia Davis (m. 1945; div. 1971) Lothian Toland (m. 1973)
- Children: 2

Richard Bernard "Red" Skelton (July 18, 1913 – September 17, 1997) was an American entertainer best known for his national radio and television shows between 1937 and 1971, especially as host of the television program The Red Skelton Show. He has stars on the Hollywood Walk of Fame for his work in radio and television, and he also appeared in burlesque, vaudeville, films, nightclubs, and casinos, all while he pursued an entirely separate career as an artist.

Skelton began developing his comedic and pantomime skills from the age of 10, when he became part of a traveling medicine show. He then spent time on a showboat, worked the burlesque circuit, and then entered into vaudeville in 1934. The "Doughnut Dunkers" pantomime sketch, which he wrote together with his wife, launched a career for him in vaudeville, radio, and films. His radio career began in 1937 with a guest appearance on The Fleischmann's Yeast Hour, which led to his becoming the host of Avalon Time in 1938. He became the host of The Raleigh Cigarette Program in 1941, on which many of his comedy characters were created, and he had a regularly scheduled radio program until 1957. Skelton made his film debut in 1938 alongside Ginger Rogers and Douglas Fairbanks Jr. in Alfred Santell's Having Wonderful Time, and appeared in numerous musical and comedy films throughout the 1940s and 1950s, with starring roles in 19 films, including Ship Ahoy (1941), I Dood It (1943), Ziegfeld Follies (1946), Three Little Words (1950), and The Clown (1953).

Skelton was eager to work in television, even when the medium was in its infancy. The Red Skelton Show made its television premiere on September 30, 1951, on NBC. By 1954, Skelton's program moved to CBS, where it was expanded to one hour and renamed The Red Skelton Hour in 1962. Despite high ratings, the show was canceled by CBS in 1970, as the network believed that more youth-oriented programs were needed to attract younger viewers and their spending power. Skelton moved his program to NBC, where he completed his last year with a regularly scheduled television show in 1971. He spent his time after that making as many as 125 personal appearances a year and working on his paintings.

Skelton's paintings of clowns remained a hobby until 1964, when his wife Georgia persuaded him to show them at the Sands Hotel in Las Vegas while he was performing there. Sales of his originals were successful, and he also sold prints and lithographs, earning $2.5 million yearly on lithograph sales. At the time of his death, his art dealer said he thought that Skelton had earned more money through his paintings than from his television performances.

Skelton believed that his life's work was to make people laugh; he wanted to be known as a clown because he defined it as being able to do everything. He had a 70-year-long career as a performer and entertained three generations of Americans. His widow donated many of his personal and professional effects, including prints of his artwork, to Vincennes University, which established the Red Skelton Museum of American Comedy.

== Biography ==
=== Early years, the medicine show and the circus (1913–1929) ===
Skelton was born Richard Bernard Eheart on July 18, 1913, in Vincennes, Indiana, as the fourth son and youngest child of Joseph Elmer and Ida Mae (née Fields) Skelton. He had three older brothers: Denny Ishmael Skelton (1905–1943), Christopher M. Skelton (1907–1977) and Paul Fred Skelton (1910–1989).

During Skelton's lifetime there was some dispute about the year of his birth. Author Wesley Hyatt suggests that since Skelton began working at such an early age, he may have claimed he was older than he actually was to gain employment, using the birth certificate of one of his older brothers as proof that he was legally of age. Skelton contributed to this uncertainty late in life; he stated, in a People magazine story published in 1980, that he was in his seventies.

Skelton's father, a grocer, died two months before Richard was born; he had once been a clown with the Hagenbeck-Wallace Circus. Vincennes neighbors described the Skelton family as being extremely poor; a childhood friend remembered that her parents broke up a youthful romance between her sister and Skelton because they thought he had no future.

Because of the loss of his father, Skelton went to work as early as the age of seven, selling newspapers and taking on other odd jobs to help his family, who had lost the family store and their home. He quickly learned the newsboy's patter and would keep it up until a prospective buyer bought a copy of the paper just to quiet him.

According to later accounts, Skelton's early interest in becoming an entertainer was sparked by an incident that took place in Vincennes around 1923, when a stranger, supposedly the comedian Ed Wynn, approached Skelton, who was selling papers outside a Vincennes theater. When the man asked Skelton what events were going on in town, Skelton suggested he see the new show in town. The stranger turned out to be one of the show's stars, who purchased every paper Skelton had, providing enough money for the boy to purchase a ticket for himself, then later took the boy backstage to introduce him to the other performers. The experience prompted Skelton, who had already shown comedic tendencies, to pursue a career as a performer. (Note: Skelton also told another version of this actor and young newsboy story, with Raymond Hitchcock as the actor.)

Skelton discovered at an early age that he could make people laugh. Around this time he began performing in minstrel shows in Vincennes and on a showboat, The Cotton Blossom, that plied the Ohio and Missouri rivers. Skelton enjoyed his work on the riverboat, moving on only after he realized that showboat entertainment was coming to an end. Skelton dropped out of school around 1926 or 1927, when he was 13 or 14 years old.

Skelton, who was interested in all forms of acting, took a dramatic role with the John Lawrence stock theater company, but was unable to deliver his lines in a serious manner; the audience laughed instead. In another incident, while performing in Uncle Tom's Cabin, Skelton was on an unseen treadmill; when it malfunctioned and began working in reverse, the frightened young actor called out, "Help! I'm backing into heaven!" He was fired before completing a week's work in the role. At the age of 15, Skelton did some early work on the burlesque circuit, and reportedly spent four months with the Hagenbeck-Wallace Circus in 1929, when he was 16 years old.

Ida Skelton, who held multiple jobs to support her family after the death of her husband, did not suggest that her youngest son run away from home to become an entertainer, but "his destiny had caught up with him at an early age". She let him go with her blessing. Times were tough during the Great Depression, and it may have meant one fewer child for her to feed.

Around 1929, while Skelton was still a teen, he joined "Doc" R.E. Lewis's traveling medicine show as an errand boy who sold bottles of medicine to the audience. During one show, when Skelton accidentally fell from the stage, breaking several bottles of medicine as he fell, people laughed. Both Lewis and Skelton realized one could earn a living with this ability and the fall was worked into the show. He also told jokes and sang in the medicine show during his four years there. Skelton earned ten dollars a week, and sent all of it home to his mother. When she worried that he was keeping nothing for his own needs, Skelton reassured her: "We get plenty to eat, and we sleep in the wagon."

=== Burlesque to vaudeville (1929–1937) ===
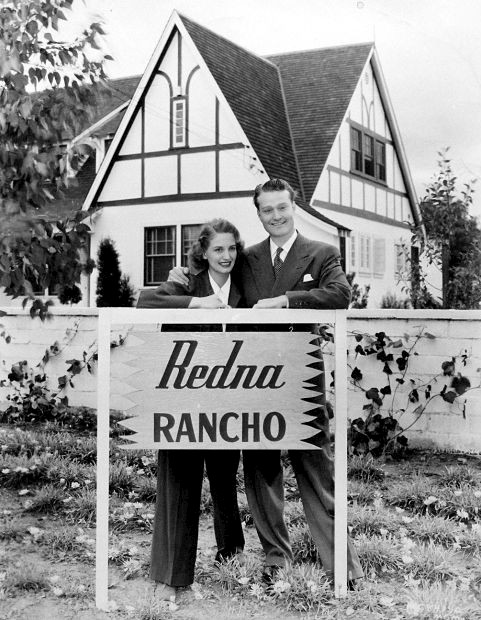
Red and Edna Skelton at home, 1942

As burlesque comedy material became progressively more ribald, Skelton moved on. He insisted that he was no prude; "I just didn't think the lines were funny". He became a sought-after master of ceremonies for dance marathons (known as "walkathons" at the time), a popular fad in the 1930s. The winner of one of the marathons was Edna Stillwell, an usher at the old Pantages Theater. (Note: Edna Stillwell had two marriages following her divorce from Skelton, first to director Frank Borzage and then to Leon George Pound.) She approached Skelton after winning the contest and told him that she did not like his jokes; he asked if she could do better. They married in 1931 in Kansas City, and Edna began writing his material. At the time of their marriage Skelton was one month away from his 18th birthday; Edna was 16.

When they learned that Skelton's salary was to be cut, Edna went to see the boss. Red resented her interference, until she came away with not only a raise, but additional considerations as well. Since he had left school at an early age, his wife bought textbooks and taught him what he had missed. With Edna's help, Skelton received a high school equivalency degree. (Note: Skelton became a well-read man with a fine memory which he began training in his youth.)

The couple put together an act and began booking it at small midwestern theaters. When an offer came for an engagement in Harwich Port, Massachusetts, some 2,000 miles from Kansas City, they were pleased to get it because of its proximity to their ultimate goal, the vaudeville houses of New York City. To get to Massachusetts they bought a used car and borrowed five dollars from Edna's mother, but by the time they arrived in St. Louis they had only fifty cents. Skelton asked Edna to collect empty cigarette packs; she thought he was joking, but did as he asked. He then spent their fifty cents on bars of soap, which they cut into small cubes and wrapped with the tinfoil from the cigarette packs. By selling their products for fifty cents each as fog remover for eyeglasses, the Skeltons were able to afford a hotel room every night as they worked their way to Harwich Port.

==== "Doughnut Dunkers" ====
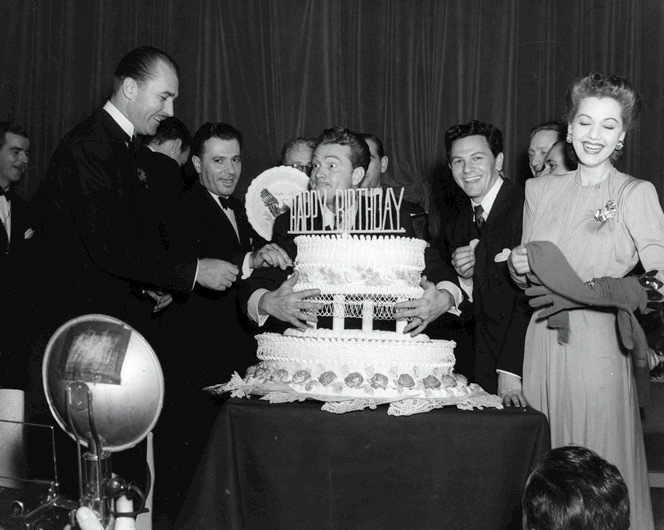
Skelton with John Garfield at the 1944 FDR Birthday Ball

Skelton and Edna worked for a year in Camden, New Jersey, and were able to get an engagement at Montreal's Lido Club in 1934 through a friend who managed the chorus lines at New York's Roxy Theatre. Despite an initial rocky start, the act was a success, and brought them more theater dates throughout Canada. (Note: Since much of Skelton's success had been in Canada at this point, many reviewers believed he was Canadian, calling him "a Canadian lad".)

Skelton's performances in Canada led to new opportunities and the inspiration for a new, innovative routine that brought him recognition in the years to come. While performing in Montreal, the Skeltons met Harry Anger, a vaudeville producer for New York City's Loew's State Theatre. Anger promised the pair a booking as a headlining act at Loew's, but they would need to come up with new material for the engagement. While the Skeltons were having breakfast in a Montreal diner, Edna had an idea for a new routine as she and Skelton observed the other patrons eating doughnuts and drinking coffee. They devised the "Doughnut Dunkers" routine, with Skelton's visual impressions of how different people ate doughnuts. (Note: Skelton copyrighted the original "Doughnut Dunkers" routine and every possible variation of it.) The skit won them the Loew's State engagement and a handsome fee.

The couple viewed the Loew's State engagement in 1937 as Skelton's big chance. They hired New York comedy writers to prepare material for the engagement, believing they needed more sophisticated jokes and skits than the routines Skelton normally performed. However, his New York audience did not laugh or applaud until Skelton abandoned the newly-written material and began performing the "Doughnut Dunkers" and his older routines. (Note: The problem with doing the "Doughnut Dunkers" skit was that Skelton had to eat nine doughnuts at every performance. He was performing five times a day and eating 45 doughnuts. He gained nearly 35 pounds, and had to shelve the routine until he lost some weight.) The doughnut-dunking routine also helped Skelton rise to celebrity status. In 1937, while he was entertaining at the Capitol Theater in Washington, D.C., President Franklin D. Roosevelt invited Skelton to perform at a White House luncheon. During one of the official toasts, Skelton grabbed Roosevelt's glass, saying, "Careful what you drink, Mr. President. I got rolled in a place like this once." His humor appealed to FDR and Skelton became the master of ceremonies for Roosevelt's official birthday celebration for many years afterward.

=== Film work ===
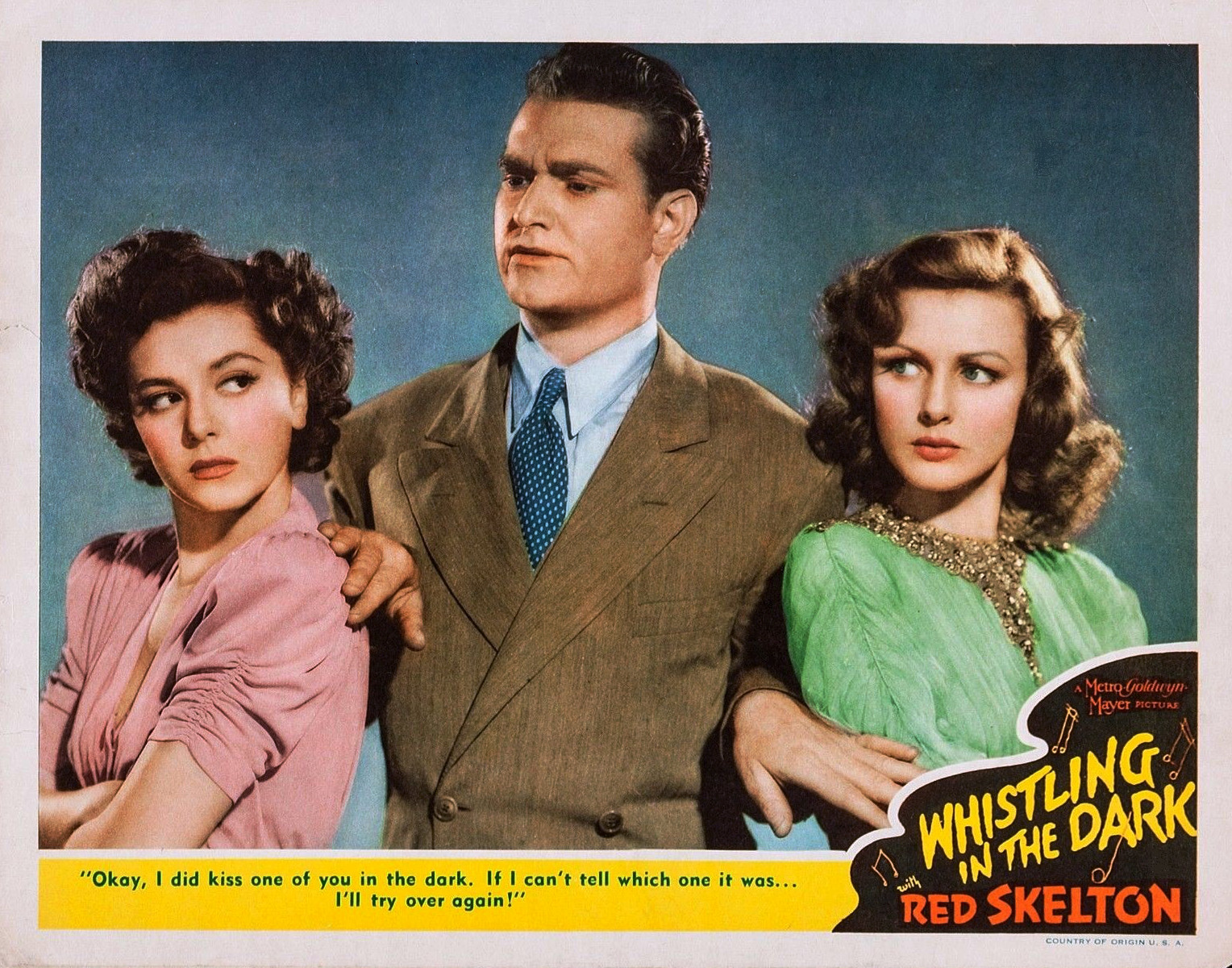
Skelton with Ann Rutherford and Virginia Grey as radio detective "The Fox" in Whistling in the Dark (1941)

Skelton's first contact with Hollywood came in the form of a failed 1932 screen test. In 1938, he made his film debut for RKO Pictures in the supporting role of a camp counselor in Having Wonderful Time. He appeared in two short subjects for Vitaphone in 1939: Seeing Red and The Broadway Buckaroo. Actor Mickey Rooney contacted Skelton, urging him to try for work in films after seeing him perform his "Doughnut Dunkers" act at President Roosevelt's 1940 birthday party. For his Metro-Goldwyn-Mayer (MGM) screen test, Skelton performed many of his more popular skits, such as "Guzzler's Gin", but added some impromptu pantomimes as the cameras were rolling. "Imitation of Movie Heroes Dying" were Skelton's impressions of the cinema deaths of stars such as George Raft, Edward G. Robinson, and James Cagney.

Skelton appeared in numerous films for MGM throughout the 1940s. In 1940, he provided comic relief as a lieutenant in Frank Borzage's war drama Flight Command, opposite Robert Taylor, Ruth Hussey, and Walter Pidgeon. In 1941, he also provided comic relief in Harold S. Bucquet's Dr. Kildare medical dramas, Dr. Kildare's Wedding Day and The People vs. Dr. Kildare. Skelton was soon starring in comedy features as inept radio detective "The Fox", the first of which was Whistling in the Dark (1941) in which he began working with director S. Sylvan Simon, who became his favorite director. He reprised the same role opposite Ann Rutherford in Simon's other pictures, including Whistling in Dixie (1942) and Whistling in Brooklyn (1943). In 1941, Skelton began appearing in musical comedies, starring opposite Eleanor Powell, Ann Sothern, and Robert Young in Norman Z. McLeod's Lady Be Good. In 1942, Skelton again starred opposite Eleanor Powell in Edward Buzzell's Ship Ahoy, and alongside Ann Sothern in McLeod's Panama Hattie.

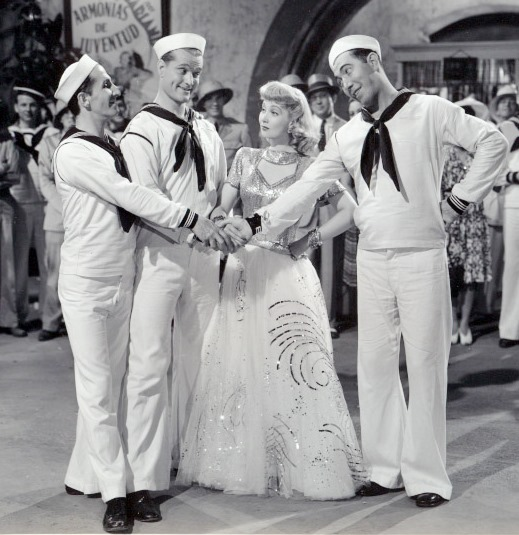
Skelton (center left) in Panama Hattie (1942)

In 1943, after a memorable role as a nightclub hatcheck attendant who becomes King Louis XV in a dream opposite Lucille Ball and Gene Kelly in Roy Del Ruth's Du Barry Was a Lady, Skelton starred as Joseph Rivington Reynolds, a hotel valet besotted with Broadway starlet Constance Shaw (Powell) in Vincente Minnelli's romantic musical comedy, I Dood It. The film was largely a remake of Buster Keaton's Spite Marriage; Keaton, who had become a comedy consultant to MGM after his film career had diminished, began coaching Skelton on set during the filming. Keaton worked in this capacity on several of Skelton's films, and his 1926 film The General was also later rewritten to become Skelton's A Southern Yankee (1948), under directors S. Sylvan Simon and Edward Sedgwick. Keaton was so convinced of Skelton's comedic talent that he approached MGM studio head Louis B. Mayer with a request to create a small company within MGM for himself and Skelton, where the two could work on film projects. Keaton offered to forgo his salary if the films made by the company were not box-office hits; Mayer declined the request.

In 1944, Skelton starred opposite Esther Williams in George Sidney's musical comedy Bathing Beauty, playing a songwriter with romantic difficulties. He next had a relatively minor role as a "TV announcer who, in the course of demonstrating a brand of gin, progresses from mild inebriation through messy drunkenness to full-blown stupor" in the "When Television Comes" segment of Ziegfeld Follies, which featured William Powell and Judy Garland in the main roles. This was actually his "Guzzler's Gin" routine, written by Edna, which Skelton had been performing since 1940. In 1946, Skelton played boastful clerk J. Aubrey Piper opposite Marilyn Maxwell and Marjorie Main in Harry Beaumont's comedy picture The Show-Off.

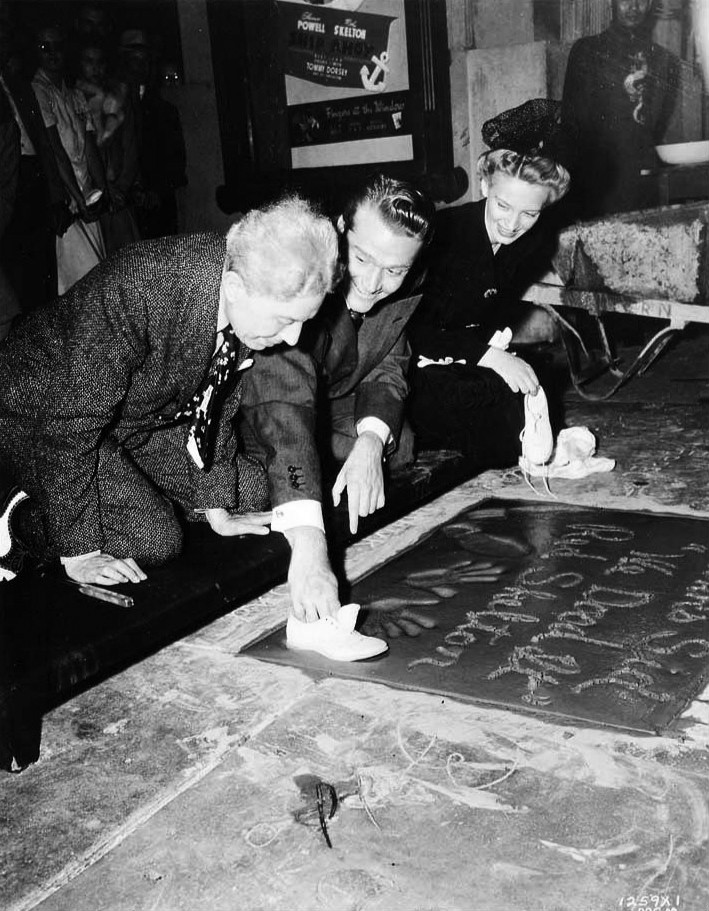
Skelton's imprint ceremony at Grauman's Chinese Theatre, June 18, 1942: His wife, Edna, is on his left. Skelton also imprinted "Junior's" shoes along with the message, "We Dood It!". Theater owner Sid Grauman is in foreground of photo.

Skelton's contract called for MGM's approval prior to his radio shows and other appearances. When he renegotiated his long-term contract with MGM, he wanted a clause that permitted him to remain working in radio and to be able to work on television, which was then largely experimental. At the time, the major work in the medium was centered in New York; Skelton had worked there for some time, and was able to determine that he would find success with his physical comedy through the medium. (Note: Examples of pre-World War II television programming from WNBT, New York; the station is known as WNBC today.) By 1947, Skelton's work interests were focused not on films, but on radio and television. His MGM contract was rigid enough to require the studio's written consent for his weekly radio shows, as well as any benefit or similar appearances he made; radio offered fewer restrictions, more creative control, and a higher salary. Skelton asked for a release from MGM after learning he could not raise the $750,000 needed to buy out the remainder of his contract. He also voiced frustration while on the set of The Fuller Brush Man with the film scripts he was offered, saying, "Movies are not my field. Radio and television are." (Note: Keaton became frustrated because of Skelton's focus on his radio program, while Skelton wanted better film scripts. Gehring quotes Skelton's movies vs radio and television statement while on the set of The Fuller Brush Man as, "Movies are not my friend. Radio and television are." In a 1948 interview, Skelton explained that his MGM salary was $2,000 weekly and that his radio salary was $8,000 per week. The cost of answering his MGM fan mail was billed to Skelton. When Skelton agreed to make appearances approved by MGM, he did not receive the fee for his work; it went to MGM, which continued to pay him the contracted $2,000 per week. Since Skelton's radio program participation was noted in his MGM contract, his radio show salary went to him and not to MGM.) He did not receive the desired television clause nor a release from his MGM contract. In 1948, columnist Sheilah Graham printed that Skelton's wishes were to make only one film a year, spending the rest of the time traveling the U.S. with his radio show.

Skelton's ability to successfully ad lib often meant that the way the script was written was not always the way it was recorded on film. Some directors were delighted with the creativity, but others were often frustrated by it. (Note: Director Jack Donahue, who directed Watch the Birdie, commented about Skelton's tendency to ad lib, "God help us all. If he manages to say it in English, write it down and we'll use it.") S. Sylvan Simon, who became a close friend, allowed Skelton free rein when directing him. MGM became annoyed with Simon during the filming of The Fuller Brush Man, as the studio contended that Skelton should have been playing romantic leads instead of performing slapstick. Simon and MGM parted company when he was not asked to direct retakes of Skelton's A Southern Yankee; Simon asked that his name be removed from the film's credits.

Skelton was willing to negotiate with MGM to extend the agreement provided he would receive the right to pursue television. This time, the studio was willing to grant it, making Skelton the only major MGM personality with the privilege. The 1950 negotiations allowed him to begin working in television beginning September 30, 1951. He went on to appear in films such as Jack Donohue's The Yellow Cab Man (1950), Roy Rowland and Buster Keaton's Excuse My Dust (1951), Charles Walters' Texas Carnival (1951), Mervyn LeRoy's Lovely to Look At (1952), Robert Z. Leonard's The Clown (1953), and The Great Diamond Robbery (1954), and Norman Z. McLeod's poorly received Public Pigeon No. 1 (1957), his last major film role, which originated incidentally from an episode of the television anthology series Climax!. In a 1956 interview, he said he would never work simultaneously in all three media again. As a result, Skelton would make only a few appearances in films after this, including playing a saloon drunk in Around the World in Eighty Days (1956), a fictional version of himself as a gambler in Ocean's 11 (1960), and a Neanderthal man in Those Magnificent Men in Their Flying Machines (1965).

=== Radio, divorce, and remarriage (1937–1951) ===
Performing the "Doughnut Dunkers" routine led to Skelton's first appearance on Rudy Vallée's The Fleischmann's Yeast Hour on August 12, 1937. Vallée's program had a talent-show segment, and those who were searching for stardom were eager to be heard on it. Vallée also booked veteran comic and fellow Indiana native Joe Cook to appear as a guest with Skelton. The two Hoosiers proceeded to trade jokes about their home towns, with Skelton contending to Cook, an Evansville native, that the city was a suburb of Vincennes. The show received enough fan mail after the performance to invite both comedians back two weeks after Skelton's initial appearance and again in November of that year.

On October 1, 1938, Skelton replaced Red Foley as the host of Avalon Time on NBC; Edna also joined the show's cast, under her maiden name. (Note: Avalon Time was broadcast from WLW in Cincinnati; during the time Skelton was part of the program, Edna and he traveled from Chicago to do the weekly show.) She developed a system for working with the show's writers – selecting material from them, adding her own, and filing the unused bits and lines for future use; the Skeltons worked on Avalon Time until late 1939. Skelton's work in films led to a new regular radio-show offer; between films, he promoted himself and MGM by appearing without charge at Los Angeles-area banquets. A radio advertising agent was a guest at one of his banquet performances and recommended Skelton to one of his clients.

Skelton went on the air with his own radio show, The Raleigh Cigarette Program, on October 7, 1941. The bandleader for the show was Ozzie Nelson; his wife, Harriet, who worked under her maiden name of Hilliard, was the show's vocalist and also worked with Skelton in skits.

==== "I dood it!" ====
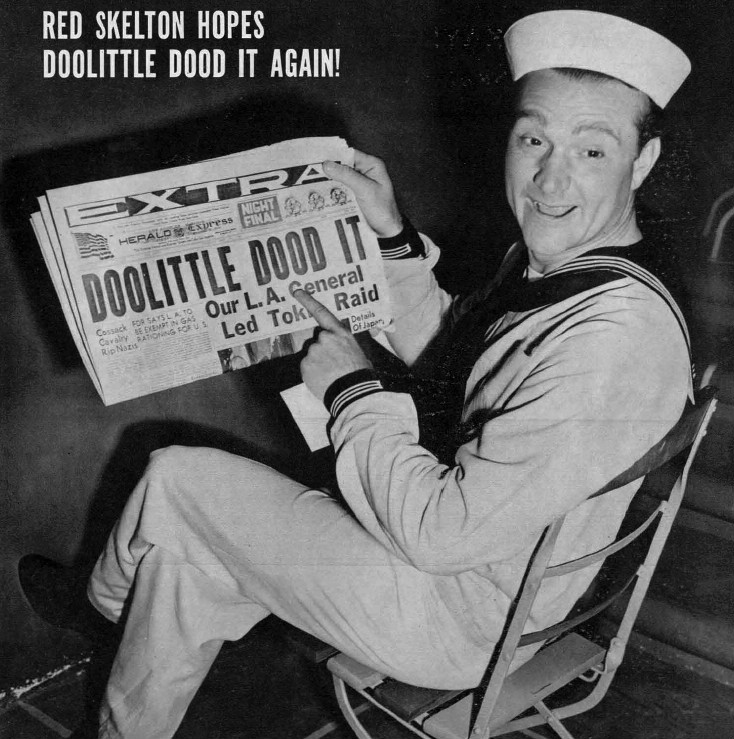
Skelton with "Doolittle Dood It" newspaper headline, 1942

Skelton introduced the first two of his many characters during The Raleigh Cigarette Program's first season. The character of Clem Kadiddlehopper was based on a Vincennes neighbor named Carl Hopper, who was hard of hearing. (Note: Carl Hopper was a contemporary and a boyhood friend of Skelton's. Hopper, who was hearing-impaired, was often ridiculed or shunned because of his hearing problem. As a boy, Skelton made it a point to include Hopper in the activities of his childhood in Vincennes.) After the cartoon character Bullwinkle was introduced, Skelton contemplated filing a lawsuit against Bill Scott, who voiced the cartoon moose, because he found it similar to his voice pattern for Clem.

The second character, the Mean Widdle Kid, or "Junior", was a young boy full of mischief, who typically did things he was told not to do. "Junior" would say things like, "If I dood it, I gets a whipping.", followed moments later by the statement, "I dood it!" Skelton performed the character at home with Edna, giving him the nickname "Junior" long before it was heard by a radio audience. While the phrase was Skelton's, the idea of using the character on the radio show was Edna's. Skelton starred in a 1943 movie of the same title, but did not play "Junior" in the film.

The phrase was such a part of national culture at the time that, when General Doolittle conducted the bombing of Tokyo in 1942, many newspapers used the phrase "Doolittle Dood It" as a headline. After a talk with President Roosevelt in 1943, Skelton used his radio show to collect funds for a Douglas A-20 Havoc to be given to the Soviet Army to help fight World War II. Asking children to send in their spare change, he raised enough money for the aircraft in two weeks; he named the bomber "We Dood It!" In 1986, Soviet newspaper Pravda offered praise to Skelton for his 1943 gift, and in 1993, the pilot of the plane was able to meet Skelton and thank him for the bomber. (Note: At their 1993 meeting, the former Soviet bomber pilot told Skelton that he would have thanked him for the bomber some time ago, but a U.S. diplomat had told him that Skelton was dead.)

Skelton also added a routine he had been performing since 1928. Originally called "Mellow Cigars", the skit was about an announcer who became ill as he smoked his sponsor's product. Brown and Williamson, the makers of cigarettes, asked Skelton to change some aspects of the skit; he renamed the routine "Guzzler's Gin", where the announcer became inebriated while sampling and touting the imaginary sponsor's wares. While the traditional radio program called for its cast to do an audience warm-up in preparation for the broadcast, Skelton did just the opposite. After the regular radio program had ended, the show's audience was treated to a post-program performance. He then performed his "Guzzler's Gin" or any of more than 350 routines for those who had come to the radio show. He updated and revised his post-show routines as diligently as those for his radio program. As a result, studio audience tickets for Skelton's radio show were in high demand; at times, up to 300 people had to be turned away for lack of seats.

==== Divorce from Edna, marriage to Georgia ====
In 1942, Edna announced that she was leaving Skelton, but would continue to manage his career and write material for him. He did not realize she was serious until Edna issued a statement about the impending divorce through NBC. They were divorced in 1943, leaving the courtroom arm in arm. The couple did not discuss the reasons for their divorce, and Edna initially prepared to work as a script writer for other radio programs. When the divorce was finalized, she went to New York, leaving her former husband three fully-prepared show scripts. Skelton and those associated with him sent telegrams and called her, asking her to come back to him in a professional capacity. (Note: The couple cared deeply for each other, but, for reasons known best to them both, could have a successful professional relationship but not a marriage. Skelton can be seen in the film Whistling in the Dark dancing with one of his female co-stars with his fingers crossed. In a 1942 interview, he explained the reason for this, saying he only loved Edna and when he did romantic film scenes, he always crossed his fingers to indicate that the screen emotion was not real. After his engagement to actress Muriel Morris ended, Skelton tried to persuade Edna to remarry him; he was not successful.)

Edna remained the manager of the couple's funds because Skelton spent money too easily. An attempt at managing his own checking account that began with a $5,000 balance, ended five days later after a call to Edna saying the account was overdrawn. Skelton had a weekly allowance of $75, with Edna making investments for him, choosing real estate and other relatively-stable assets. She remained an advisor on his career until 1952, receiving a generous weekly salary for life for her efforts.

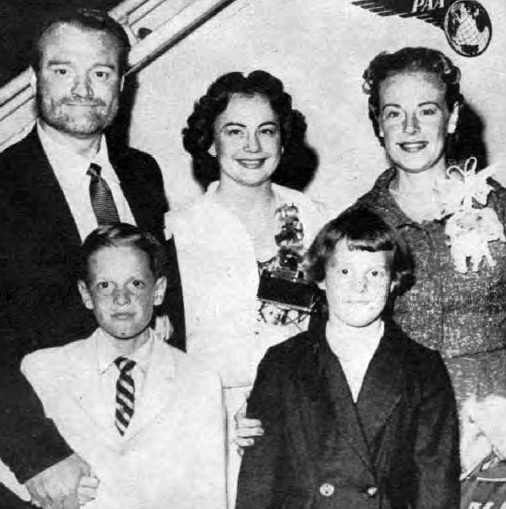
The Skeltons, circa 1957: Back from left: Red, wife Georgia, sister-in-law Maxine Davis, front: Son Richard and daughter Valentina

The divorce meant that Skelton had lost his married man's deferment; he was once again classified as 1-A for service. He was drafted into the Army in early 1944; both MGM and his radio sponsor tried to obtain a deferment for the comedian, but to no avail. His last Raleigh radio show was on June 6, 1944, the day before he was formally inducted as a private; he was not assigned to Special Services at that time. Without its star, the program was discontinued, and the opportunity presented itself for the Nelsons to begin a radio show of their own, The Adventures of Ozzie and Harriet.

By 1944, Skelton was engaged to actress Muriel Morris, who was also known as Muriel Chase; the couple had obtained a marriage license and told the press they intended to marry within a few days. At the last minute, the actress decided not to marry him, initially saying she intended to marry a wealthy businessman in Mexico City. She later recanted the story about marrying the businessman, but continued to say that her relationship with Skelton was over. The actress further denied that the reason for the breakup was Edna's continuing to manage her ex-husband's career; Edna stated that she had no intention of either getting in the middle of the relationship or reconciling with her former husband.

He was on army furlough for throat discomfort when he married actress Georgia Maureen Davis in Beverly Hills, California, on March 9, 1945; the couple met on the MGM lot. (Note: Skelton later referred to Georgia as "Little Red". Some evidence indicates that Skelton also referred to Edna Skelton by this nickname. A sketch by Skelton has a plaque reading "Red Skelton sketch of Wife Edna Skelton". The original is at the Red Skelton Museum Foundation in Vincennes, Indiana.) Skelton traveled to Los Angeles from the eastern army base where he was assigned for the wedding. He knew he would possibly be assigned overseas soon, and wanted the marriage to take place first. After the wedding, he entered the hospital to have his tonsils removed. The couple had two children; Valentina, a daughter, was born May 5, 1947, and a son, Richard, was born May 20, 1948.

==== A cast of characters ====
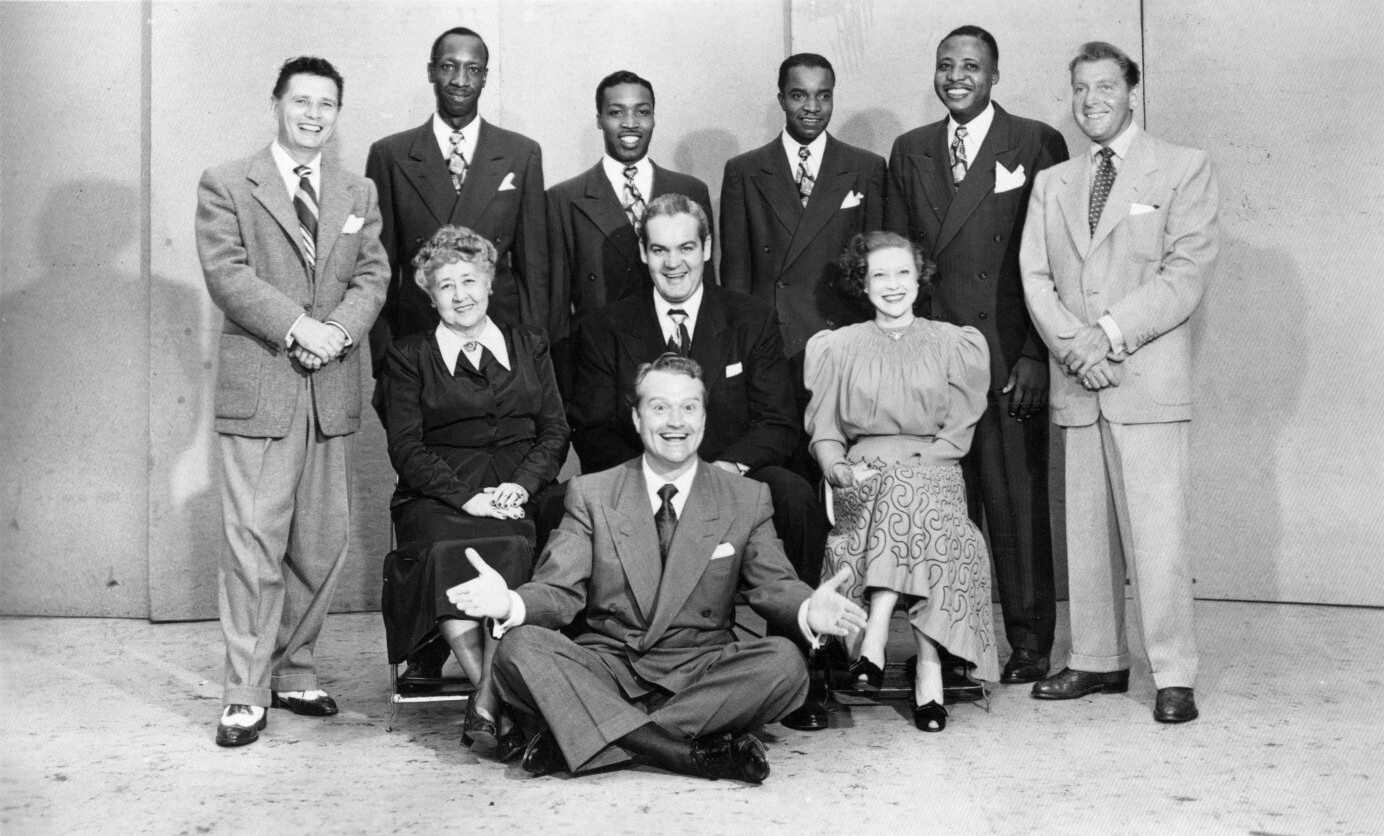
Photo of 1948 Raleigh Cigarette Program cast: Standing: Pat McGeehan, The Four Knights, David Rose (orchestra leader). Seated: Verna Felton ("Grandma" to Skelton's "Junior" character), Rod O'Connor (announcer), Lurene Tuttle ("Mother" to Skelton's "Junior" character). Front: Skelton

Skelton served in the United States Army during World War II, initially with the field artillery at Camp Roberts, California, and Camp Ord with the double duty of entertaining soldiers. After being assigned to the Special Services, Skelton performed as many as 12 shows per day before troops in both the United States and in Europe. The pressure of his workload caused him to suffer exhaustion and a nervous breakdown, following which he developed a stutter. While recovering at an army hospital at Camp Pickett, Virginia, he met a soldier who had been severely wounded and was not expected to survive. Skelton devoted a lot of time and effort to trying to make the man laugh. As a result of this effort, his stutter reduced; his army friend's condition also improved, and he was no longer on the critical list. He was released from his army duties in September 1945. "I've been told I'm the only celebrity who entered the Army as a private and came out a private," he told reporters. His sponsor was eager to have him back on the air, and Skelton's program began anew on NBC on December 4, 1945.

Upon returning to radio, Skelton brought with him many new characters that were added to his repertoire: Bolivar Shagnasty, described as a "loudmouthed braggart"; Cauliflower McPugg, a boxer; Deadeye, a cowboy; Willie Lump-Lump, a fellow who drank too much; and San Fernando Red, a confidence man with political aspirations. By 1947, Skelton's musical conductor was David Rose, who went on to television with him; he had worked with Rose during his time in the Army and wanted Rose to join him on the radio show when it went back on the air.

On April 22, 1947, Skelton was censored by NBC two minutes into his radio show. When his announcer Rod O'Connor and he began talking about Fred Allen being censored the previous week, they were silenced for 15 seconds; comedian Bob Hope was given the same treatment once he began referring to the censoring of Allen. (Note: Fred Allen was censored when he referred to an imaginary NBC vice president who was "in charge of program ends". He went on to explain to his audience that this vice president saved these hours, minutes, and seconds that radio programs ran over their allotted time until he had two weeks' worth of them and then used the time for a two-week vacation.) Skelton forged on with his lines for his studio audience's benefit; the material he insisted on using had been edited from the script by the network before the broadcast. He had been briefly censored the previous month for the use of the word "diaper". After the April incidents, NBC indicated it would no longer pull the plug for similar reasons.

Skelton changed sponsors in 1948; Brown & Williamson, owners of Raleigh cigarettes, withdrew due to program production costs. His new sponsor was Procter & Gamble's Tide laundry detergent. The next year, he changed networks, going from NBC to CBS, where his radio show aired until May 1953. After his network radio contract was over, he signed a three-year contract with Ziv Radio for a syndicated radio program in 1954. His syndicated radio program was offered as a daily show; it included segments of his older network radio programs, and new material done for the syndication. He was able to use portions of his older radio shows because he owned the rights for rebroadcasting them.

=== Television (1951–1970) ===
Skelton was unable to work in television until the end of his 1951 MGM movie contract; in renegotiating to extend that pact MGM agreed to allow him to go on the air, but only on or after September 30, 1951. On May 4, 1951, he signed a contract for television with NBC; Procter and Gamble was his sponsor. He said he would be performing the same characters on television that he had been doing on radio.

His television debut, The Red Skelton Show, premiered on September 30, 1951. At the end of his opening monolog, two men backstage grabbed his ankles from behind the set curtain, hauling him offstage face down. (Note: The comedic hard knocks took their toll; before Skelton had reached the age of 40, he needed leg braces and a cane for the cartilage that was destroyed in both of his knees.) A 1943 instrumental hit by David Rose, called "Holiday for Strings", became Skelton's TV theme song. The move to television allowed him to create two nonhuman characters, seagulls Gertrude and Heathcliffe, which he performed while the pair were flying by, tucking his thumbs under his arms to represent wings and shaping his hat to look like a bird's bill. He patterned his meek, henpecked television character of George Appleby after his radio character, J. Newton Numbskull, who had similar characteristics. (Note: After the death of Richard, Skelton performed the George Appleby character wearing his son's eyeglasses.) His "Freddie the Freeloader" clown was introduced on the program in 1952, with Skelton copying his father's makeup for the character. (He learned how to duplicate his father's makeup and perform his routines through his mother's recollections.) A ritual was established for the end of every program, with Skelton's shy, boyish wave and words of "Good night and may God bless." (Note: Skelton's original sign-off phrase was "God bless". When he came to believe it appeared he was commanding something of God, he added the word "may" to the sign-off. In a 1978 interview, Skelton was asked about his frequent use of the phrase. His answer was "I say 'may God bless' to people because I want them to find the same happiness I've found. After all, God is good." In 1982, he was being interviewed in Wilmington, North Carolina, and declined a cameraman's request for a posed shot of him waving and saying the phrase. Skelton's explanation was that he felt doing it in this way would make it not genuine. "I don't use it as a gimmick. I mean it from the bottom of my heart.")

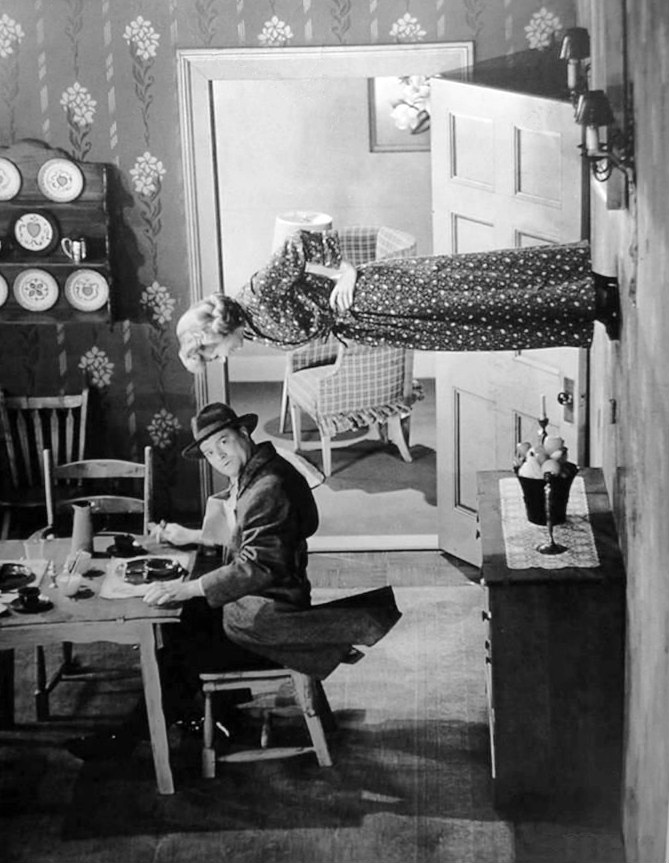
Skelton as Willie Lump-Lump and Shirley Mitchell as his wife, who appears to be walking on the wall in a 1952 Skelton show sketch

During the 1951–1952 season, the program was broadcast from a converted NBC radio studio. The first year of the television show was done live; this led to problems, because not enough time was available for costume changes; Skelton was on camera for most of the half-hour, including the delivery of a commercial that was written into one of the show's skits. In early 1952, Skelton had an idea for a television sketch about someone who had been drinking not knowing which way is up. The script was completed, and he had the show's production crew build a set that was perpendicular to the stage, so it would give the illusion that someone was walking on walls. The skit, starring his character Willie Lump-Lump, called for the character's wife to hire a carpenter to redo the living room in an effort to teach her husband a lesson about his drinking. When Willie wakes up there after a night of drinking, he is misled into believing he is not lying on the floor, but on the living room wall. Willie's wife goes about the house normally, but to Willie, she appears to be walking on a wall. Within an hour after the broadcast, the NBC switchboard had received 350 calls regarding the show, and Skelton had received more than 2,500 letters about the skit within a week of its airing.

Skelton was delivering an intense performance live each week, and the strain showed in physical illness. In 1952, he was drinking heavily due to the constant physical pain of a diaphragmatic hernia and the emotional distress of marital problems. He thought about divorcing Georgia. (Note: Skelton had to be given oxygen to complete one of his live television programs in June 1952; his doctors ordered him to take a rest from all performing after his television show schedule ended later in the month.) NBC agreed to film his shows in the 1952–1953 season at Eagle Lion Studios, next to the Sam Goldwyn Studio, on Santa Monica Boulevard in Hollywood. Later, the show was moved to the new NBC television studios in Burbank. Procter and Gamble was unhappy with the filming of the television show, and insisted that Skelton return to live broadcasts. The situation made him think about leaving television. Declining ratings prompted sponsor Procter & Gamble to cancel his show in the spring of 1953. Skelton announced that any of his future television programs would be variety shows, where he would not have the almost constant burden of performing. Beginning with the 1953–1954 season, he switched to CBS, where he remained until 1970.

For the initial move to CBS, he had no sponsor. The network gambled by covering all expenses for the program on a sustaining basis: His first CBS sponsor was Geritol. He curtailed his drinking and his ratings at CBS began to improve, especially after he began appearing on Tuesday nights for co-sponsors Johnson's Wax and Pet Milk Company.

By 1955, Skelton was broadcasting some of his weekly programs in color, which he did about 100 times between 1955 and 1960. He tried to encourage CBS to do other shows in color at the facility, but CBS mostly avoided color broadcasting after the network's television-set manufacturing division was discontinued in 1951. (Note: See Color television for a more complete treatment of the CBS color issue.) By 1959, Skelton was the only comedian with a weekly variety television show. Others who remained on the air, such as Danny Thomas, were performing their routines as part of situation comedy programs. He performed a preview show for a studio audience on Mondays, using their reactions to determine which skits required editing for the Tuesday program. For the Tuesday afternoon run-through prior to the actual show, he ignored the script for the most part, ad-libbing through it at will. The run-through was well attended by CBS Television City employees. Sometimes during live telecasts and taped programs, Skelton would break up or cause his guest stars to laugh. (Note: One of his former writers called the laughter a "survival technique"; the script was on the floor out of camera range, and this was where one looked when a line was forgotten. Skelton also appeared to enjoy his material as much as his audience did. While breaking into laughter during a story in a live performance, Skelton tried to apologize by saying "I know what's coming!") Mark Evanier wrote about attending a Skelton rehearsal: "He was supposed to be rehearsing the show they'd tape the next day and he did a little of that…but mostly, his aim was to break up his co-stars, his crew and an audience largely made up of studio personnel. It was dirty joke after dirty joke after dirty joke and I couldn't understand how that helped them get a show taped. One of Skelton's writers (Martin A. Ragaway) told me, 'It was just something Red needed to get out of his system before he could focus on the actual script.'"

==== Richard's illness and death ====
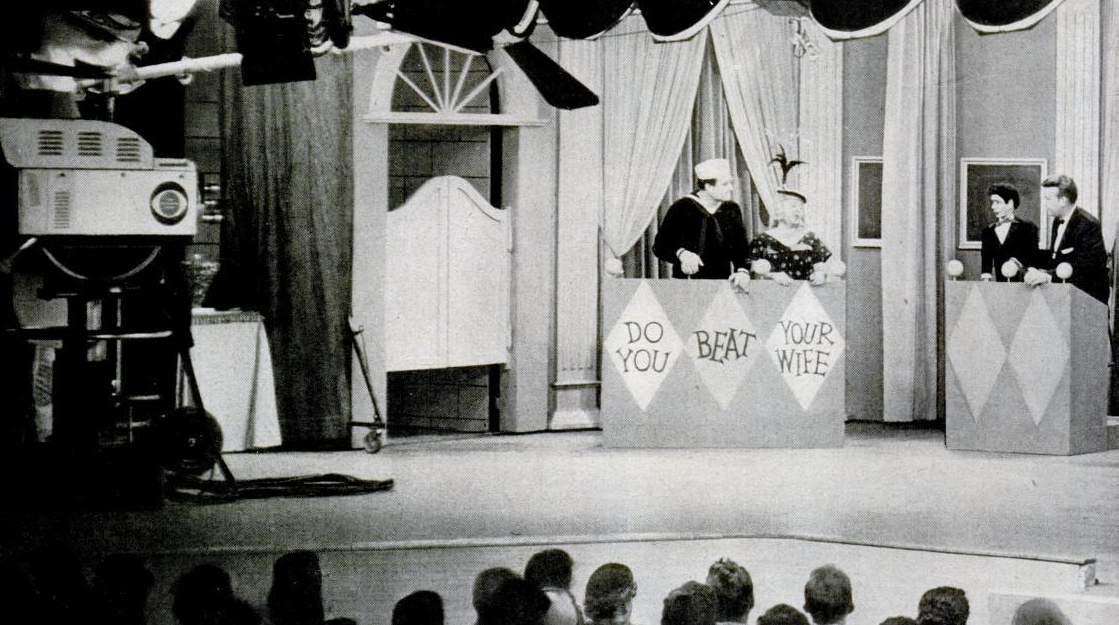
Skelton and Mickey Rooney at dress rehearsal for The Red Skelton Show of January 15, 1957: Skelton as a sailor and Rooney as his wife play contestants on a parody of Do You Trust Your Wife?. This was Skelton's return to television after his son Richard's leukemia diagnosis.

At the height of Skelton's popularity, his 9-year-old son Richard was diagnosed with leukemia and was given a year to live. While the network told him to take as much time off as necessary, Skelton felt that unless he went back to his television show, he would be unable to be at ease and make his son's life a happy one. He returned to his television show on January 15, 1957, with guest star Mickey Rooney helping to lift his spirits. In happier times, he had frequently mentioned his children on his program, but he found it extremely difficult to do this after Richard became ill. Skelton resumed this practice only after his son asked him to do so. After his son's diagnosis, Skelton took his family on an extended trip, so Richard could see as much of the world as possible. The Skeltons had an audience with Pope Pius XII on July 22, 1957. According to an International News Service article that appeared in the August 1, 1957, issue of the St.Joseph, Missouri News Press, Richard said that the audience with the Pope was the high point of the trip so far. The Skeltons cut their travels short and returned to the United States after an encounter with an aggressive reporter in London and relentlessly negative reports in British newspapers.

The Skelton family received support from CBS management and from the public following the announcement of Richard's illness. In November, Skelton fell down stairs and injured an ankle, and he nearly died after a "cardiac-asthma" attack on December 30, 1957. He was taken to St. John's Hospital in Santa Monica, where, his doctors said, "if there were ten steps to death, Red Skelton had taken nine of them by the time he had arrived". Skelton later said he was working on some notes for television and the next thing he remembered, he was in a hospital bed; he did not know how serious his illness was until he read about it himself in the newspapers. His illness and recovery kept him off the air for a full month; Skelton returned to his television show on January 28, 1958.

Richard died on May 10, 1958, 10 days before his 10th birthday. Skelton was scheduled to appear on his weekly television show on the day his son was buried. Though recordings of some older programs were available that the network could have run, he asked that guest performers be used instead. His friends in the television, film and music industries organized The Friends Of Red Skelton Variety Show, which they performed to replace The Red Skelton Show for that week; by May 27, 1958, Skelton had returned to his program. Richard's death had a profound effect on the family. Life magazine, profiling "The Invincible Red" on April 21, 1961, observed that Skelton was still "racked [sic]" by his son's death. In 1962, the Skelton family moved to Palm Springs, and Skelton used the Bel Air home only on the two days a week when he was in Los Angeles for his television show taping.

==== The Red Skelton Hour ====
In early 1960, Skelton purchased the old Charlie Chaplin Studios and updated it for videotape recording. With a recently purchased three-truck mobile color television unit, he recorded a number of his series episodes and specials in color. Even with his color facilities, CBS discontinued color broadcasts on a regular basis and Skelton shortly thereafter sold the studio to CBS and the mobile unit to local station KTLA. (Note: Photo of Skelton's color television mobile unit) Prior to this, he had been filming at Desilu Productions. Skelton then moved back to the network's Television City facilities, where he taped his programs until he left the network. In the fall of 1962, CBS expanded his program to a full hour, retitling it The Red Skelton Hour. Although it was a staple of his radio programs, he did not perform his "Junior" character on television until 1962, after extending the length of his program.

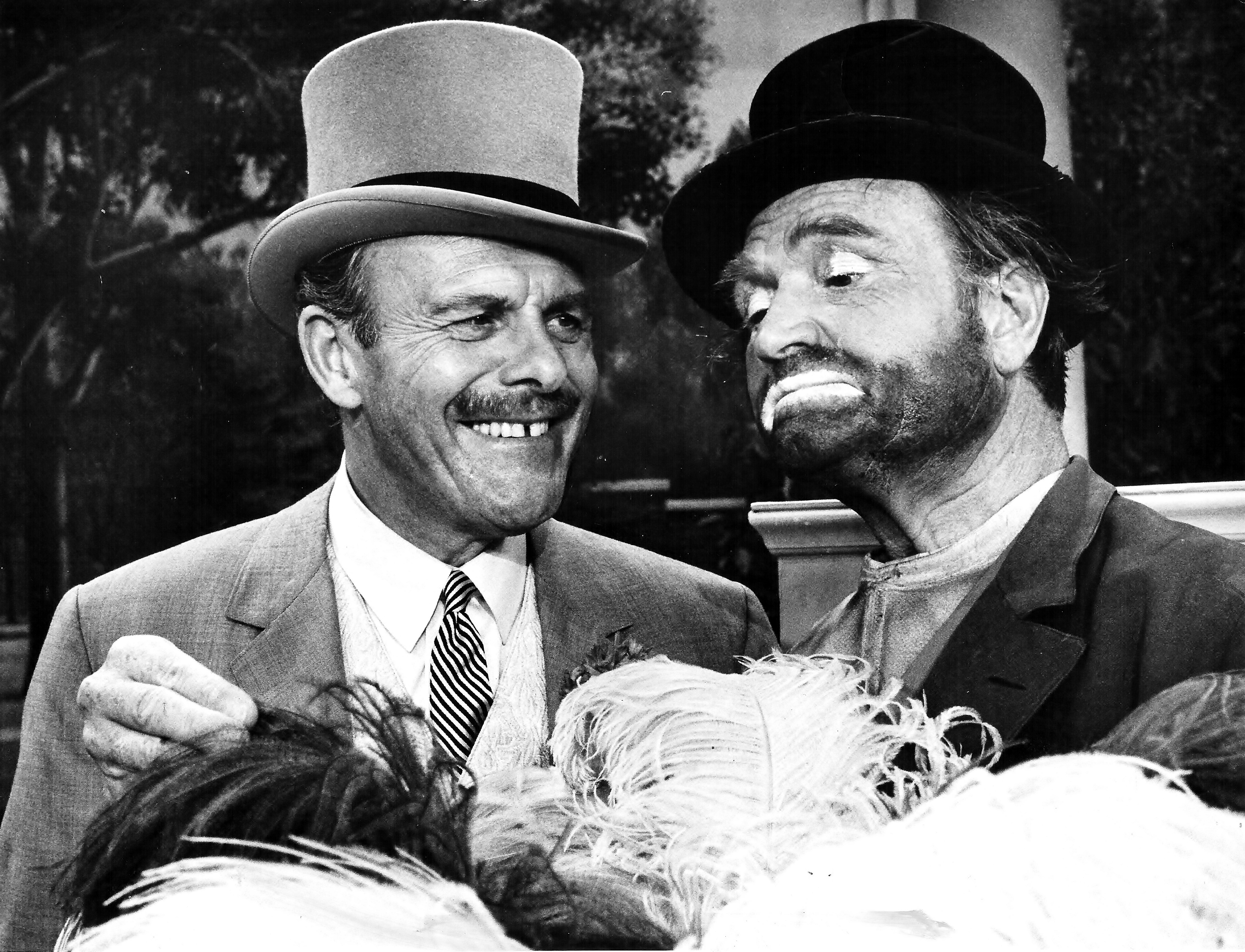
Skelton as Freddie the Freeloader (right) and Terry-Thomas

Skelton frequently employed the art of pantomime for his characters; a segment of his weekly program was called the "Silent Spot". He attributed his liking for pantomime and for using few props to the early days when he did not want to have a lot of luggage. He explained that having the right hat was the key to getting into character.

Skelton's season premiere for the 1960–1961 television season was a tribute to the United Nations. About 600 people from the organization, including diplomats, were invited to be part of the audience for the show. The program was entirely done in pantomime, as UN representatives from 39 nations were in the studio audience. One of the sketches he performed for the UN was that of the old man watching the parade. The sketch had its origins in a question Skelton's son, Richard, asked his father about what happens when people die. He told his son, "They join a parade and start marching." In 1965, Skelton did another show completely in pantomime. This time, he was joined by Marcel Marceau; the two artists alternated performances for the hour-long program, sharing the stage to perform Pinocchio. The only person who spoke during the hour was Maurice Chevalier, who served as the show's narrator.

In 1969, Skelton wrote and performed a monologue about the Pledge of Allegiance. In the speech, he commented on the meaning of each phrase of the pledge. He credited one of his Vincennes grammar-school teachers, Mr. Laswell, with the original speech. (Note: Columnist Hy Gardner requested a copy of Skelton's "Pledge of Allegiance" speech. Skelton sent him a copy of the monologue and granted permission for Gardner to print it in its entirety in his column.) The teacher had grown tired of hearing his students monotonously recite the pledge each morning; he then demonstrated to them how it should be recited, along with comments about the meaning behind each phrase. CBS received 200,000 requests for copies; the company subsequently released the monologue as a single on Columbia Records. A year later, he performed the monolog for President Richard Nixon at the first "Evening at the White House", a series of entertainment events honoring the recently inaugurated president.

=== Off the air and bitterness (1970–1983) ===
As the 1970s began, the networks began a major campaign to discontinue long-running shows that they considered stale, dominated by older demographics, and/or becoming too expensive due to escalating costs. Despite Skelton's continued strong overall viewership, CBS saw his show as fitting into this category and canceled the program along with other comedy and variety shows hosted by veterans such as Jackie Gleason and Ed Sullivan. Performing in Las Vegas when he got the news of his CBS cancellation, Skelton said, "My heart has been broken." His program had been one of the top-10, highest-rated shows for 17 of the 20 years he was on television.

Skelton moved to NBC in 1970 in a half-hour Monday-night version of his former show. Its cancellation after one season ended his television career, and he returned to live performances. In an effort to prove the networks wrong, he performed frequently at colleges and proved popular with the audiences. Skelton was bitter about CBS's cancellation for many years afterwards. Believing the demographic and salary issues to be irrelevant, he accused CBS of bowing to the antiestablishment, antiwar faction at the height of the Vietnam War, saying his conservative political and social views caused the network to turn against him. (Note: Skelton also offered another reason for his CBS show's cancellation – that the network had asked Jackie Gleason and him to shift their family-oriented comedy toward racier scripts, and that both had turned them down.) He had invited prominent Republicans, including Vice President Spiro Agnew and Senate Republican Minority Leader Everett Dirksen, one of the Senate's strongest supporters of the war, to appear on his program. (Note: Dirksen, who had a narrative hit record, Gallant Men, appeared on Skelton's CBS show on April 18, 1967. His Gallant Men had won the 1967 Grammy for Best Spoken Word, Documentary or Drama Recording.) (Note: Agnew was a special guest and introduced Skelton on the premiere of his NBC Television show on September 14, 1970.)

Personal, as well as professional, changes occurred in Skelton's life at this time. He divorced Georgia in 1971 and married Lothian Toland, daughter of cinematographer Gregg Toland, on October 7, 1973. While he disassociated himself from television soon after his show was canceled, his bitterness had subsided enough for him to appear on The Tonight Show Starring Johnny Carson on July 11, 1975; it was his first television appearance since the cancellation of his television program. (Johnny Carson, one of his former writers, began his rise to network television prominence when he substituted for Skelton after a dress rehearsal injury in 1954.) (Note: When Skelton was injured during a rehearsal and admitted to a hospital, the live television program had lost its star two hours before its scheduled air time. Carson was selected to fill in for Skelton and earned the praise of television writers for his impromptu work. This was the beginning of Carson's career as a network television performer.) Skelton was also a guest on The Merv Griffin Show in October of the same year. Hopes he may have had that he could ease back into television through the talk-show circuit were ended on May 10, 1976, when Georgia Skelton committed suicide by gunshot on the 18th anniversary of Richard Skelton's death. (Note: In 1966, Georgia Skelton was wounded in a shooting at the Sands Hotel in Las Vegas while her husband was performing in the main showroom. Valentina Skelton and her boyfriend heard the gunshot; Georgia was found in the bedroom, surprised and confused about what had happened. Georgia did not feel safe without a gun and the couple brought it to Las Vegas with them. The Clark County Sheriff declared the shooting to be accidental. Gehring refers to Georgia's shooting in Las Vegas as a suicide attempt in an interview with Valentina Skelton.) Georgia was 54 and had been in poor health for some time. He put all professional activities on hold for some months as he mourned his former wife's death. Despite his anger at CBS, Skelton participated in the CBS 50th anniversary specials in April and May 1978.

Skelton made plans in 1977 to sell the rights to his old television programs as part of a package that would bring him back to regular television appearances. The package called for him to produce one new television show for every three older episodes; this did not materialize. In 1980, he was taken to court by 13 of his former writers over a report that his will called for the destruction of recordings of all his old television shows upon his death. (Note: The People magazine story goes on to say that Skelton was willing to reconsider his call for the destruction of all recordings of his television show, if an arrangement could be made to distribute them to home video only.) Skelton contended his remarks were made at a time when he was very unhappy with the television industry and were taken out of context. He said at the time, "Would you burn the only monument you've built in over 20 years?" As the owner of the television shows, Skelton initially refused to allow them to be syndicated as reruns during his lifetime. (Note: Skelton used a pseudonym of Victor van Bernard for his television performances, and named his television production company Van Bernard Productions.) In 1983, Group W announced that it had come to terms with him for the rights to rebroadcast some of his original television programs from 1966 through 1970; some of his earlier shows were made available after Skelton's death.

=== Red Skelton onstage ===
Skelton's 70-year career as an entertainer began as a stage performer. He retained a fondness for theaters, and referred to them as "palaces"; he also likened them to his "living room", where he would privately entertain guests. At the end of a performance, he would look at the empty stage where there was now no laughter or applause and tell himself, "Tomorrow I must start again. One hour ago, I was a big man. I was important out there. Now it's empty. It's all gone."

Skelton was invited to play a four-week date at the London Palladium in July 1951. While flying to the engagement, Skelton, Georgia and Father Edward J. Carney, were on a plane from Rome with passengers from an assortment of countries that included 11 children. The plane lost the use of two of its four engines and seemed destined to lose the rest, meaning that the plane would crash over Mont Blanc. The priest readied himself to administer last rites. As he did so, he told Skelton, "You take care of your department, Red, and I'll take care of mine." Skelton diverted the attention of the passengers with pantomimes while Father Carney prayed. They ultimately landed at a small airstrip in Lyon, France. He received both an enthusiastic reception and an invitation to return for the Palladium's Christmas show of that year.

Though Skelton had always done live engagements at Nevada hotels and appearances such as state fairs during his television show's hiatus, he focused his time and energy on live performances after he was no longer on the air, performing up to 125 dates a year. He often arrived days early for his engagement and would serve as his own promotion staff, making the rounds of the local shopping malls. Before the show, his audiences received a ballot listing about 100 of his many routines and were asked to tick off their favorites. The venue's ushers would collect the ballots and tally the votes. Skelton's performance on that given day was based on the skits his audience selected. After he learned that his performances were popular with the hearing-impaired because of his heavy use of pantomimes, Skelton hired a sign language interpreter to translate the non-pantomime portions of his act for all his shows. He continued performing live until 1993, when he celebrated his 80th birthday.

=== Later years and death ===
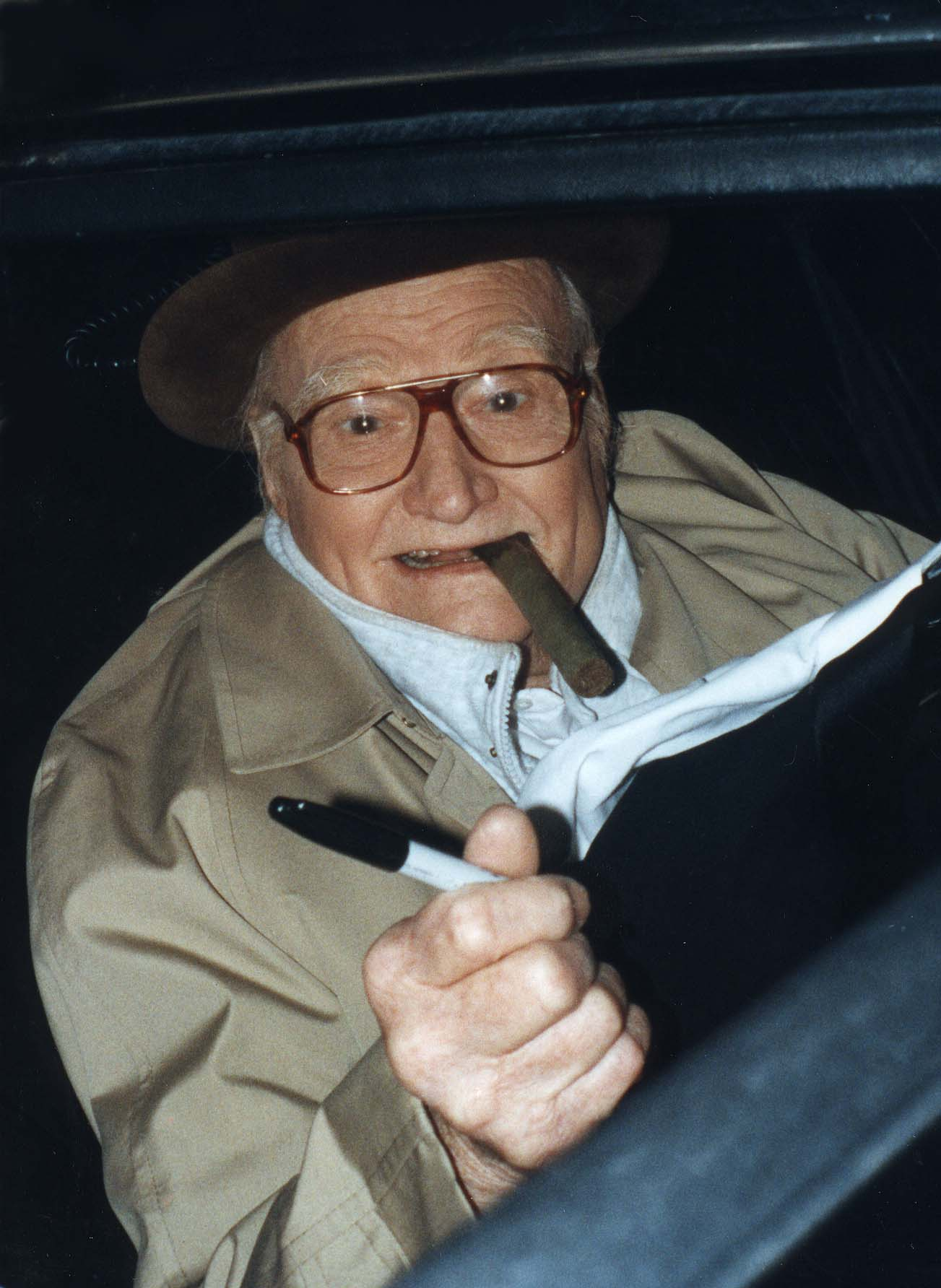
Skelton in 1994

In 1974, Skelton's interest in film work was rekindled with the news that Neil Simon's comedy The Sunshine Boys would become a movie; his last significant film appearance had been in Public Pigeon No. 1 in 1957. He screen tested for the role of Willy Clark with Jack Benny, who had been cast as Al Lewis. Although Simon had planned to cast Jack Albertson, who played Willy on Broadway, in the same role for the film, Skelton's screen test impressed him enough to change his mind. Skelton declined the part, however, reportedly due to an inadequate financial offer, and Benny's final illness forced him to withdraw, as well. George Burns and Walter Matthau ultimately starred in the film. (Note: Skelton offered another explanation for refusing the Willy Clark role: "I turned down the movie The Sunshine Boys because I refused to call Jack Benny a son of a bitch and to look up under a nurse's dress.")

In 1981, Skelton made several specials for HBO, including Freddie the Freeloader's Christmas Dinner (1981) and the Funny Faces series of specials. He gave a Royal Command Performance for the Royal Society for the Protection of Birds in 1984, which was later shown in the U.S. on HBO. A portion of one of his last interviews, conducted by Steven F. Zambo, was broadcast as part of the 2005 PBS special The Pioneers of Primetime.

Skelton died from pneumonia on September 17, 1997, at the Eisenhower Medical Center in Rancho Mirage, California, at the age of 84. (Note: Skelton had been ill for some time but the nature of this illness was not disclosed. Some sources have attributed his death to pneumonia.) He is interred in the Skelton Family Tomb, the family's private room, alongside his son, Richard Freeman Skelton, Jr., and his second wife, Georgia Maureen Davis Skelton, in the Great Mausoleum's Sanctuary of Benediction at Forest Lawn Memorial Park in Glendale, California.

== Art and other interests ==
=== Artwork ===
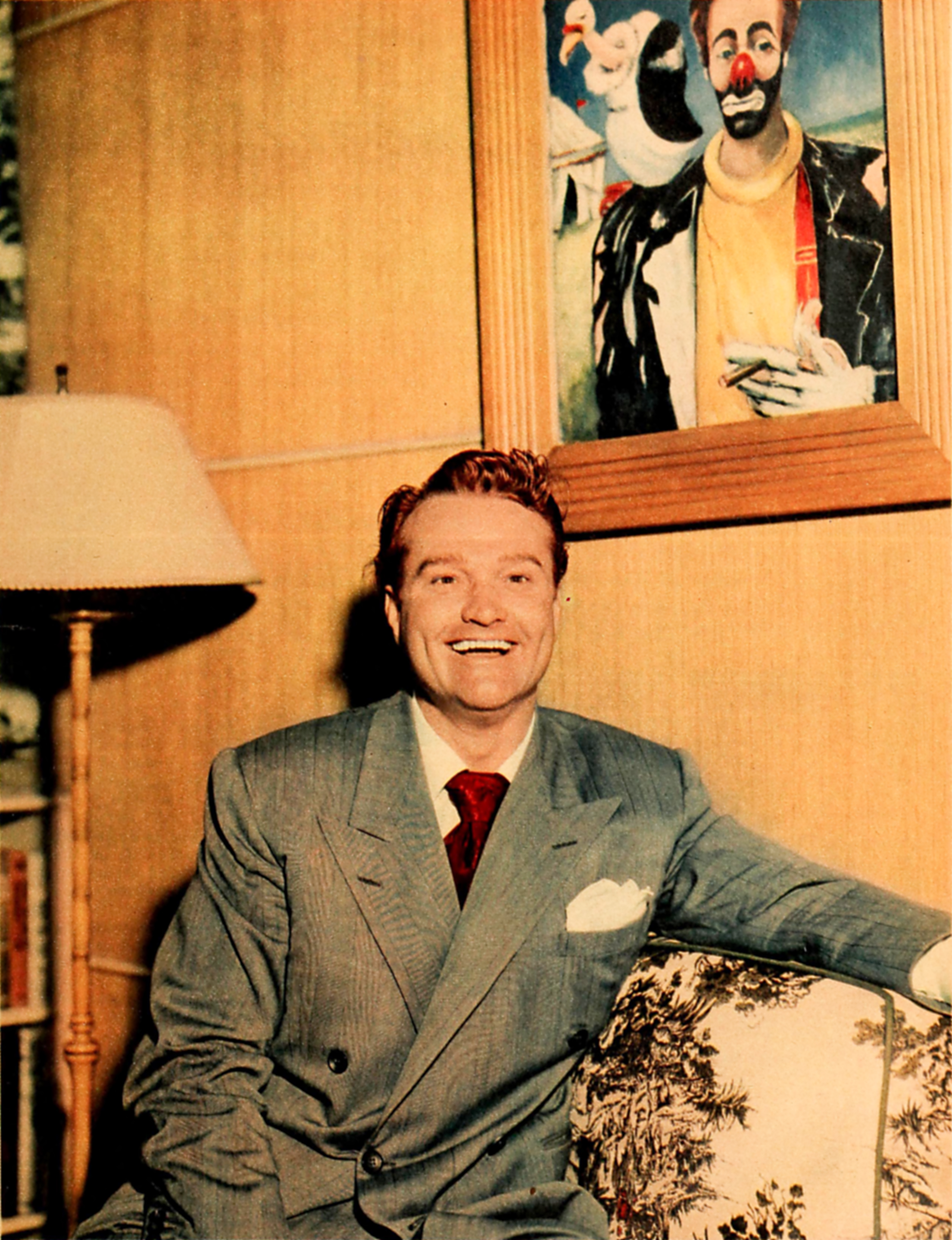
Skelton at home with one of his clown paintings in 1948

Skelton began producing artwork in 1943, but kept his works private for many years. He said he was inspired to try his hand at painting after visiting a large Chicago department store that had various paintings on display. Inquiring as to the price of one, which Skelton described as "a bunch of blotches", he was told, "Ten thousand wouldn't buy that one." He told the clerk he was one of the ten thousand who would not buy the painting, instead buying his own art materials. His wife Georgia, a former art student, persuaded him to have his first public showing of his work in 1964 at the Sands Hotel in Las Vegas, where he was performing at the time. Skelton believed painting was an asset to his comedy work, as it helped him to better visualize the imaginary props used in his pantomime routines.

In addition to his originals, Skelton also sold reproductions and prints through his own mail-order business. He made his work available to art galleries by selling them franchises to display and sell his paintings. He once estimated the sale of his lithographs earned him $2.5 million per year. (Note: Though aware of the value of his artwork, Skelton did not view his works from a strictly monetary standpoint. He would often do an impromptu sketch on whatever was at hand—often a restaurant's linen napkin—and present it to a fan with whom he was visiting.) Shortly after his death, his art dealer said he believed that Skelton made more money on his paintings than from his television work. At the time of his death, Skelton had produced over 1,000 oil paintings of clowns. When asked why his artwork focused on clowns, he said at first, "I don't know why it's always clowns." He continued after thinking a moment by saying "No, that's not true—I do know why. I just don't feel like thinking about it ..." (Note: Skelton also painted ducks and had completed over 3,000 paintings of them in 1973. When he was not pleased with a painting, he threw it into the trash; Skelton's garbage collector rescued these discarded works and sold them.) At the time of Skelton's death, his originals were priced at $80,000 and upward.

=== Other interests ===
Skelton was a prolific writer of both short stories and music. After sleeping only four or five hours a night, he would wake up at 5 am and begin writing stories, composing music, and painting pictures. He wrote at least one short story a week and had composed over 8,000 songs and symphonies by the time of his death. He wrote commercials for Skoal tobacco and sold many of his compositions to Muzak, a company that specialized in providing background music to stores and other businesses. Skelton was also interested in photography; when attending Hollywood parties, he would take photos and give the film to newspaper reporters waiting outside. He was never without a miniature camera, and kept a photographic record of all his paintings. Skelton was also an avid gardener, who created his own Japanese and Italian gardens and cultivated bonsai trees at his home in Palm Springs. He owned a 600-acre (240 ha) horse ranch in the Anza Valley.

== Fraternity and honors ==
Skelton was a Freemason, a member of Vincennes Lodge No. 1, in Indiana. He also was a member of both the Scottish and the York Rites. He was a recipient of the Gold Medal of the General Grand Chapter, Royal Arch Masons, for Distinguished Service in the Arts and Sciences. On September 24, 1969, he received the honorary 33rd degree in the Scottish Rite and was a Gourgas Medal recipient in 1995. Skelton became interested in Masonry as a small boy selling newspapers in Vincennes, when a man bought a paper from him with a $5 bill and told him to keep the change. The young Skelton asked his benefactor why he had given him so much money; the man explained that he was a Mason and Masons are taught to give. Skelton decided to become one also when he was grown. He was also member of the Independent Order of Odd Fellows, as well as a Shriner in Los Angeles.

Skelton was made an honorary brother of Phi Sigma Kappa at Truman State University. In 1961, he became an honorary brother of the Phi Alpha Tau fraternity of Emerson College, when he was awarded the Joseph E. Connor Award for excellence in the field of communications. He also received an honorary degree from the college at the same ceremony. Skelton received an honorary high-school diploma from Vincennes High School. He was also an honorary member of Kappa Kappa Psi band fraternity; Skelton had composed many marches, which were used by more than 10,000 high-school and college bands. In 1986, Skelton received an honorary degree from Ball State University.

The Red Skelton Memorial Bridge spans the Wabash River and provides the highway link between Illinois and Indiana on U.S. Route 50, near Skelton's home town of Vincennes. He attended the dedication ceremonies in 1963.

== Awards and recognition ==
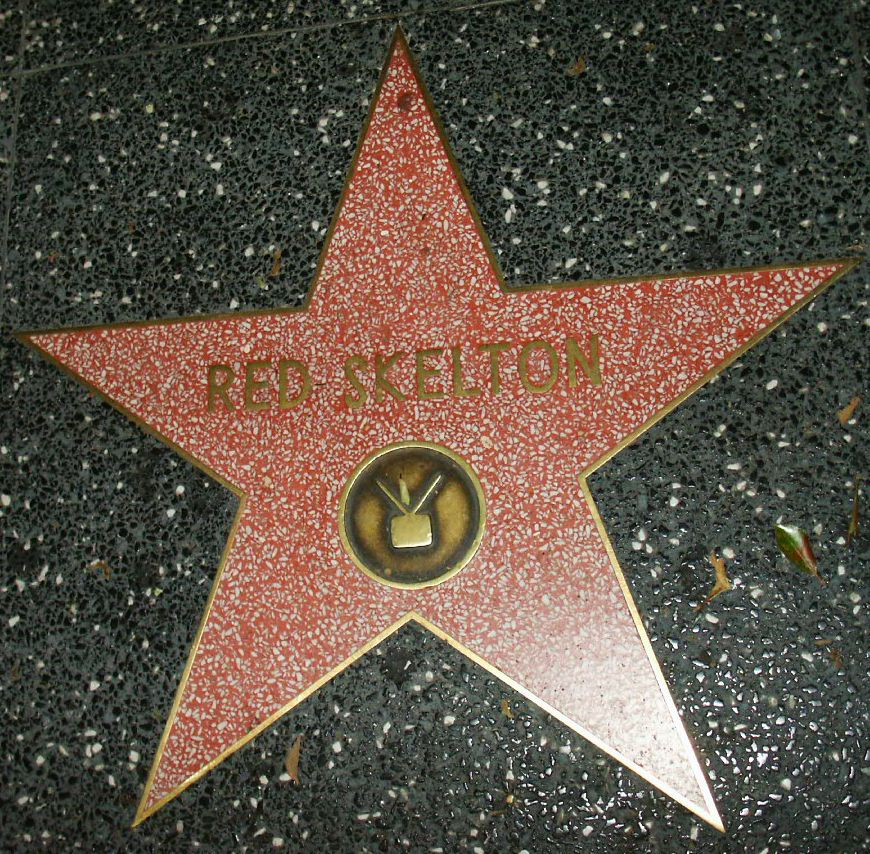
Skelton's star for his work in television on the Hollywood Walk of Fame

In 1952, Skelton received Emmy Awards for Best Comedy Program and Best Comedian. He also received an Emmy nomination in 1957 for his noncomedic performance in Playhouse 90's presentation of "The Big Slide". Skelton and his writers won another Emmy in 1961 for Outstanding Writing Achievement in Comedy. He was named an honorary faculty member of Ringling Bros. and Barnum & Bailey Clown College in 1968 and 1969.

Skelton's first major post-television recognition came in 1978, when the Golden Globe Awards named him as the recipient for their Cecil B. DeMille Award, which is given to honor outstanding contributions in entertainment. His excitement was so great upon receiving the award and a standing ovation, that he clutched it tightly enough to break the statuette. When he was presented with the Academy of Television Arts & Sciences' Governor's Award in 1986, Skelton received a standing ovation. "I want to thank you for sitting down", he said when the ovation subsided. "I thought you were pulling a CBS and walking out on me." The honor came 16 years after his television program left the airwaves.

Skelton received a Lifetime Achievement Award from the Screen Actors Guild in 1987, and in 1988, he was inducted into the Academy of Television Arts & Sciences' Television Hall of Fame. He was one of the International Clown Hall of Fame's first inductees in 1989. Skelton and Katharine Hepburn were honored with lifetime achievement awards by the American Comedy Awards in the same year. He was inducted into the National Radio Hall of Fame in 1994. Skelton also has two stars on the Hollywood Walk of Fame for his radio and television work.

== Legacy and tributes ==
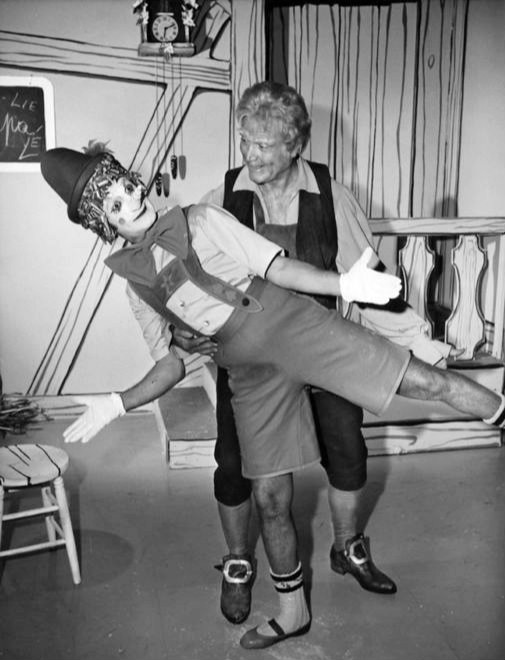
Skelton performing with Marcel Marceau, 1965 – the two were friends for many years.

Skelton preferred to be described as a clown rather than a comic: "A comedian goes out and hits people right on. A clown uses pathos. He can be funny, then turn right around and reach people and touch them with what life is like." "I just want to be known as a clown", he said, "because to me that's the height of my profession. It means you can do everything—sing, dance and above all, make people laugh." His purpose in life, he believed, was to make people laugh.

In Groucho and Me, Groucho Marx called Skelton "the most unacclaimed clown in show business", and "the logical successor to [Charlie] Chaplin", largely because of his ability to play a multitude of characters with minimal use of dialogue and props. "With one prop, a soft battered hat", Groucho wrote, describing a performance he had witnessed, "he successfully converted himself into an idiot boy, a peevish old lady, a teetering-tottering drunk, an overstuffed clubwoman, a tramp, and any other character that seemed to suit his fancy. No grotesque make-up, no funny clothes, just Red." He added that Skelton also "plays a dramatic scene about as effectively as any of the dramatic actors." In late 1965, ventriloquist Edgar Bergen, reminiscing about the entertainment business, singled out Skelton for high praise. "It's all so very different today. The whole business of comedy has changed — from 15 minutes of quality to quantity. We had a lot of very funny people around, from Charley Chase to Charlie Chaplin and Laurel and Hardy. The last one of that breed is Red Skelton." Harry Cohn of Columbia Pictures also praised Skelton, saying, "He's a clown in the old tradition. He doesn't need punch lines. He's got heart."

Skelton and Marcel Marceau shared a long friendship and admiration of each other's work. Marceau appeared on Skelton's CBS television show three times, including one turn as the host in 1961 as Skelton recovered from surgery. He was also a guest on the three Funny Faces specials that Skelton produced for HBO. In a TV Guide interview after Skelton's death, Marceau said, "Red, you are eternal for me and the millions of people you made laugh and cry. May God bless you forever, my great and precious companion. I will never forget that silent world we created together." CBS issued the following statement upon his death: "Red's audience had no age limits. He was the consummate family entertainer—a winsome clown, a storyteller without peer, a superb mime, a singer, and a dancer."

The Red Skelton Performing Arts Center was dedicated in February 2006 on the campus of Vincennes University, one block from the home in Vincennes where Skelton was born. The building includes an 850-seat theater, classrooms, rehearsal rooms, and dressing rooms. Its grand foyer is a gallery for Skelton's paintings, statues, and film posters. The theater hosts theatrical and musical productions by Vincennes University, as well as special events, convocations, and conventions. The adjacent Red Skelton Museum of American Comedy opened on July 18, 2013, on what would have been Skelton's 100th birthday. It houses his personal and professional materials, which he had collected since the age of 10, in accordance with his wishes that they be made available in his hometown for the public's enjoyment. Skelton's widow, Lothian, noted that he expressed no interest in any sort of Hollywood memorial. (Note: Skelton gave an interview in 1984 where he said he had kept all his personal effects since the age of 10; he also indicated that he would "let someone else go through it".) The museum is funded jointly by the Red Skelton Museum Foundation and the Indiana Historical Society. Other foundation projects include a fund that provides new clothes to Vincennes children from low-income families. The foundation also purchased Skelton's birthplace. On July 15, 2017, the state of Indiana unveiled a state historic marker at the home in Vincennes where Skelton was born.

The town of Vincennes has held an annual Red Skelton Festival since 2005. A "Parade of a Thousand Clowns", billed as the largest clown parade in the Midwest, is followed by family-oriented activities and live music performances.

== Filmography ==
=== Features ===
- Dead End (1937) as paramedic/doctor (uncredited)
- Having Wonderful Time (1938) as Itchy
- Flight Command (1940) as Lieut. 'Mugger' Martin
- The People vs. Dr. Kildare (1941) as Vernon Briggs
- Whistling in the Dark (1941) as Wally Benton
- Dr. Kildare's Wedding Day (1941) as Vernon Briggs
- Lady Be Good (1941) as Joe 'Red' Willet
- Ship Ahoy (1942) as Merton K. Kibble
- Maisie Gets Her Man (1942) as 'Hap' Hixby
- Panama Hattie (1942) as Red
- Whistling in Dixie (1942) as Wally 'The Fox' Benton
- Du Barry Was a Lady (1943) as Louis Blore / King Louis XV
- I Dood It (1943) as Joseph Rivington Renolds
- Thousands Cheer (1943) as Red Skelton
- Whistling in Brooklyn (1943) as Wally 'The Fox' Benton
- Bathing Beauty (1944) as Steve Elliot
- Ziegfeld Follies (1946) as J. Newton Numbskull ('When Television Comes')
- The Show-Off (1946) as J. Aubrey Piper
- Merton of the Movies (1947) as Merton Gill aka Clifford Armytage
- The Fuller Brush Man (1948) as Red Jones
- A Southern Yankee (1948) as Aubrey Filmore
- Neptune's Daughter (1949) as Jack Spratt
- The Yellow Cab Man (1950) as Augustus 'Red' Pirdy
- Three Little Words (1950) as Harry Ruby
- Duchess of Idaho (1950) as Himself (uncredited)
- The Fuller Brush Girl (1950, cameo) as Himself – Fuller Brush Man (uncredited)
- Watch the Birdie (1950) as Rusty Cammeron / Pop Cammeron / Grandpop Cammeron
- Excuse My Dust (1951) as Joe Belden
- Texas Carnival (1951) as Cornie Quinell
- Lovely to Look At (1952) as Al Marsh
- The Clown (1953) as Dodo Delwyn
- Half a Hero (1953) as Ben Dobson
- The Great Diamond Robbery (1954) as Ambrose C. Park
- Susan Slept Here (1954, cameo) as Oswald from North Dakota (uncredited)
- Around the World in 80 Days (1956, cameo) as Drunk in Barbary Coast Saloon
- Public Pigeon No. 1 (1957) as Rusty Morgan
- Ocean's 11 (1960, cameo) as Gambler
- Those Magnificent Men in Their Flying Machines (1965) as The Neanderthal Man / Passenger on Airport
- Rudolph's Shiny New Year (1976) as Father Time and Baby Bear (voice role)
- Red Skelton's Christmas Dinner (1981)

=== Short subjects ===
- The Broadway Buckaroo (1939) as Red
- Seeing Red (1939) as Red / Doorman / Coatroom Attendant / Waiter / Emcee
- Radio Bugs (1944) as Red Skelton (voice, uncredited)
- Week End in Hollywood (1947), cameo
- The Luckiest Guy in the World (1947, voice)
- Some of the Best (1949)

=== Box-office ranking ===
Based on rankings of the amount of money earned in box-office receipts for film showings, for a number of years Skelton was among the most popular stars in the country:

- 1944 – 16th-largest box-office draw
- 1949 – 13th
- 1951 – 14th
- 1952 – 21st

== Published works ==
- Red Skelton's Favorite Ghost Stories. 1965. OCLC 3695410.
- A Red Skeleton in Your Closet; Ghost Stories Gay and Grim. 1965. OCLC 1744491.
- Gertrude & Heathcliffe. 1974. OCLC 1129973.
- The Ventriloquist. 1984. OCLC 144598647.
- Old Whitey. 1984. OCLC 144598636.
- The Great Lazarus. 1986.

== Sources cited ==
- Adir, Karin (2001). The Great Clowns of American Television. McFarland. ISBN 978-0-7864-1303-4.
- Affron, Charles and Mirella (2009). Best Years: Going to the Movies, 1945–1946. Rutgers University Press. ISBN 978-0-8135-4845-6.
- The American Film Institute Catalog of Motion Pictures Produced in the United States. University of California Press. 1997. ISBN 978-0-520-20970-1.
- Balducci, Anthony (2011). The Funny Parts: A History of Film Comedy Routines and Gags. McFarland. ISBN 978-0-7864-8893-3.
- Danilov, Victor J. (1997). Hall of Fame Museums: A Reference Guide. Greenwood Publishing Group. ISBN 978-0-313-30000-4.
- Dunning, John (1998). On the Air: The Encyclopedia of Old-Time Radio. Oxford University Press. ISBN 0-19-507678-8.
- Foster, Charles (2003). Once Upon a Time in Paradise: Canadians in the Golden Age of Hollywood. Dundurn. ISBN 978-1-55002-464-7.
- Gehring, Wes (2008). Red Skelton: The Mask Behind the Mask. Indiana Historical Society. ISBN 978-0-87195-275-2.
- Heim, Michael (2007). Exploring Indiana Highways: Trip Trivia. Exploring America's Highway. ISBN 978-0-9744358-3-1.
- Hyatt, Wesley (2004). A Critical History of Television's The Red Skelton Show, 1951–1971. Jefferson, North Carolina: McFarland. ISBN 978-0-7864-4686-5.
- Knopf, Robert (1999). The Theater and Cinema of Buster Keaton. Princeton University. ISBN 978-0-691-00442-6.
- Langman, Larry; Gold, Paul (2001). Comedy Quotes from the Movies: Over 4,000 Bits of Humorous Dialogue from All Film Genres, Topically Arranged and Indexed. McFarland. ISBN 978-0-7864-1110-8.
- Maltin, Leonard; Green, Spencer (2010). Leonard Maltin's Classic Movie Guide: From the Silent Era Through 1965. Plume. ISBN 978-0-452-29577-3.
- Marx, Arthur (1979). Red Skelton: An Unauthorized Biography. E. P. Dutton. ISBN 978-0-525-18953-4.
- Marx, Groucho (1959). Groucho And Me. Da Capo Press.ISBN 978-0-306-80666-7
- Mott, Robert L. (2003). Radio Live! Television Live!: Those Golden Days When Horses Were Coconuts. McFarland. ISBN 978-0-7864-1812-1.
- Nachman, Gerald (2000). Raised on Radio. University of California Press. ISBN 978-0-520-22303-5.
- Pendergast, Sara and Tom (1999). St. James Encyclopedia of Popular Culture. St. James Press. ISBN 978-1-55862-400-9.
- Reid, John Howard (2006). Hollywood Movie Musicals. Lulu.com. ISBN 978-1-4116-9762-1.
- Sterling, Christopher H. (2013). Biographical Dictionary of Radio. Routledge. ISBN 978-1-136-99376-3.
- Vogel, Michelle (2006). Marjorie Main: The Life and Films of Hollywood's "Ma Kettle". McFarland. ISBN 978-0-7864-6443-2.
