= John Longenecker =

American film producer

John Longenecker (born 1947) is an American film producer, Directors Guild of America member, screenwriter and cinematographer who produced the Academy Award-winning live-action short film The Resurrection of Broncho Billy (1970).

== Biography ==
John Longenecker grew up in Southern California. His mother, actress Ruth Hussey (1911–2005), was Oscar-nominated for her portrayal of Liz Imbrie, the cynical magazine photographer in The Philadelphia Story (1940). His father, Bob Longenecker (1909–2002), worked as a producer at CBS Radio Network in Los Angeles and later established a motion picture and television talent agency.

== Academy Award – live action short film ==
In 1967, Longenecker attended the UCLA Film School. In 1968 he enrolled in film production classes at the University of Southern California – USC Cinema Department. He produced The Resurrection of Broncho Billy (1970) at USC Cinema. For his film crew Longnecker invited film directors Nick Castle and John Carpenter to work with him on the senior year project. The unusual spelling "Broncho" in the short's title was an homage to Broncho Billy Anderson, considered filmdom's first cowboy star.

Castle was the cinematographer for the short, Carpenter was the film editor and composed the music for the picture, and James Rokos directed the short film. All four of the filmmakers along with Trace Johnston made creative contributions to the story for the film. Produced on a $700 budget ($5,000 in 2013 dollars), The Resurrection of Broncho Billy received the 1970 Academy Award for best live action short film. At 23, Longenecker was the youngest producer in history to have a film win an Oscar. Johnny Crawford and Kristin Nelson played the lead roles in the movie short, a 20-minute film about a young guy who lives in a big city in the modern day but fantasizes about living in the old west. Universal Studios theatrically released the film for two years in the United States and Canada.

In 1971, Longenecker produced and hosted an hour-long program, Student Film Festival: Take One, which was broadcast on KTLA and featured screenings of ten short films chosen from Universal Studios' Student Film Library, including a portion of The Resurrection of Broncho Billy.
