= Mark Harmon =

American actor (born 1951)

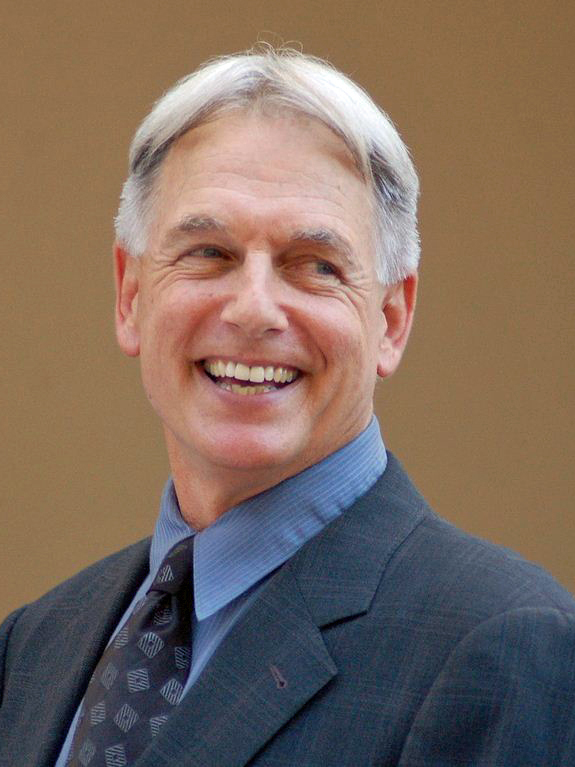
- Harmon in 2012
- Born: Thomas Mark Harmon; September 2, 1951 (age 75); Burbank, California, U.S.
- Education: University of California, Los Angeles (BA)
- Occupations: Actor; producer; director; author
- Years active: 1970–present
- Spouse: Pam Dawber (m. 1987)
- Children: 2
- Parents: Tom Harmon (father); Elyse Knox (mother)
- Relatives: Kelly Harmon (sister); Kristin Nelson (sister); Gunnar Nelson (nephew); Matthew Nelson (nephew); Tracy Nelson (niece)
- Football career

No. 7
- Position: Quarterback

Personal information
- Listed height: 6 ft 0 in (1.83 m)
- Listed weight: 185 lb (84 kg)

Career information
- High school: Harvard-Westlake
- College: Pierce College (1970–1971); UCLA (1972–1973)

Awards and highlights
- NJCAA All-American (1971); NFF National Scholar-Athlete Award (1973); Second-team Academic All-America (1973); Pierce College Athletic Hall of Fame (2010)

Thomas Mark Harmon (born September 2, 1951) is an American actor, writer, producer, television director and former football player. He is best known for playing the lead role of Leroy Jethro Gibbs on NCIS.

He has appeared in a wide variety of television roles since the early 1970s, including as Dr. Robert Caldwell on St. Elsewhere, Detective Dicky Cobb on Reasonable Doubts, and Dr. Jack McNeil on Chicago Hope. He also starred in such films as Summer School, Prince of Bel Air, Stealing Home, Wyatt Earp, Fear and Loathing in Las Vegas, Crossfire Trail, Local Boys, Freaky Friday, and Chasing Liberty.

Harmon played Secret Service special agent Simon Donovan in a four-episode story arc in The West Wing in 2002, receiving an Emmy Award nomination for the role. Harmon's character of NCIS Special Agent Leroy Jethro Gibbs was introduced in a guest starring role in two episodes of JAG. From 2003 to 2021 and since 2024, Harmon starred in the spinoffs NCIS and NCIS: Origins as the same character.

== Early life ==
Harmon was born on September 2, 1951, in Burbank, California. His parents were Heisman Trophy-winning football player and broadcaster Tom Harmon and actress, model, and artist Elyse Knox (née Elsie Lillian Kornbrath). He is the youngest of their three children.

Harmon had two older sisters, the late actress and painter Kristin Nelson, who was divorced from the late singer Rick Nelson, and actress and model Kelly Harmon, formerly married to car magnate John DeLorean. His father was of Irish descent, while his maternal grandparents were Austrian immigrants.

=== College football ===
After his high school graduation from Harvard-Westlake School in 1970, Harmon completed a two-year associate degree at Pierce College in Los Angeles. After his second season at Pierce, 1971, Harmon received offers from major college football programs, ultimately choosing UCLA over Oklahoma, even though in the previous season, 1971, the Sooners finished second in the nation, while the Bruins had stumbled to a 2–7–1 record, placing last in the Pac-8.

After transferring to the University of California, Los Angeles, he started as quarterback for the 1972 and 1973 Bruins.

During his first game, his UCLA team produced a stunning upset of the two-time defending national champion Nebraska Cornhuskers. The Bruins were an eighteen-point home underdog to the top-ranked Huskers but won 20–17 on a late field goal by Efren Herrera at L.A. Coliseum.

In his senior year, Harmon received the National Football Foundation Award for All-Round Excellence. During his two years as quarterback in coach Pepper Rodgers' wishbone offense, UCLA compiled a 17–5 record (.773). Harmon was UCLA's starting quarterback for two seasons, but he was not picked in the 1974 NFL draft.

Harmon graduated cum laude from UCLA in 1974 with a B.A. in Communications.

He was inducted into the inaugural class of the Pierce College Athletic Hall of Fame in 2010.

== Career ==
After college, Harmon considered pursuing a career in advertising or law. Harmon started his career in business as a merchandising director, but soon decided to switch to acting. He spent much of his career portraying law enforcement and medical personnel. One of his first national TV appearances (other than as an athlete) was in a commercial for Kellogg's Product 19 cereal with his father, Tom Harmon, its longstanding TV spokesman. Thanks to his sister Kristin's in-laws, Ozzie Nelson and Harriet Nelson, he landed his first job as an actor in an episode of Ozzie's Girls. This was followed by guest roles in episodes of Adam-12, Police Woman, and Emergency! in mid-1975. He also performed in "905-Wild", a backdoor pilot episode for a series about two L.A. County Animal Control Officers which did not sell. Producer/creator Jack Webb, who was the packager of both series, later cast Harmon in Sam, a short-lived 1978 series about an LAPD officer and his K-9 partner. Before this, Harmon received an Emmy nomination for Outstanding Supporting Actor in a Miniseries or a Movie for his performance as Robert Dunlap in the television film Eleanor and Franklin: The White House Years. In 1978, he appeared in three episodes of the mini-series, Centennial, as Captain John MacIntosh, an honorable Union cavalry officer.

During the mid- to late-1970s, Harmon made guest appearances on TV series, including Laverne & Shirley, Delvecchio, The Hardy Boys/Nancy Drew Mysteries, and had supporting roles in the feature films Comes a Horseman (1978) and Beyond the Poseidon Adventure (1979). He then landed a co-starring role on the 1979 action series 240-Robert as Deputy Dwayne Thibideaux. The series centered around the missions of the Los Angeles County Sheriff's Department Emergency Services Detail, but was also short-lived.

In 1980, Harmon gained a regular role in the prime time soap opera Flamingo Road, in which he played Fielding Carlisle, the husband of Morgan Fairchild's character. Despite initially good ratings, the series was canceled after two seasons. Following its cancellation, he landed the role of Dr. Robert Caldwell on the series St. Elsewhere in 1983. Harmon appeared in the show for almost three seasons before leaving in early 1986 when his character contracted HIV through unprotected intercourse, one of the first instances where a major recurring television character contracted the virus (the character's subsequent off-screen death from AIDS would be mentioned two years later). In the mid-1980s, Harmon also became the spokesperson for Coors Regular beer, appearing in television commercials for them.

Harmon's career reached several other high points in 1986. In January, he was named People magazine's Sexiest Man Alive. Following his departure from St. Elsewhere in February, he played the lead in the television films Prince of Bel Air, co-starring with Kirstie Alley, and The Deliberate Stranger, in which he portrayed the real-life serial killer Ted Bundy. With his career blossoming, he played a role in the 1986 theatrical film Let's Get Harry and the lead role in the 1987 comedy Summer School, again co-starring with Kirstie Alley and alongside future JAG and NCIS alum Patrick Labyorteaux. Returning briefly to episodic television in 1987, Harmon had a limited engagement on the series Moonlighting, playing Cybill Shepherd's love interest Sam Crawford for four episodes. He then starred in the 1987 television film After the Promise. In 1988, he co-starred with Sean Connery and Meg Ryan in the 1988 feature film The Presidio, and also opposite Jodie Foster in the film Stealing Home. After his 1989 comedy Worth Winning, he returned to television, appearing in various television films.

Harmon's next regular television role would be as Chicago police detective Dickie Cobb for two seasons (1991–1993) on the NBC series Reasonable Doubts. In 1993, he appeared in one episode in the role of a rodeo clown on the CBS comedy/western series Harts of the West with future NCIS castmate Sean Murray. In 1994, he had a role in the Western film Wyatt Earp.

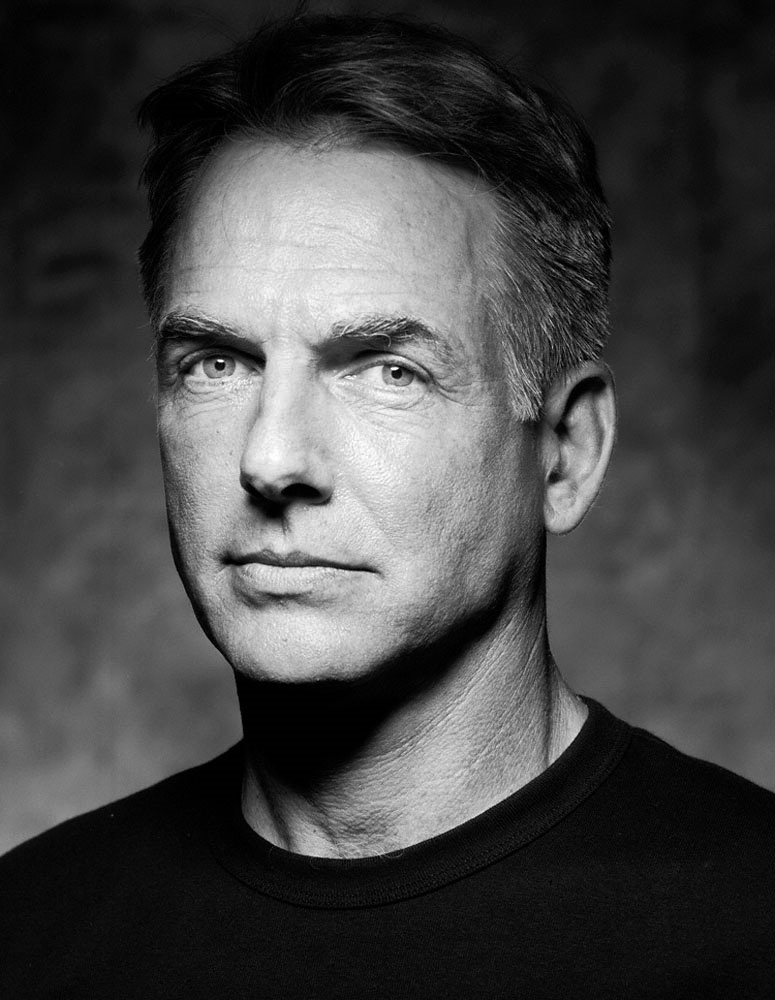
Harmon in 2005

In 1995, Harmon starred in the ABC series Charlie Grace, in which he portrayed a private investigator. The series lasted only one season, after which he returned to ensemble medical shows on the series Chicago Hope, in which he played Dr. Jack McNeil from 1996 to 2000. He also portrayed astronaut Wally Schirra in one episode of the 1998 mini-series From the Earth to the Moon. His movie roles during that time included Fear and Loathing in Las Vegas (1998), Crossfire Trail (2001), and Local Boys (2002). In 2003, Harmon had a supporting role in the remake of the comedy film Freaky Friday. In 2004, he appeared in the romantic comedy Chasing Liberty.

Harmon has also starred in several stage productions in Los Angeles and Toronto. At the Cast Theatre in Los Angeles, he performed in Wrestlers and The Wager. In the late 1980s he was part of the cast of the Canadian premiere of Key Exchange. Several productions of Love Letters provided him the opportunity to play alongside his wife Pam Dawber.

=== NCIS ===
In May 2002, Harmon portrayed Secret Service special agent Simon Donovan on The West Wing in a four-episode story arc. The role gained him his second Emmy Award nomination, exactly 25 years after his first. Donald P. Bellisario, the creator of JAG and NCIS, saw him on The West Wing and had Harmon appear in a guest starring role in two episodes of JAG in April 2003, where Harmon was introduced as the character of NCIS agent Leroy Jethro Gibbs. Starting that September, Harmon has starred as Gibbs in the CBS drama NCIS, a role which has earned him six nominations at the People's Choice Awards including a win for Favorite TV Crime Drama Actor in 2017. During his time on the show, he was reunited with three of his former Chicago Hope co-stars, Rocky Carroll, Lauren Holly, and Jayne Brook. Since 2008, he has also been a producer and executive producer.

In the fourth episode of the show's nineteenth season, Harmon's Gibbs exited the series as a regular, an exit set in motion by the events of the previous season finale. In October 2024, three years after his departure from NCIS, Harmon reprises as Gibbs in NCIS prequel NCIS: Origins, where he mainly serves as a narrator and made a cameo appearance in the prequel's two-part pilot episode. He physically returned for the second time for the NCIS and NCIS: Origins crossover special on Veterans Day 2025.

== Other activities ==
Harmon received the 2,482nd star of the Hollywood Walk of Fame on October 1, 2012.

In 2014, Harmon started a production company called Wings Productions to produce NCIS: New Orleans. As of 2018, Harmon works as a producer for a new CBS series, based on author John Sandford's best-selling Prey novels, which have sold more than 30 million copies worldwide. The last 10 have reached No. 1 on The New York Times best-seller list.

Harmon also directed two episodes of Chicago Hope in 1999 and 2000, and two episodes of Boston Public in 2002.

In 2023 Harmon, with retired NCIS Special Agent Leon Carroll Jr., released Ghosts of Honolulu: A Japanese spy, a Japanese American spy hunter, and the untold story of Pearl Harbor. Harmon also narrates the audio book.

== Personal life ==
Harmon is the son of football player Tom Harmon and actress Elyse Knox. His sisters are Kelly, an actress and model, and Kristin, an actress and painter. Kristin died of a heart attack on April 27, 2018.

Harmon has been married to actress Pam Dawber since March 21, 1987. The couple have two sons. His son Sean played a young Gibbs in several NCIS episodes and recurred as FBI Agent Casey Bloom in NCIS: Origins. They maintain a low profile and rarely appear in public with their children. Harmon was the brother-in-law of Ricky Nelson and John DeLorean and is the uncle of actress Tracy Nelson and singers Matthew and Gunnar Nelson of the rock duo Nelson.

In 1987, Harmon filed for custody of his nephew Sam, Kristin's son, on the grounds that she was incapable of good parenting. Sam's psychiatrist testified that the thirteen-year-old boy depicted his mother as a dragon and complained about her mood swings and how she prevented him from being with his siblings. Harmon later dropped the custody bid.

In 1988, Harmon was part owner of a minor league baseball team, the San Bernardino Spirit, the same season Ken Griffey Jr. played for the team before his major league call-up to the Seattle Mariners the next season. Harmon used the team and their home field, Fiscalini Field, for the opening and closing scenes of the film in which he was starring, Stealing Home.

In 1996, Harmon saved two teenage boys involved in a car accident outside his Brentwood home. One passenger suffered severe burns, but survived his injuries.

== Filmography ==
=== Film ===
Year	Title	Role	Notes
1978	Comes a Horseman	Billy Joe Meynert	
1979	Beyond the Poseidon Adventure	Larry Simpson	
1981	Goliath Awaits	Peter Cabot	
1984	Tuareg – The Desert Warrior	Gacel Sayah	
1986	Let's Get Harry	Harry Burck Jr.	
1987	Summer School	Freddy Shoop	
1987	After the Promise	Elmer Jackson	
1988	The Presidio	Jay Austin	
1988	Stealing Home	Billy Wyatt	
1989	Worth Winning	Taylor Worth	
1990	Till There Was You	Frank Flynn	
1990	Kenny Rogers Classic Weekend	Himself	
1991	Cold Heaven	Alex Davenport	
1994	Natural Born Killers	Mickey (Reenactment)	uncredited
1994	Wyatt Earp	Sheriff John Behan	
1995	Magic in the Water	Jack Black	
1995	The Last Supper	Dominant Male	
1997	Casualties	Tommy Nance	
1997	The First to Go	Jeremy Hampton	
1998	Fear and Loathing in Las Vegas	Magazine Reporter	
1999	I'll Remember April	John Cooper	
2001	The Amati Girls	Lawrence	
2001	Crossfire Trail	Bruce Barkow	
2002	Local Boys	Jim Wesley	
2003	Freaky Friday	Ryan	
2004	Chasing Liberty	President James Foster	
2009	Weather Girl	Dale	
2010	Justice League: Crisis on Two Earths	Clark Kent/Superman (voice)	Direct-to-video
2025	Freakier Friday	Ryan	

=== Television ===
Year	Title	Role	Notes
1973	Ozzie's Girls	Mark Johnson	Episode: "The Candidate"
1975	Emergency!	Officer Dave Gordon	Episode: "905-Wild"
1975	Adam-12	Officer Gus Corbin	Episode: "Gus Corbin"
1975	Adam-12	Officer Albert Porter	Episode: "Wednesday Warrior"
1975, 1976	Police Woman	Paul Donin; Stansky	Episode: "No Place to Hide"; Episode: "Tender Soldier"
1976	Laverne & Shirley	Victor	Episode: "Dating Slump"
1976	All's Fair	Ron	Episode: "Jealousy"
1976	Delvecchio	Ronnie Striker	Episode: "Hot Spell"
1977	Eleanor and Franklin: The White House Years	Robert Dunlap	Television film
1977	The Hardy Boys	Chip Garvey	Episode: "Mystery of the Solid Gold Kicker"
1978	Getting Married	Howard Lesser	Television film
1978	Little Mo	Norman Brinker	Television film
1978	Sam	Officer Mike Breen	7 episodes
1978–1979	Centennial	Captain John McIntosh	3 episodes
1979	The Love Boat	Doug Bradbury	Episode: "Alaskan Wedding Cruise" Part 1 and 2
1979–1980	240-Robert	Dwayne Thibodeaux	13 episodes
1980; 1981–1982	Flamingo Road	Fielding Carlyle	37 episodes
1980	The Dream Merchants	Johnny Edge	Miniseries
1981	Goliath Awaits	Peter Cabot	Television film
1983	The Love Boat	Rick Tucker	Episode: "Julie and the Bachelor/Set-up for Romance/Intensive Care"
1983	Intimate Agony (aka Doctor in Paradise)	Tommy	Television film
1983–1986	St. Elsewhere	Dr. Robert Caldwell	70 episodes
1986	The Deliberate Stranger	Ted Bundy	Television film
1986	Prince of Bel Air	Robin Prince	Television film
1987	Moonlighting	Sam Crawford	4 episodes
1987	Saturday Night Live	Himself/Host	Episode: May 9, 1987
1987	After the Promise	Elmer Jackson	Television film
1989	Sweet Bird of Youth	Chance Wayne	Television film
1991–1993	Reasonable Doubts	Detective Dicky Cobb	45 episodes
1991	Dillinger	John Dillinger	Television film
1991	Fourth Story	David Shepard	Television film
1991	Shadow of a Doubt	Uncle Charlie Oakley	Television film
1991	Long Road Home	Ertie Robertson	Television film
1993	Harts of the West	Sam Carver	Episode: "The Right Stuff"
1995	Charlie Grace	Charlie Grace	9 episodes
1995	Original Sins (aka Acts of Contrition)	Johnathan Frayne	Television film
1996	Strangers	Mark	Episode: "Visit"
1996	E! True Hollywood Story	Himself	Episode: "Dark Obsession"
1996–2000	Chicago Hope	Dr. Jack McNeil	95 episodes
1997	Adventures from the Book of Virtues	Ulysses (voice)	Episode: "Perseverance"
1998	From the Earth to the Moon	Wally Schirra	Episode: "We Have Cleared the Tower"
2000	For All Time	Charles Lattimer	Television film
2001	The Legend of Tarzan	Bob Markham (voice)	Episode: "Tarzan and the Outbreak"
2001	Crossfire Trail	Bruce Barkow	Television film
2001	And Never Let Her Go	Thomas Capano	Television film
2002	The West Wing	Agent Simon Donovan	4 episodes
2003	JAG	Leroy Jethro Gibbs	Episodes: "Ice Queen" and "Meltdown"
2003–2021	NCIS	Leroy Jethro Gibbs	435 episodes; producer and executive producer for 363 episodes
2004	Retrosexual: The 80's	Himself	TV miniseries
2011	Certain Prey	Lucas Davenport	Television film
2012	Family Guy	Leroy Jethro Gibbs	Voice, episode: "Tom Tucker: The Man and His Dream"
2014–2021	NCIS: New Orleans	Leroy Jethro Gibbs	Episodes: "Breakdown Brig", "Sister City (Part II)", "Pandora's Box (Part II), "See You Soon"; also executive producer
2024–present	NCIS: Origins	Leroy Jethro Gibbs	Pilot episode and "Funny How Time Slips Away" for the NCIS and Origins 2025 crossover special; narrator; Main since season 3; also executive producer

== Awards and nominations ==
Year	Association	Category	Nominated work	Result
1977	Primetime Emmy Awards	Outstanding Supporting Actor in a Miniseries or a Movie	Eleanor and Franklin: The White House Years	Nominated
1987	Golden Globe Awards	Best Actor – Miniseries or Television Film	The Deliberate Stranger	Nominated
1988	Golden Globe Awards	Best Actor – Miniseries or Television Film	After the Promise	Nominated
1992	Golden Globe Awards	Best Actor – Television Series Drama	Reasonable Doubts	Nominated
1992	Viewers for Quality Television	Best Actor in a Quality Drama Series	Reasonable Doubts	Nominated
1993	Golden Globe Awards	Best Actor – Television Series Drama	Reasonable Doubts	Nominated
1993	Viewers for Quality Television	Best Actor in a Quality Drama Series	Reasonable Doubts	Nominated
1997	Screen Actors Guild Awards	Outstanding Performance by an Ensemble in a Drama Series	Chicago Hope	Nominated
1998	Screen Actors Guild Awards	Outstanding Performance by an Ensemble in a Drama Series	Chicago Hope	Nominated
2002	Primetime Emmy Awards	Outstanding Guest Actor in a Drama Series	The West Wing	Nominated
2011	People's Choice Awards	Favorite TV Crime Fighter	NCIS	Nominated
2013	Prism Awards	Male Performance in a Drama Series	NCIS	Won
2014	People's Choice Awards	Favorite Dramatic TV Actor	NCIS	Nominated
2016	People's Choice Awards	Favorite Crime Drama TV Actor	NCIS	Nominated
2017	People's Choice Awards	Favorite Crime Drama TV Actor	NCIS	Won
