= Sam (1978 TV series) =

- Genre: Crime drama
- Written by: James Doherty; Robert I. Holt
- Starring: Mark Harmon
- Composer: Billy May
- Country of origin: United States
- Original language: English
- No. of seasons: 1
- No. of episodes: 6

Production
- Executive producer: Jack Webb
- Producer: Leonard B. Kaufman
- Cinematography: Robert Wyckoff
- Camera setup: Single-camera
- Running time: 24 mins.
- Production company: Mark VII Limited

Original release
- Network: CBS
- Release: March 14 – April 18, 1978

Sam is an American crime drama television series that aired on the CBS network from March 14 to April 18, 1978, for six episodes. It told the story of a Los Angeles police officer, Mike Breen (played by Mark Harmon), and his specially-trained police dog, Sam, a Labrador Retriever.

== Synopsis ==
In the series, Sam assisted Breen in cases such as rescues, drug smuggling, and bomb threats. Also starring were Len Wayland as Breen's supervisor, Captain Tom Clagett, and Gary Crosby as Captain Gene Cody.

== Production notes ==
Sam was the brainchild of television producer Jack Webb, whose Mark VII Limited packaged the show for Universal Television. Much like Webb's earlier Adam-12, several incidents per episode were featured. Further, Wayland and Crosby appeared in numerous Mark VII productions previously. James Doherty and Leonard B. Kaufman were the producers; Webb and Paul Donnelly served as executive producers. Only six episodes were broadcast.

CBS aired Sam as a replacement series for the 1977 Celebrity Challenge of the Sexes. Sam aired opposite ABC's sitcom Happy Days; Happy Days easily outranked Sam in the ratings, with Project U.F.O. (on Sundays) also having better ratings during the season.

This would be the last television series to debut that was produced by Jack Webb, who died in 1982. Also, the final television appearance of Vivian Vance was featured in episode #1.6.
