= Charlie Grace (TV series) =

1995 American TV series

- Genre: Crime drama
- Created by: Robert Singer
- Starring: Mark Harmon; Cindy Katz; Leelee Sobieski
- Composer: Jay Gruska
- Country of origin: United States
- Original language: English
- No. of seasons: 1
- No. of episodes: 9

Production
- Executive producer: Robert Singer
- Producers: Mark Harmon; Jim Michaels; Frank Renzulli; William Schmidt
- Running time: 60 minutes
- Production companies: Wings Productions; December 3rd Productions; Warner Bros. Television

Original release
- Network: ABC
- Release: September 14 – November 9, 1995

Charlie Grace is an American crime drama television series created by Robert Singer that aired on ABC from September 14 to November 9, 1995.

== Premise ==
Charlie was kicked off the force for busting fellow officers, and now he is a divorced private investigator who has to solve cases while taking care of his daughter.

== Cast ==
- Mark Harmon as Charlie Grace
- Cindy Katz as Leslie Loeb
- Leelee Sobieski as Jenny Grace
- Robert Costanzo as Artie Crawford

== Episodes ==
No.	Title	Directed by	Written by	Original release date
1	"Take Me to the Pilot"	Robert Singer	Robert Singer	September 14, 1995
Earl "Mad Dog" Jonas, a criminal who Charlie arrested eight years previously for committing a payroll heist at Stanford, and whom vowed revenge against Charlie, is released from prison. Charlie's old friend Captain Rios puts Charlie under police protection, but when Jonas is murdered Charlie becomes the main suspect in the case. While the police focus on Charlie, he decides to investigate Jonas' murder himself. Charlie visits Jonas' girlfriend at home, and while he is talking to her, she is shot dead through a window from the street. The following night, Charlie is shot at while driving home and embarks on a car chase until the shooter crashes his car into an telephone pole and explodes. Charlie uncovers phone records of Rios's lawyer son Guillermo making calls to Mad Dog's and his girlfriend's killer, and confronts Captain Rios with the information, claiming that Mad Dog owed Guillermo money from when Mad Dog robbed the payroll truck with help from an inside man at Stanford – security officer William Rivers, aka Guillermo Rios. Charlie realizes that eight years ago the Captain persuaded Mad Dog to take the fall alone for the heist to protect his son. Charlie convinces the Captain to do the right thing and turn himself and his son in.
2	"Pilot"	Robert Singer	Robert Singer	September 21, 1995
Charlie has to take in his 12-year-old daughter when his ex-wife is accused of murder.
3	"Bring Me the Head of Darnell Sims"	Randall Zisk	Kathy McCormick	September 28, 1995
Charlie and Crawford have to find a star witness.
4	"The Kid"	Davis Guggenheim	Frank Renzulli	October 5, 1995
Charlie helps a mother and her abused daughter. Jenny doesn't like that Charlie has to work so much.
5	"Designer Knock-off"	Randall Zisk	William Schmidt	October 12, 1995
Charlie is hired to find the killer of a fashion designer.
6	"One Simple Little Favor"	Geoffrey Nottage	Anne Collins	October 19, 1995
Charlie gets in trouble with a mob boss.
7	"I've Got a Secret"	Robert Singer	Kathy McCormick	October 26, 1995
Charlie is the only one who can save Leslie when she gets in trouble. Jenny's grandparents want her to move in with them instead of living with Charlie.
8	"It's in the Cards, Charlie"	Philip Sgriccia	Terence Winter	November 2, 1995
A major mob boss is robbed by small-time criminals.
9	"Steal One for the Gipper"	Michael Lange	Unknown	November 9, 1995
A valuable piece of sports memorabilia is stolen. Guest appearances by Steve Garvey, Franco Harris, Lynn Swann and Dick Butkus.
