= Kristin Nelson =

American actress and painter (1945–2018)

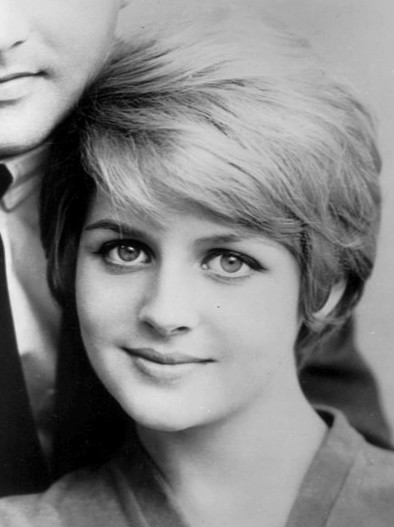
- Nelson in 1964
- Born: Sharon Kristin Harmon; June 25, 1945; Burbank, California, U.S.
- Died: April 27, 2018 (aged 72); Santa Fe, New Mexico, U.S.
- Other name: Kristin Nelson Tinker
- Occupations: Actress; painter; author
- Spouses: Ricky Nelson (m. 1963; div. 1982) Mark Tinker (m. 1988; div. 2000)
- Children: 4, including Tracy, Matthew, and Gunnar
- Parent(s): Tom Harmon; Elyse Knox
- Relatives: Mark Harmon (brother); Kelly Harmon (sister); Pam Dawber (sister-in-law); Harriet Hilliard Nelson (mother-in-law); Ozzie Nelson (father-in-law); David Nelson (brother-in-law); John DeLorean (brother-in-law)

Sharon Kristin Harmon Nelson (née Harmon; June 25, 1945 – April 27, 2018) was an American painter, actress, and author. Sister of actors Mark Harmon and Kelly Harmon, she was married to actor and musician Ricky Nelson for 19 years.

== Early life ==
Kristin was the daughter of American football star Tom Harmon and model and actress Elyse Knox. Her younger siblings are model and actress Kelly Harmon and actor Mark Harmon. Her father was of Irish descent, while her maternal grandparents were Austrian immigrants.

She attended Marymount High School, an all-girls Catholic school in Bel Air, Los Angeles, CA, along with other children of celebrities including Mia Farrow, who was one of her closest school friends. In 1963, at age 17, she married teen idol Ricky Nelson and gave birth to their first child six months later.

== Career ==
=== Acting ===
Following her marriage to Rick in 1963, she joined him and his family on their television show The Adventures of Ozzie and Harriet as a regular cast member, first appearing in the episode "Rick's Wedding Ring". In 1965, she co-starred with Rick in the romantic comedy Love and Kisses, in which they demonstrated the troubles of a young couple of school age who get married—an "inspired casting", according to one critic.

She played police officer Jim Reed's wife Jean on Adam-12, guest-starred on other series and appeared in a few theatrical films, including The Resurrection of Broncho Billy, which won an Academy Award for best live-action short film. She retired from acting in 1982 following Liar's Moon.

== Filmography ==
=== Film ===
Year	Title	Role	Notes
1965	Love and Kisses	Rosemary Cotts	Feature film
1967	What Am I Bid?	Beth Hubbard (credited as Kristin Nelson)	Feature film
1970	The Resurrection of Broncho Billy	The Girl (credited as Kristin Nelson)	Short film
1975	Sonic Boom	Audrey Maginni (credited as Kristin Nelson)	Short film
1982	Liar's Moon	Prostitute #1 (credited as Kristin Nelson)	Feature film

=== Television ===
Year	Title	Role	Notes
1963–1966	The Adventures of Ozzie and Harriet	Kris Nelson	Regular cast member (31 episodes)
1969	The Over-the-Hill Gang	Hannah Rose (credited as Kris Nelson)	Television movie (ABC)
1970	Green Acres	Carol Kenworthy (credited as Kris Nelson)	Episode: "Eb's Double Trouble"
1975	Adam-12	Jean Reed (credited as Kristin Nelson)	Episode: "Lady's Night"; Episode: "Something Worth Dying For: Part 1"; Episode: "Something Worth Dying For: Part 2"

=== Art ===
Kristin Nelson. Mother May I?

Kristin had painted since the age of 17, and had her first one-woman art show in 1967. Her work was described as "widely acclaimed" and has been likened to that of Grandma Moses. Her oil paintings sold for up to $5,000 in the 1970s.

Kristin's brightly colored compositions found favor with Jacqueline Kennedy, Mia Farrow, Tyne Daly, Dwight Yoakam and other celebrities. Her art career received a boost when Kennedy purchased her painting When the Kennedys Were in the White House.

Her paintings are conceived without perspective and are brightly colored with many figures included. Subjects include When the Kennedys Were in the White House (1964) and The Day He Died (1990), a memorial to her father painted on a window frame that depicts a country church and rain clouds. In 1999, her paintings were published in a coffee-table-sized autobiography, Out of My Mind. The paintings document her life story and are supplemented with diary entries and poems. In 1988, she met director-producer Mark Tinker, who asked her what she wanted to do with her life. She told him, "I want to paint."

== Personal life ==
=== Marriage to Rick Nelson ===
Kristin first met Ricky Nelson when she was "just another 12-year-old fan" of his. They began dating on Christmas Day 1961, when she was 16 and Rick was 21. A year later, the couple announced their engagement. They were married on April 20, 1963, in a Catholic ceremony at St. Martin of Tours Catholic Church in Los Angeles. Nelson was pregnant, and Rick later described the union as a "shotgun wedding". Rick, a non-practicing Protestant, received instruction in Catholicism before the wedding and signed a pledge to have any children of the union baptized in the Catholic faith. The couple went on to have three more children, but their extravagant lifestyle forced Rick to tour for long periods, placing great pressure on the marriage. By 1975, the Nelsons were on the verge of breaking up. When Rick returned from a tour in 1977, he discovered Kristin had moved him out of their home and into a rented house. Less than a month later, she found him there with two Los Angeles Rams cheerleaders. Rick later claimed that she had set him up to use the incident against him in court.

In October 1977, Kristin filed for divorce and asked for alimony, custody of their four children and a portion of community property, but the couple temporarily reconciled. In April 1980, the couple bought an estate on Mulholland Drive, originally owned by Errol Flynn, for $750,000. Kristin wanted Rick to give up music, spend more time at home, and focus on acting, but Rick continued touring relentlessly. The dispute over Nelson's career created unpleasantness at home. In October 1980, Kristin again filed for divorce. Attempts to negotiate a preliminary settlement agreement were unsuccessful. In February 1981, Nelson was temporarily granted custody of the children and $3,600 monthly spousal support. Rick was required to pay family expenses such as property taxes, medical bills, and school tuition. Kristin claimed Rick was hiding assets, but in fact he was reportedly almost broke. Each accused the other of drug and alcohol abuse and of being a poor parent. After two years of acrimony, the couple was divorced in December 1982. The divorce was financially devastating for Rick, with attorneys and accountants taking more than $1 million.

Speaking in a 1998 documentary about the Nelson family, Ozzie and Harriet: The Adventures of America's Favorite Family, Kristin said of her marriage to Rick: "I spent my whole life fighting the fairy tale. First trying to be it, then trying to tell the truth."

=== Children ===
Kristin and Rick Nelson had four children. Their daughter, Tracy, was born six months after the wedding on October 25, 1963, at St. John's Hospital in Santa Monica, California. She weighed four pounds, one ounce, and was slightly premature. As a preschooler, Tracy appeared in Yours, Mine, and Ours with Lucille Ball. In her teens, she attended the exclusive Westlake School for Girls. During her parents' marital difficulties, she stayed with her father at the Mulholland Drive house. Tracy went on to become a professional dancer as well as a successful film and television actress.

Twin sons, Gunnar Eric Nelson and Matthew Gray Nelson, were born on September 20, 1967. They moved in with their father as soon as they turned 18, three months before his death. Shortly after, they formed the band Nelson.

Their fourth child, Sam Hilliard Nelson, was born on August 29, 1974. At six years of age, he was placed in the care of his maternal grandparents and became the subject of a custody battle between Kristin Nelson and her brother, actor Mark Harmon in 1987, when he accused her of being an unfit parent. Sam earned a degree in psychology and a minor in film from Boston College and has been working in the music business.

After Rick Nelson's death in a plane crash in 1985, his four children inherited what was left of his estate.

=== Custody case ===
In 1987, two years after Rick Nelson's death, Kristin Nelson was undergoing drug rehabilitation when her brother Mark Harmon and his wife Pam Dawber petitioned for custody of Kristin's youngest son Sam, on the grounds that Kristin was incapable of good parenting. Sam's psychiatrist testified that the 13-year-old boy depicted his mother as a dragon and complained about her mood swings and how she prevented him from being with his siblings. During his parents' divorce battle between 1980 and 1982, Sam was under the care of his aunt Kelly before moving in with his grandparents for 18 months and eventually going to live with Harmon and his family. Harmon dropped the custody petition after his sister made allegations of cocaine use by Dawber. Nelson retained custody, although Harmon was granted visitation rights. Nelson, her brother Mark and her son Sam also agreed to enter family therapy.

=== Marriage to Mark Tinker ===
Nelson married TV producer and director Mark Tinker in 1988. After the divorce, Nelson moved to Santa Fe, New Mexico.

== Death ==
Kristin Nelson died of a heart attack at her home in Santa Fe, New Mexico, on April 27, 2018. Her daughter Tracy confirmed her death on Facebook four days later, writing that "her heaven would be her dogs, sushi, and a Santa Fe sky."
