= Prince of Bel Air =

- Genre: Comedy; Romance
- Written by: Dori Pierson; Marc Reid Rubel
- Directed by: Charles Braverman
- Starring: Mark Harmon; Kirstie Alley; Robert Vaughn; Patrick Labyorteaux
- Music by: Robert Folk
- Country of origin: United States
- Original language: English

Production
- Executive producer: Leonard Hill
- Producer: Albert J. Salzer
- Cinematography: Hanania Baer
- Editor: Daniel Cahn
- Running time: 95 minutes
- Production company: Leonard Hill Films

Original release
- Network: ABC
- Release: January 20, 1986

Prince of Bel Air is a 1986 American made-for-television romantic comedy film starring Mark Harmon, Kirstie Alley, and Robert Vaughn. It first aired on ABC on January 20, 1986.

Harmon, Alley, Patrick Labyorteaux, and Dean Cameron reunited the following year for the theatrical film Summer School.

== Premise ==
A Los Angeles pool cleaner accustomed to living a womanizing lifestyle runs into a challenge when he meets a wealthy, attractive new love interest.

== Cast ==
- Mark Harmon as Robin Prince
- Kirstie Alley as Jamie Harrison
- Robert Vaughn as Stanley Auerbach
- Patrick Labyorteaux as Justin
- Bartley Braverman as Larry Kampion
- Deborah Harmon as Carol Kampion
- Katherine Moffat as Kelli
- Scott Getlin as Steve Cooper
- Michael Horton as Michael Jacobs
- Jonathan Stark as Brad Griffin
- Sherry Hursey as Sandi
- Lisanne Falk as Stacy
- Dean Cameron as Willard
- Don Swayze as Darryl
- Barbara Crampton as Anne White
- Leslie Winston as Terry White

== European version ==
The version for European theatrical exhibition includes one brief scene with two actresses, Barbara Crampton and Leslie Winston, appearing topless. In the non-European version, this same scene only features Crampton without Winston but Crampton is fully clothed.

== Reception ==
The film received a mostly negative critical response.
