= Ruth Hussey =

American actress (1911–2005)

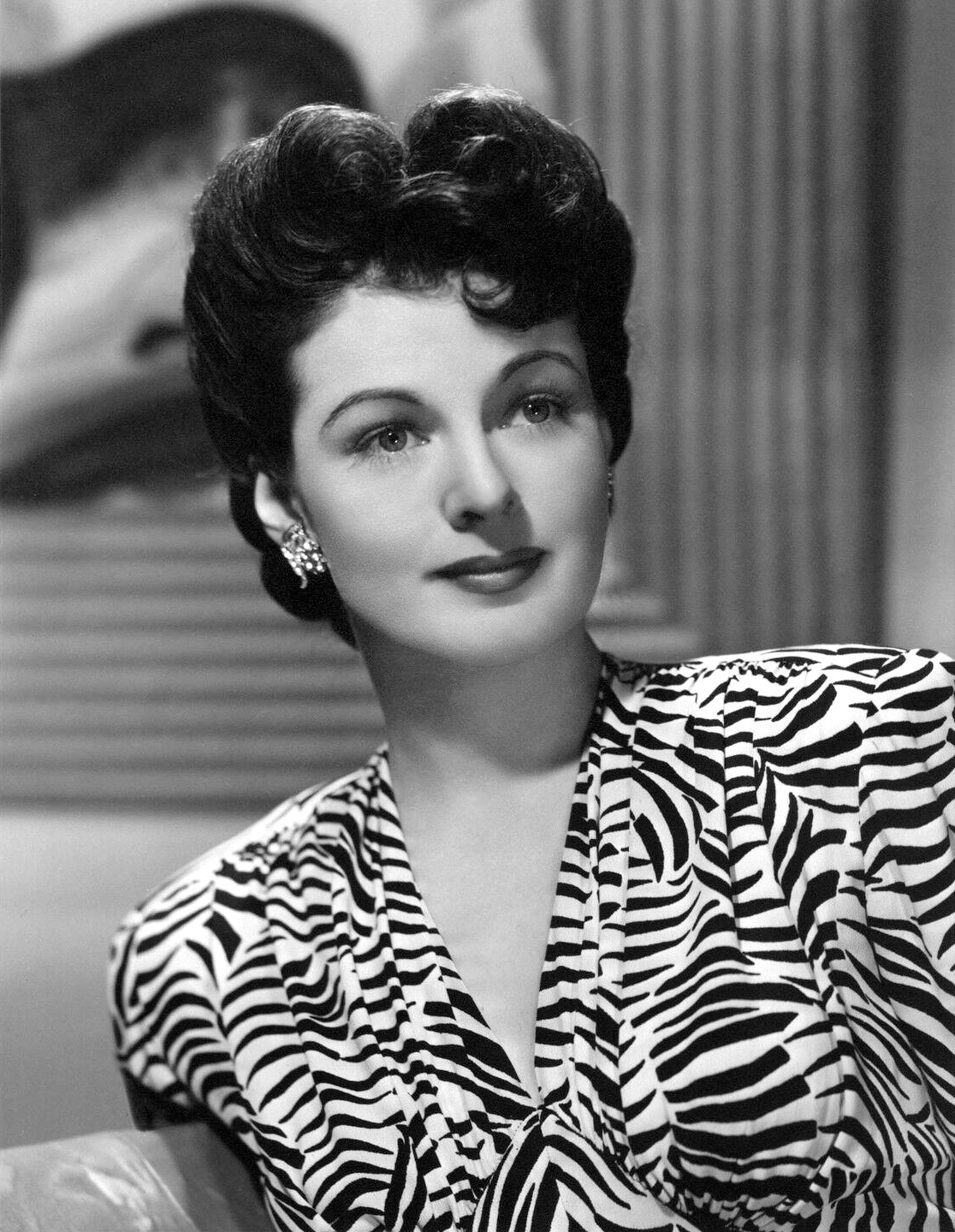
- Hussey in 1940
- Born: Ruth Carol Hussey; October 30, 1911; Providence, Rhode Island, U.S.
- Died: April 19, 2005 (aged 93); Newbury Park, California, U.S.
- Education: Pembroke College in Brown University; University of Michigan
- Occupation: Actress
- Years active: 1937–1973
- Spouse: Charles Robert Longenecker (m. 1942; died 2002)
- Children: 3; including John Longenecker

Ruth Carol Hussey (October 30, 1911 – April 19, 2005) was an American actress best known for her Academy Award-nominated role as photographer Elizabeth Imbrie in The Philadelphia Story.

== Early life ==
Hussey was born in Providence, Rhode Island on October 30, 1911. She was later known as Ruth Carol O'Rourke, her stepfather's surname. Her father, George R. Hussey, died of the Spanish flu in 1918 when she was seven years old. Ten years later, her mother, Julia Corbett Hussey, married a family friend, William O'Rourke, who had worked at the family's mail-order silver enterprise. She had an older brother, Robert, and a younger sister, Betty.

After receiving her early education in Providence public schools, Hussey studied art at Pembroke College and graduated in 1936. She did not win roles for any of the plays for which she had auditioned at Pembroke. She received a degree in theatre from the University of Michigan and worked as an actress with a summer-stock company in Michigan for two seasons. She also attended Boston Business College.

== Career ==
Hussey in a 1951 advertisement for Motorola televisions

After working as an actress in summer stock, Hussey returned to Providence and was a fashion commentator on a local radio station. She wrote ad copy for a local clothing store and read it on the radio each afternoon. She was encouraged by a friend to audition for acting roles at the Providence Playhouse, but the theater director rejected her, saying that the roles were cast only out of New York City. Later that week, she traveled to New York, and on her first day there, she signed with a talent agent who booked her for a role in a play starting the next day at the Providence Playhouse.

In New York, she worked for a time as a model, then landed a number of stage roles with touring companies. While touring the country in 1937 with Dead End, Hussey was spotted on opening night at the Biltmore Hotel in Los Angeles by MGM talent scout Billy Grady. MGM signed her to a contract and she made her film debut later that year. She quickly became a leading lady in MGM's "B" unit, usually playing sophisticated, worldly roles.

Hussey's breakout role was as Elizabeth Imbrie, the cynical magazine photographer in The Philadelphia Story (1940), for which she was nominated for an Academy Award for Best Actress in a Supporting Role. In 1941, theater exhibitors voted her the third-most-popular new star in Hollywood.

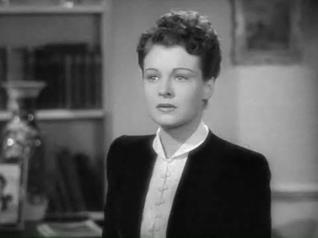
Hussey in The Philadelphia Story (1940)

Hussey worked with Robert Taylor in Flight Command (1940), Robert Young in Northwest Passage (1940) and H. M. Pulham, Esq. (1941), Van Heflin in Tennessee Johnson (1942), Ray Milland in The Uninvited (1944) and Alan Ladd in The Great Gatsby (1949). In 1943 she worked with Ginger Rogers in "Tender Comrade" where she stands out for a rant about rationing during World War Two.

In 1946, Hussey starred on Broadway in the Pulitzer Prize-winning play State of the Union. Her 1949 role in Goodbye, My Fancy on Broadway caused a Billboard reviewer to write: "Miss Hussey brings a splendid aliveness and warmth to the lovely congresswoman...."

Hussey played Jean Arthur's role of Miriam Starrett in the 1955 Lux Radio Theater presentation of Shane, playing alongside the film’s original stars Ladd and Heflin.

In 1960, she co-starred in The Facts of Life with Bob Hope and Lucille Ball. Hussey was also active in early television drama.

== Personal life ==
Hussey and husband Bob Longenecker

On August 9, 1942, Hussey married talent agent and radio producer C. Robert "Bob" Longenecker (1909–2002) at Mission San Antonio de Pala in north San Diego County, California. They raised three children: George Longenecker (b. 1944), John Longenecker (b. 1947) and Mary Elizabeth Longenecker (b. July 17, 1953).

Following the birth of her children, Hussey focused on family activities and in 1964, she designed a family cabin in the mountain community of Lake Arrowhead, California. In 1967, she was inducted into the Rhode Island Heritage Hall of Fame.

In 1977, Hussey and her husband moved from their Brentwood family home to Rancho Carlsbad in Carlsbad, California. Her husband died in 2002 shortly after their 60th wedding anniversary.

Her son John Longenecker worked as a cinematographer and film director. He won an Academy Award for producing the live-action short film The Resurrection of Broncho Billy (1970).

Hussey was also active in Catholic charities, was noted for painting in watercolors and was a lifelong Democrat although she voted for Republican Thomas Dewey in 1944 and for Hollywood friend and former costar Ronald Reagan in the 1980 and 1984 presidential elections.

== Death ==
Hussey died on April 19, 2005, at the age of 93 from complications from an appendectomy. She is interred at Pierce Brothers Valley Oaks Memorial Park in Westlake Village, California.

== Radio appearances ==
Year	Program	Episode/source
1943	The Screen Guild Theater	"Tennessee Johnson"
1949	Hallmark Playhouse	"Parnassus on Wheels"
1952	Family Theater	"Vacation for Mom"
1952	Hollywood Star Playhouse	"All Brides Are Beautiful"
1953	Family Theater	"Namgay Doola"
