= Kelly Harmon =

American actress and model (born 1948)

- Born: Kelly Jean Harmon; November 9, 1948 (age 77); Burbank, California, U.S.
- Occupations: Actress, model
- Years active: 1962–1984
- Spouses: John DeLorean (m. 1969; div. 1972) Robert L. "Bob" Miller (m. 1984)
- Parent(s): Tom Harmon; Elyse Knox
- Relatives: Kristin Nelson (sister); Mark Harmon (brother); Tracy Nelson (niece); Matthew Nelson (nephew); Gunnar Nelson (nephew); Ricky Nelson (brother-in-law)

Kelly Jean Harmon Miller (née Harmon; born November 9, 1948) is an American actress and model, best known for appearing in a series of television commercials for Tic Tac mints. She was a regular on the 1983 NBC series Bay City Blues, playing the role of Sunny Hayward. She also made guest appearances on many TV shows, including Battlestar Galactica, CHiPS, One Day at a Time, and T.J. Hooker. Harmon also appeared in many commercials, including a series of "remarkable mouth" spots used by WRIF radio in Detroit.

Harmon has her own interior design company in Los Angeles. Her work has been featured in lifestyle magazines such as Town & Country and House Beautiful.

== Personal life ==
Harmon is the middle of three children, the younger daughter of football star and sportscaster Tom Harmon and actress Elyse Knox. Her brother Mark is an actor and sister Kristin was an actress-turned-painter. Her father was of Irish descent, while her maternal grandparents were Austrian immigrants.

On May 31, 1969, Harmon married automotive executive John DeLorean. They separated in 1971 and divorced the following year. On June 23, 1984, she married Robert L. "Bob" Miller, an L.A.-based publishing entrepreneur, combining three children from previous marriages.

== Filmography ==
=== Film ===
Year	Title	Role	Notes
1973	Jonathan Livingston Seagull	Kimmy (voice only)	Feature film
1978	California Suite	Stewardess	Feature film

=== Television ===
Year	Title	Role	Notes
1962	The New Loretta Young Show	Teedee Doley	Episode: "Two of a Kind"
1976	Switch	Bobbi Robbins	Episode: "The Girl on the Golden Strip"; Episode: "Death Squad"
1979	Battlestar Galactica	Sarah	Episode: "Greetings from Earth" (2-hour episode)
1979	CHiPs	Candi Wright	Episode: "Drive, Lady, Drive: Part 1"; Episode: "Drive, Lady, Drive: Part 2"
1980	Barnaby Jones	Laurie	Episode: "Focus on Fear"
1980	The Incredible Hulk	Jean	Episode: "Free Fall"
1981	Nero Wolfe	Susan Ormond	Episode: "To Catch a Dead Man"
1981	One Day at a Time	Kathy	Episode: "Julie Shows Up: Part 1"
1981	The Young and the Restless	Dr. Jane Lewis	Daytime serial (recurring role) # of episodes unknown
1982	T.J. Hooker	Jennifer	Episode: "The Protectors"
1983-1984	Bay City Blues	Sunny Hayward	Series regular (8 episodes)
1984	The Master	Allison Grant	Episode: "Kunoichi"
