= The Resurrection of Broncho Billy =

1970 film

- Poster
- Directed by: James R. Rokos
- Written by: John Carpenter; Nick Castle; Jim R. Rokos; John Longenecker; Trace Johnston
- Produced by: John Longenecker
- Starring: Johnny Crawford; Kristin Nelson
- Narrated by: Ruth Hussey; Ricky Nelson
- Cinematography: Nick Castle
- Edited by: John Carpenter
- Music by: John Carpenter
- Production companies: Super Crew; University of Southern California
- Distributed by: Universal Pictures
- Release date: July 11, 1970 (New York City)
- Running time: 23 minutes
- Country: United States
- Language: English
- Budget: $2,500

The Resurrection of Broncho Billy is a 1970 live action short Western film directed by James R. Rokos and starring Johnny Crawford. It won an Oscar for Best Short Subject.

It was one of John Carpenter's first works; he acted as editor, composer of the music and co-writer of the film.

== Plot ==
The Resurrection of Broncho Billy is the story of a young man (Johnny Crawford) who lives in a big city in the present time, but his dreams are of the Old West and its film heroes. Scenes of his everyday life take on the style of a Western film as he visits with old timer Wild Bill Tucker; he crosses a busy boulevard packed with traffic and we hear the sound of a cattle drive; he's late for work at the hardware store; at an intersection crosswalk he has a Western street showdown with a businessman as the light changes; he enters a saloon but has no I.D. for a beer; he is accosted in an alleyway; a pretty counter girl (Merry Scanlon) gives him soda but he realizes he has no money to pay for it.

Then he meets a lovely artist (Kristin Nelson) in a park who draws a sketch of him in an Old West setting, and he talks to her for a time on a park bench about the Old West and Western films. The Artist gets up to leave and we hear the sound of hoofbeats as he rides up to her in the Old West. The artist gives him back the watch he lost in the alley scuffle, she floats up onto his horse and they ride off across the prairie as the Broncho Billy theme song is heard over the scene. He's taken her back to the magic Old West that he loves.

== Production notes ==
Producer John Longenecker was attending a USC Cinema 480 undergraduate production course at USC where he produced The Resurrection of Broncho Billy. The Super Crew was the name given to the group of filmmakers Longenecker brought together at USC, and each of the four filmmakers made contributions to the story. Nick Castle was the cinematographer, John Carpenter was the film editor and wrote the original theme music for the picture, and James Rokos was the film's director. Many of the scenes were filmed in a neighbor's attic, Crystal Salapatas, in Brentwood on Oakmont Drive.

== Release ==
Johnny Crawford and John Longenecker invited executives at Universal Studios to release the picture theatrically. It opened on December 25, 1970, in Westwood Village at the Mann Theatres National for what was intended as a one-week Academy Award qualifying run. The theater continued to play the film for fourteen weeks. After winning an Oscar (with Longenecker being the youngest producer to win an Oscar at 23 years old), Universal Studios distributed the short film with their feature movies for the next two years throughout the United States and Canada.

== See also ==
- List of American films of 1970
- Western genre
- Broncho Billy Anderson
