= Local Boys =

- Directed by: Ron Moler
- Written by: Norman Douglas Bradley; Thomas Matthew Stewart; Ron Moler
- Screenplay by: Norman Douglas Bradley; Thomas Matthew Stewart; Ron Moler
- Story by: Norman Douglas Bradley; Thomas Matthew Stewart
- Produced by: Ron Moler
- Starring: Jeremy Sumpter; Eric Christian Olsen
- Cinematography: Robert Edesa; James Glennon
- Edited by: Terry Blythe
- Music by: Hal Lindes
- Production company: Capstone Pictures
- Distributed by: First Look Studios
- Release date: February 23, 2002
- Running time: 102 minutes
- Country: United States
- Language: English

Local Boys is a 2002 American coming-of-age drama film. The film was directed by Ron Moler and written by Norman Douglas Bradley and Thomas Matthew Stewart. The film stars Jeremy Sumpter and Eric Christian Olsen as two brothers who face new challenges and adventures over the course of a memorable summer along with their buddies.

== Plot ==
The story centers on brothers 16 yr old Randy (Olsen) and 12 yr old Skeet (Sumpter) as they spend the summer surfing. Skeet receives his first surfboard from Randy for his 12th birthday, leading to adventures and parties. Randy's attention shifts to a new girl, Samantha, while their mother's new boyfriend, Jim (Harmon), creates tension, especially with Randy. Skeet finds a mentor in surfing legend Jim Wesley, who gives him lessons. The film explores the brothers' relationship as they deal with their father's death and the influence of Jim, who eventually begins a relationship with their mother.

== Cast ==
- Jeremy Sumpter as "Skeet" Dobson
- Eric Christian Olsen as Randy Dobson
- Mark Harmon as Jim Wesley
- Stacy Edwards as Jessica Dobson
- Giuseppe Andrews as Willy
- Allison Munn as Allison
- Chaka Forman as Da Cat
- Lukas Behnken as Zack
- Archie Kao as David Kamelamela
- Shelby Fenner as Samantha

== Production ==
The filming was on the beaches of Los Angeles, California in 2001.
