= John DeLorean =

American automobile engineer and executive (1925–2005)

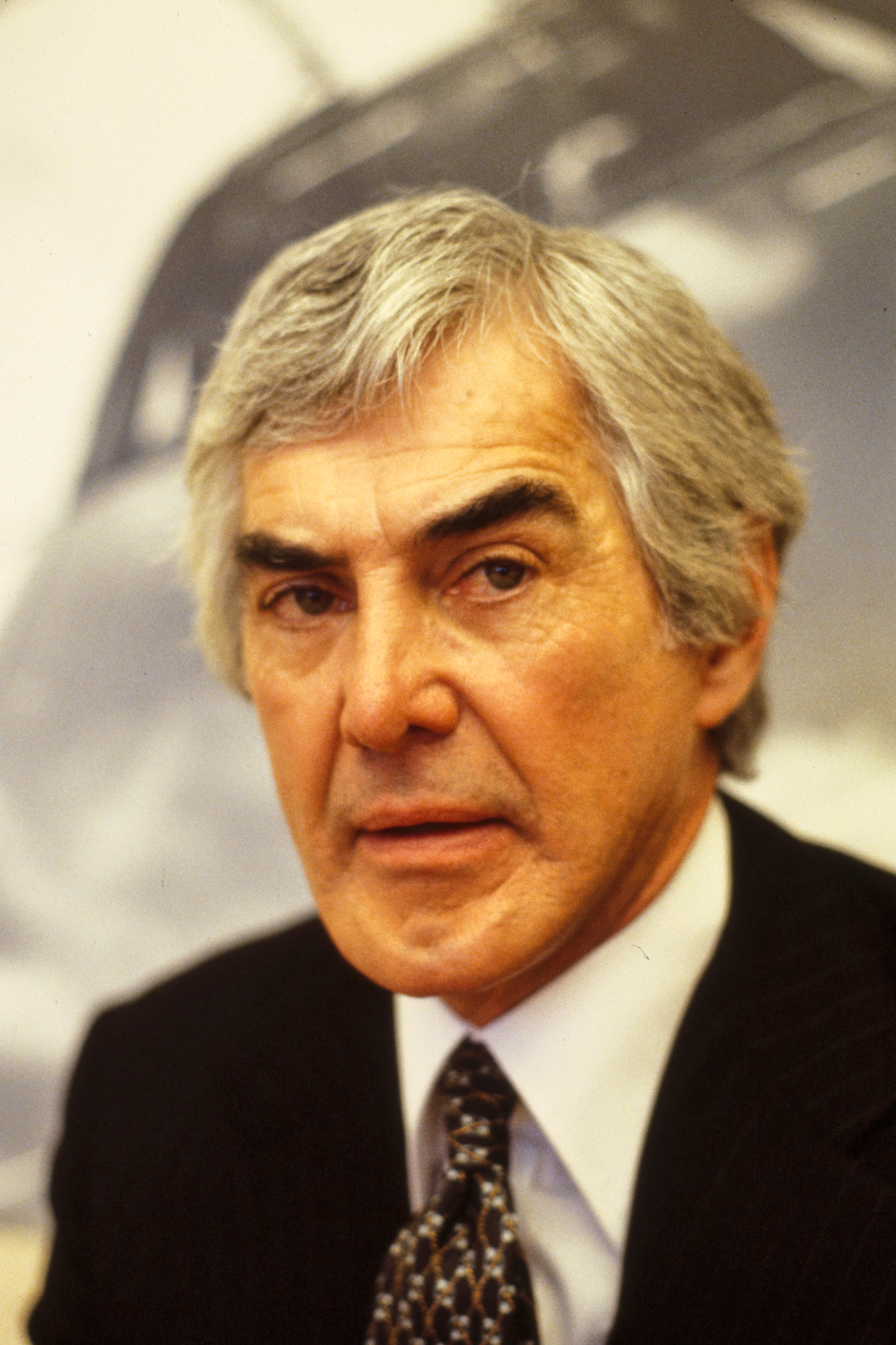
- DeLorean in 1981
- Born: John Zachary DeLorean; January 6, 1925; Detroit, Michigan, U.S.
- Died: March 19, 2005 (aged 80); Summit, New Jersey, U.S.
- Education: Lawrence Institute of Technology (BS); Chrysler Institute of Engineering (MS); University of Michigan (MBA)
- Occupations: Automobile engineer and executive
- Known for: DeLorean Motor Company
- Spouses: Elizabeth Higgins (m. 1954; div. 1969) Kelly Harmon (m. 1969; div. 1972) Cristina Ferrare (m. 1973; div. 1985) Sally Baldwin (m. 2002)
- Children: 3

John Zachary DeLorean (/dəˈlɔːriən/ də-LOR-ee-ən; January 6, 1925 – March 19, 2005) was an American engineer, inventor, and executive in the U.S. automobile industry. He is widely known as founder of the DeLorean Motor Company, as well as for his work at General Motors.

DeLorean managed the development of several vehicles throughout his career, including the Pontiac GTO, Pontiac Firebird, Pontiac Grand Prix, Chevrolet Cosworth Vega, and DMC DeLorean, which was featured in the 1985 film Back to the Future. He was the youngest division chief in General Motors history and then left to start the DeLorean Motor Company (DMC) in 1973. Production delays meant that DMC's first car did not reach the consumer market until 1981, when a depressed buying market was compounded by lukewarm reviews from critics and the public. After a year, the DeLorean had failed to recover its $175 million investment costs, unsold cars accumulated, and the company was in financial trouble.

In October 1982, DeLorean was charged with cocaine trafficking after FBI informant James Hoffman solicited him as financier in a scheme to sell 220 lb (100 kg) of cocaine worth approximately $24 million. DMC was insolvent at the time and $17 million in debt. Hoffman had approached DeLorean, a man he barely knew with no prior criminal record, and DeLorean was able to successfully defend himself at trial under the procedural defense of police entrapment. The trial ended in a not guilty verdict in August 1984, by which time DMC had filed for bankruptcy and ceased operations.

== Early life ==
DeLorean was born in Detroit, the eldest of four sons of Zachary and Kathryn (née Pribák) DeLorean. His father, a mill worker, was Romanian, born Zaharia Delorean (Romanian pronunciation: [deloˈre̯an]) in the village of Sugág, Alsó-Fehér County, Austria-Hungary (currently Șugag, Alba County, Romania) and immigrated to the United States when he was 20. He spent time in Montana and Gary, Indiana, before moving to Michigan. By the time John was born, Zachary had found employment as a union organizer at the Ford Motor Company factory in nearby Highland Park. His poor English skills and lack of education prevented him from obtaining higher-paid work. When not required at Ford, he occasionally worked as a carpenter.

DeLorean's mother was a Hungarian citizen of Hungarian origin. She was employed at the Carboloy Products Division of General Electric throughout much of DeLorean's early life. She took work wherever she could to supplement the family's income. She generally tolerated Zachary's intermittent episodes of erratic behavior; but during several of his more violent periods, she took her sons to live with her sister in Los Angeles, where they stayed for a year or so at a time. DeLorean's parents divorced in 1942. John subsequently saw little of his father, who moved into a boarding house and became a solitary and estranged drug addict.

== Education ==
After attending Detroit's public schools, DeLorean was accepted into Cass Technical High School, a school for Detroit honor students, where he signed up for the electrical curriculum. He found it exhilarating and excelled at his studies. His academic record and musical talents earned him a scholarship at Lawrence Institute of Technology in Highland Park, today Lawrence Technological University in Southfield. The small college was the alma mater of some of the automobile industry's best engineers.

World War II interrupted his studies. He was drafted for military service and served three years in the U.S. Army. He received an honorable discharge in 1946 and returned to Detroit to find his mother and siblings in economic difficulty. He worked as a draftsman for the Public Lighting Commission for a year and a half to improve his family's financial status then returned to Lawrence to finish his degree. While back in college, he worked part-time at Chrysler and at a local body shop. He graduated in 1948 with a Bachelor of Science degree in Industrial Engineering.

Instead of immediately entering the engineering workforce, DeLorean sold life insurance. He developed an analytical system aimed at engineers and sold "about $850,000 worth of policies in ten months". He found the work boring and moved on to work for the Factory Equipment Corporation. DeLorean stated in his autobiography that he sold life insurance to improve his communication skills. Both endeavors were successful financially, but these areas held little interest for him. A foreman at Chrysler's engineering garage recommended he apply for work at Chrysler. Chrysler ran a post-graduate educational facility, the Chrysler Institute of Engineering, which allowed DeLorean to advance his education while gaining real-world experience in automotive engineering.

DeLorean briefly attended the Detroit College of Law but did not graduate. In 1952, he graduated from the Chrysler Institute with a Master of Science degree in Automotive Engineering and joined Chrysler's engineering team. He graduated from the University of Michigan with an MBA in 1956.

== Career ==
=== Packard Motor Company ===
DeLorean was at Chrysler for less than a year. In 1953, he was offered a salary of $14,000 (equivalent to US$168,470 in 2025) at Packard Motor Company under the supervision of engineer Forest McFarland. DeLorean quickly gained his new employer's attention with an improvement to the Ultramatic automatic transmission, giving it an improved torque converter and dual-drive ranges; it was relaunched as the Twin-Ultramatic.

When DeLorean joined Packard, it was experiencing financial difficulties because of the changing postwar automotive market. While Ford, General Motors, and Chrysler had begun producing affordable mainstream products designed to cater to the rising postwar middle class, Packard had retained its prewar notions of high-end, precisely engineered luxury cars. This had a positive effect on DeLorean's attention to engineering detail, and after three years at Packard he became McFarland's successor as head of research and development.

While still profitable, Packard suffered alongside other independents as it struggled to compete when Ford and General Motors engaged in a price war. James Nance, Packard's president, decided to merge the company with Studebaker Corporation in 1954. DeLorean was considering keeping his job and moving to Studebaker headquarters in South Bend, Indiana, when he received a call from Oliver K. Kelley, vice president of engineering at General Motors, whom DeLorean greatly admired. Kelley offered DeLorean his choice of a job in any of GM's five divisions.

=== General Motors ===
==== Pontiac ====
In 1956, DeLorean accepted a salary offer of $16,000 (equivalent to US$189,474 in 2025) with a bonus program, choosing to work at GM's Pontiac division as an assistant to chief engineer Pete Estes and general manager Semon "Bunkie" Knudsen. Knudsen was the son of the former president of GM, William Knudsen, who had been called away from his post to head the war mobilization production effort at the request of President Franklin D. Roosevelt. Knudsen was an MIT engineering graduate and at 42 was the youngest man to head a GM division. DeLorean and Knudsen quickly became close friends; DeLorean later cited him as a major influence and mentor. DeLorean produced dozens of patented innovations for the company and in 1961 was promoted to division chief engineer.

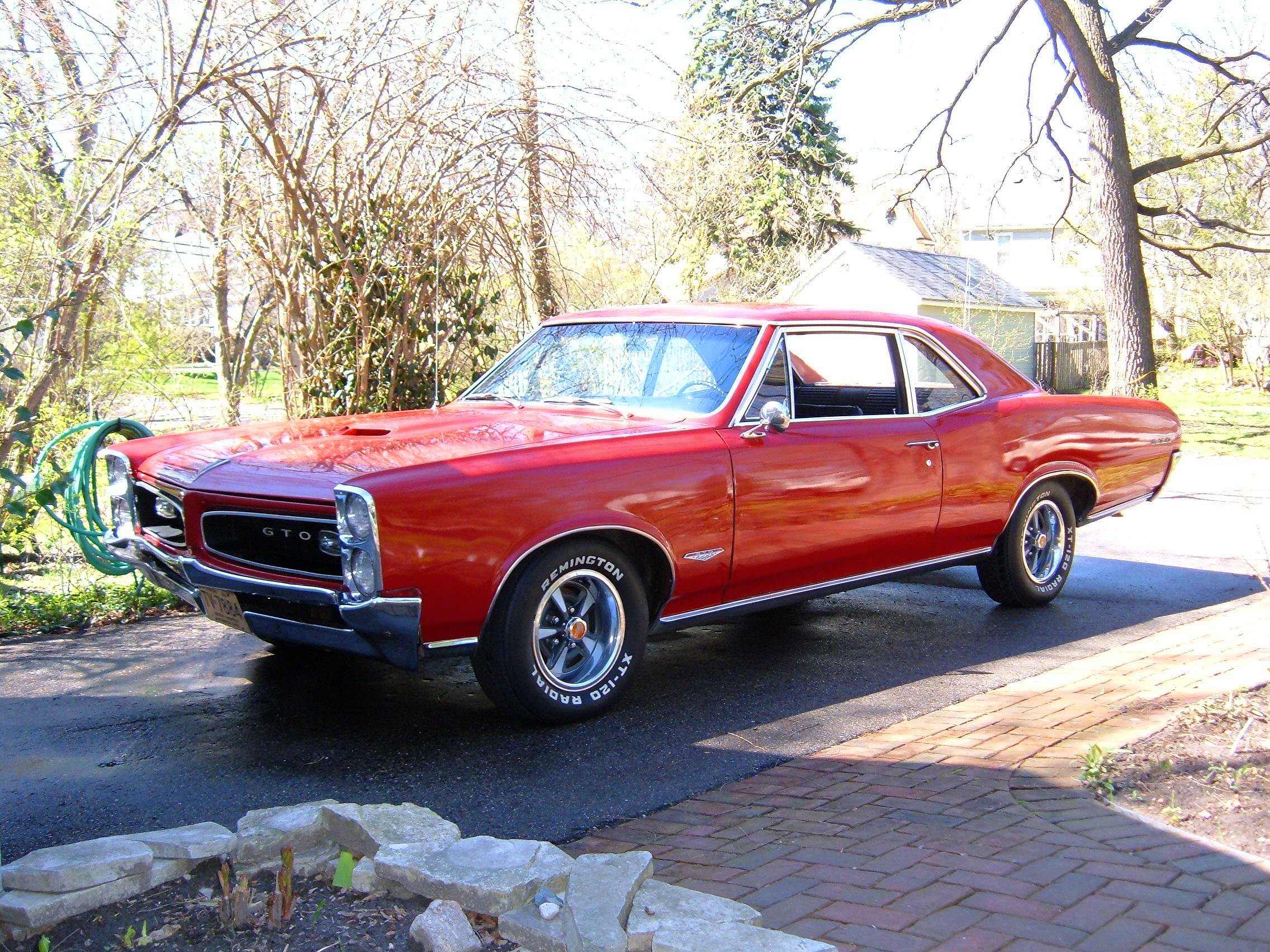
The Pontiac GTO was designed by DeLorean

DeLorean became widely known at Pontiac for the Pontiac GTO, a muscle car named after the Ferrari 250 GTO. The Pontiac brand reached third place in annual industry sales in the United States. To highlight the brand's performance emphasis, the GTO debuted as a Tempest/LeMans option package with a larger and more powerful engine in 1964. This marked the beginning of Pontiac's renaissance as GM's performance division instead of its previous position with no clear brand identity. The car and its popularity continued to grow in the following years. DeLorean received almost total credit for its success—its conception, engineering, and marketing—and was rewarded with a 1965 promotion to head of the Pontiac division.

At 40, DeLorean had broken the record for youngest division head at GM and was determined to continue his string of successes. Adapting to the frustrations he perceived in the executive offices was a difficult transition for him. He believed there was an undue amount of conflict between GM's division heads. Several of Pontiac's advertising campaign themes met with internal resistance, such as the "Tiger" campaign used to promote the GTO and other Pontiac models in 1965 and 1966. In addition, there was Ed Cole's decision to ban multiple carburetors, a method of enhancing engine performance used by Pontiac that had begun with two 4-barrel carburetors ("2×4 bbl") and Tri-Power or three 2-barrel carburetors ("3×2 bbl") in 1957.

In response to the "pony car" market dominated by the Ford Mustang, DeLorean asked GM executives for permission to market a smaller version of the Pontiac Banshee show car for 1966. However, his idea was rejected because of GM's concern that it would divert sales from the Chevrolet Corvette, their flagship performance car. Their focus was on the new Chevrolet Camaro design. Pontiac developed its version, and the Firebird was introduced for the 1967 model year.

Shortly after the Firebird's introduction, DeLorean turned his attention to the development of an all-new Grand Prix, the division's personal luxury car based on the full-sized Pontiac line. Sales were lagging by this time, but the 1969 model would have its own distinct body shell with drivetrain and chassis components from the intermediate-sized Pontiac A-body (Tempest, LeMans, GTO). DeLorean knew the Pontiac division could not finance the new car alone, so he went to his former boss, Chevrolet division head Pete Estes, and asked him to share the cost of development with Pontiac, having a one-year exclusivity before Chevrolet released the 1970 Monte Carlo. The deal was done. The 1969 Pontiac Grand Prix featured sharp bodylines and a 6-foot-long (1.8 m) hood. The interior included a wraparound cockpit-style instrument panel, bucket seats and a center console. The new model offered a sportier, high performance, somewhat smaller, and lower-priced alternative to other personal luxury cars on the market, such as the Ford Thunderbird, GM's Buick Riviera, Cadillac Eldorado, and Oldsmobile Toronado, and Ford's newly debuted Lincoln Continental Mark III. The 1969 Grand Prix production ended up at over 112,000 units, far higher than 1968's 32,000 full-sized Grand Prix.

During his time at Pontiac, DeLorean had begun to enjoy the freedom and celebrity that came with his position, and he spent a good deal of his time traveling to locations around the world to support promotional events. His frequent public appearances helped to solidify his image as a "rebel" corporate businessman, with his trendy dress style and casual banter.

Even as General Motors experienced revenue declines, Pontiac remained highly profitable under DeLorean, and despite his growing reputation as a corporate maverick, on February 15, 1969, he was promoted to head Chevrolet, General Motors' top-selling marque.

==== Chevrolet ====
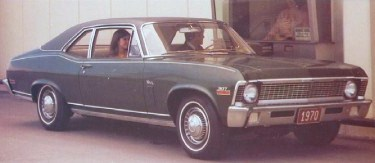
The redesigned 1970 Chevrolet Nova was released under DeLorean's leadership of GM's Chevrolet division

By this time, DeLorean earned an annual salary of $200,000 (equivalent to US$1,755,898 in 2025), with yearly bonuses of up to $400,000 (equivalent to US$3,511,797 in 2025). He was ubiquitous in popular culture. At a time when business executives were typically conservative, low-key individuals in three-piece suits, DeLorean wore long sideburns and unbuttoned shirts. He invited Ford president Lee Iacocca to serve as best man at his second wedding.

DeLorean was a limited partner in a pair of American professional sports franchises. The first was the San Diego Chargers, as part of a syndicate led by Gene Klein and Sam Schulman that bought a controlling interest for $10 million on 25 August 1966. The other was the New York Yankees of which he was one of fifteen investors led by George Steinbrenner and Michael Burke who completed the purchase from CBS for $10 million on January 3, 1973.

DeLorean continued his jet-setting lifestyle and was often seen hanging out in business and entertainment celebrity circles. He became friends with James T. Aubrey, president of Metro-Goldwyn-Mayer Studios, and was introduced to celebrities such as financier Kirk Kerkorian, Chris-Craft chairman Herb Siegel, entertainer Sammy Davis Jr., and The Tonight Show host Johnny Carson.

The executive offices of General Motors headquarters continued to clash with DeLorean's nonconformity. When he was appointed, Chevrolet was having financial and organizational troubles, and GM president Ed Cole needed a manager in that position to sort things out. The new model Camaro was due out for the 1970 model year, and it was rapidly falling behind schedule. Redesigns for the Corvette and Nova were also delayed, and unit sales had still not recovered from the past four years of turmoil, much of that because of the bad publicity surrounding the Corvair and well-publicized quality-control issues affecting other Chevy models, including defective motor mounts that led to an unprecedented recall of 6.7 million Chevrolets built between 1965 and 1969. DeLorean responded to the production problems by delaying the release of the Camaro and simplifying the modifications to the Corvette and Nova. He used the extra time to streamline Chevrolet's production overhead and reduce assembly costs. By 1971, Chevrolet was experiencing record sales in excess of 3 million vehicles, and his division alone was nearly matching that of the entire Ford Motor Company.

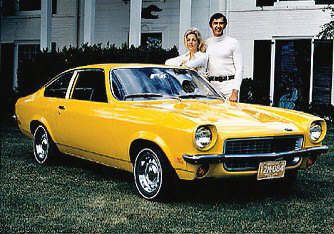
John DeLorean and the Chevrolet Vega in 1970

The Vega was assigned to Chevrolet by corporate management, specifically by Cole, just weeks before DeLorean's 1969 arrival as the Chevrolet division's general manager. In a Motor Trend interview in August 1970, DeLorean said, "Vega will be the highest quality product ever built by Chevrolet." By DeLorean's orders, dozens of extra inspectors were assigned to the Vega assembly line, and the first 2,000 cars were road-tested. He stated, "the first cars, from a manufacturing standpoint, were well built." But in 1972, General Motors Assembly Division took over the Chevrolet Lordstown assembly plant and the adjoining Fisher Body plant. Their main goal was to cut costs, and more than 800 workers were laid off, many of whom were the additional inspectors. This led to assembly-line vandalism, with workers intentionally slowing the line, leaving off parts and installing others improperly. Incomplete and often non-functioning cars soon filled the factory lot, which then had to be reprocessed and repaired by a team assigned to this task by DeLorean. A one-month strike followed, and dealers did not receive enough cars for the demand in 1972. DeLorean regrouped for the 1973 model year with Vega sales of 395,792. The one-millionth Vega was built in May 1973.

In 1972, DeLorean was appointed to the position of vice president of car and truck production for the entire General Motors line, and his eventual rise to president seemed inevitable. However, the idea of him assuming that position was almost intolerable to GM executives, and on April 2, 1973, he announced that he was leaving the company, telling the press, "I want to do things in the social area. I have to do them, and unfortunately the nature of our business just didn't permit me to do as much as I wanted." However, it had been rumored that he had been fired. GM gave him a Florida Cadillac franchise as a retirement gift, and DeLorean took over the presidency of The National Alliance of Businessmen, a charitable organization with the mission of employing Americans in need, founded by Lyndon Johnson and Henry Ford II.

DeLorean was sharply critical of the direction GM had taken by the start of the 1970s, as well as objecting to the idea of using rebates to sell cars:

"There's no forward response at General Motors to what the public wants today. A car should make people's eyes light up when they step into the showroom. Rebates are merely a way of convincing customers to buy bland cars they're not interested in."

After DeLorean left General Motors, Patrick Wright, author and former Business Week reporter, approached him with the idea of writing a book based on his experiences there. DeLorean agreed to dictate his recollections for Wright, who wrote the book. The final product, published in 1979, On a Clear Day You Can See General Motors, sold approximately 1.6 million copies, but disagreements over the content led to a conflict between the collaborators, with Wright eventually publishing the book on his own.

=== DeLorean Motor Company ===
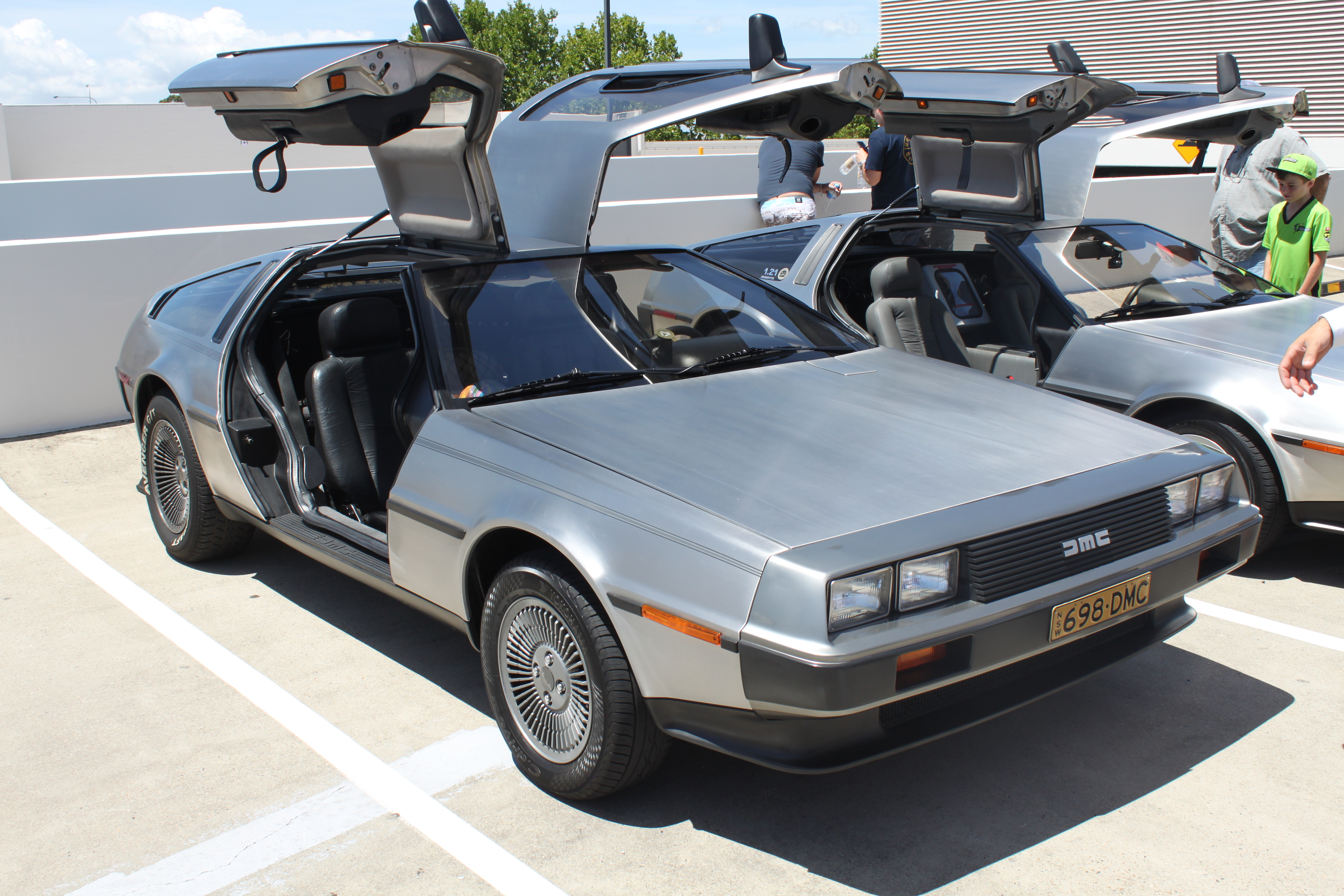
A DMC DeLorean

DeLorean and the prototype of the DMC DeLorean, 1980

DeLorean left General Motors in 1973 to form his own company, the DeLorean Motor Company. He raised $200 million to launch the company, including $4 million of his own funds. A two-seat sports car prototype was shown in the mid-1970s called the DeLorean Safety Vehicle (DSV), with its bodyshell designed by Italdesign's Giorgetto Giugiaro. The car entered into production as the DMC DeLorean. The car's body distinctively has stainless steel and featured gull-wing doors. It is powered by the "Douvrin" V6 engine developed by Peugeot, Renault, and Volvo (known as the PRV).

The manufacturing plant to build the new car was built in Dunmurry, a suburb of Belfast in Northern Ireland, with substantial financial incentives from the Northern Ireland Development Agency of around £100 million. Renault was contracted to build the factory, which employed over 2,000 workers at its peak production. The engine was made by Renault, while Lotus designed the chassis and bodywork details. The Dunmurry factory eventually turned out around 9,000 cars. In 1980, an American Express catalog featured an ad for a DeLorean plated in 24-karat gold. According to the ad, only 100 were going to be manufactured and sold for $85,000. In total, only four were actually purchased.

Production delays meant the DeLorean did not reach the consumer market until January 1981, nearly a decade after the company was founded, and in the interim, the new car market had slumped considerably during the 1980 US economic recession. This was compounded by unexpectedly lukewarm reviews from critics and the public, who generally felt the uniqueness of the DeLorean's styling did not compensate for the higher price and lower horsepower relative to other GT-influenced sports cars on the market.

While interest in the DeLorean quickly dwindled, competing models with lower price tags and more powerful engines, such as the Chevrolet Corvette, sold in record numbers during 1980–81 in spite of the ongoing recession. By February 1982, more than half of the roughly 7,000 DeLoreans produced remained unsold, DMC was $175 million in debt, and the Dunmurry factory was placed in receivership.

In January 1982, the British government discovered that DeLorean had built just 8,500 cars and that the equivalent of £23 million, almost half the funds received in 1974, had been transferred to a Panamanian account under the name of General Product Development Services, the company intended to subsidize Lotus. But the money never made it to Lotus, which had collaborated in the development of the car; Lotus head Colin Chapman died at the start of the investigation into the missing money.

After going into receivership in February 1982, DMC produced another 2,000 cars until John DeLorean's arrest in late October, at which point liquidation proceedings were undertaken, and the factory was seized by the British government.

== Arrest and trial ==
On October 19, 1982, DeLorean was charged by the US government with trafficking cocaine following a videotaped sting operation in which he was recorded by undercover federal agents agreeing to bankroll a cocaine smuggling operation. The FBI set him up with more than 59 lb (27 kg) of cocaine (worth about $6.5 million) in a hotel near Los Angeles International Airport after arriving from New York, with the FBI stating DeLorean was the "financier" to help the financially declining company in a scheme to sell 220 lb (100 kg), with an estimated value of $24 million.

The government was tipped off to DeLorean by confidential informant James Timothy Hoffman, a former neighbor, who reported to his FBI superiors that DeLorean had approached him to ask about setting up a cocaine deal. In truth, Hoffman had called DeLorean and suggested the deal, which DeLorean then accepted, as part of Hoffman's efforts to receive a reduced sentence for a 1981 federal cocaine trafficking charge on which he was awaiting trial. Hoffman, whose name was redacted on the original indictment, also stated that he was aware of DeLorean's financial troubles before he contacted him, and had heard him admit that he needed $17 million "in a hurry" to prevent DMC's imminent insolvency.

Taken together, these two elements allowed DeLorean to successfully defend himself at trial with the procedural defense of police entrapment. DeLorean's lawyers successfully argued that the FBI and DEA had unfairly targeted and illegally entrapped DeLorean when they allowed Hoffman, an active FBI informant who only knew DeLorean casually, to solicit DeLorean into a criminal conspiracy simply because he was known to be financially vulnerable.

Another factor was DeLorean's lack of criminal history, whereas Hoffman was a career criminal who stood to directly benefit if he was able to convince DeLorean to incriminate himself on tape. The DeLorean defense team called one witness, Carol Winkler, DeLorean's secretary. Her call log proved that Hoffman made the initial call. DeLorean was found not guilty on August 16, 1984. By then, DMC had already collapsed into bankruptcy and DeLorean's reputation as a businessman was irrevocably tarnished. When asked after his acquittal if he planned to resume his career in the auto industry, DeLorean bitterly quipped, "Would you buy a used car from me?"

On September 21, 1985, DeLorean was indicted on charges he defrauded investors and committed tax evasion by diverting millions of dollars raised for the company to himself. He was acquitted of all charges.

== Later enterprises ==
On November 1, 1994, DeLorean filed U.S. patent 5,359,941 with the US Patent and Trademark Office for a raised monorail transport. The transport was never built. DeLorean had planned to resurrect his car company and gave interviews describing a new vehicle called the DMC2. According to his family, he spent a lot of time in his last years working on this new venture. In an effort to gather funds, he designed and sold high-end watches via the Internet under the name DeLorean Time.

The DeLorean Motor Company name was purchased by a Texas-based firm that provides parts and professional restoration to DeLorean owners. Although John DeLorean was not involved in the business, its vice president James Espey spoke with him on the phone once a month. According to Espey, in their final conversation, DeLorean expressed his dismay at the direction of General Motors, saying "They have too many bean counters and not enough engineers."

== Personal life ==
DeLorean was married four times. He married Elizabeth Higgins on September 3, 1954. They divorced in 1969. He married Kelly Harmon on May 31, 1969, the sister of actor Mark Harmon and daughter of Heisman Trophy winner Tom Harmon and actress Elyse Knox. They divorced in 1972. DeLorean co-adopted a son aged 14 months old at the time of his marriage to model Cristina Ferrare. They had a daughter born November 15, 1977 and divorced in 1985.

During his marriage to Ferrare, he and his family primarily lived in a 15-room, eighth- and ninth-floor duplex at 834 Fifth Avenue in Manhattan. This apartment was sold to businessman Reginald Lewis in 1992. He later lived with a partner, Sally Baldwin, on his Bedminster, New Jersey, estate. They moved to Morristown, New Jersey, in 2000. In 2002, the two married. They had a daughter on February 19, 2002.

DeLorean appeared in a magazine advertisement for Cutty Sark whisky the year before his arrest and the collapse of his company. It was captioned: "One out of every 100 new businesses succeeds. Here's to those who take the odds." The film Back to the Future was released in 1985, featuring a DMC DeLorean. DeLorean wrote to writer and producer Bob Gale to thank him for immortalizing the car.

In 1999, DeLorean declared personal bankruptcy after fighting some 40 legal cases following the collapse of DeLorean Motor Company. He was forced to sell his 434-acre (176 ha) estate in Bedminster in 2000. Donald Trump bought it and converted it to Trump National Golf Club Bedminster. It was reported that following the entrapment controversy, DeLorean and Ferrare became born-again Christians and that this religious experience was to be covered in his autobiography.

== Death ==
DeLorean died at Overlook Hospital in Summit, New Jersey, from a stroke, on March 19, 2005, at age 80. His ashes are interred at the White Chapel Cemetery, in Troy, Michigan. Only a handful of people were in attendance, plus a US Army Military Funeral Honors Team from a Detroit unit of the Michigan Army National Guard, in recognition of his service during World War II. His tombstone shows a depiction of his DeLorean sports car with the gull-wing doors open.

== Published work ==
- DeLorean, John Z.; Wright, J. Patrick (1979). On a Clear Day You Can See General Motors.

== Portrayals and coverage in media ==
=== Feature films ===
- Driven (2018), Actor Lee Pace portrays John DeLorean in a film about the FBI sting operation to entrap the maverick car designer. The film was premiered at the 75th Venice International Film Festival in 2018 and had a wide release in August 2019.

=== Documentary films ===
- DeLorean (1981), A documentary directed by Academy Award winning filmmakers D. A. Pennebaker and Chris Hegedus. The film chronicles John DeLorean throughout the launch of his DeLorean sports car in 1981.
- DeLorean: Living the Dream (2014), chronicles the history of the DeLorean automobile from the rise and fall of automaker John Z. DeLorean, to the international phenomenon of loyal owners and devoted fans who have kept the dream alive for over three decades.
- Framing John DeLorean (2019), Actor Alec Baldwin portrays John DeLorean. "The extraordinary life and career of controversial automaker John DeLorean – from his meteoric rise at General Motors Co. to his obsessive quest to build the world's best sports car."

=== Television ===
- Monkeys (1989), a BBC Northern Ireland TV movie based on the book The DeLorean Tapes. It was directed by Academy Award winning director Danny Boyle, and stars Manning Redwood as John DeLorean.
- Scandal: The Fast Lane (1989) (John DeLorean / Roy Nesseth documentary), an un-aired British television documentary about the DeLorean Motor Company, John Z. DeLorean, Roy Nesseth
- Car Crash: The DeLorean Story (2004), a BBC television documentary about the rise and fall of the DeLorean Motor Company
- Anything to Win: The Crash of John DeLorean (2006), a TV series produced on Game Show Network
- DeLorean: Back from the Future (2021), a BBC documentary about John DeLorean and his short lived car company
- Myth & Mogul: John DeLorean (2021), a Netflix documentary about the rise and fall of automaker John DeLorean

=== Music ===
- Stainless Style (2007), a concept album about DeLorean by the synthpop group Neon Neon.

== The DeLorean Museum ==
The DeLorean Museum, based in Humble, Texas, was established in 2006 to display, interpret, conserve, and preserve DeLorean vehicles, archives, and other objects.
