= Product 19 =

Breakfast cereal made by Kellogg's

Product 19 logo

Product 19 was a breakfast cereal made by Kellogg's. Introduced in 1967, it consisted of lightly sweetened flakes made of corn, oats, wheat, and rice, marketed as containing all required daily vitamins and iron. The product was discontinued in 2016.

== Origin of name ==
The name has been explained in two ways: as the 19th version of the cereal or Kellogg's 19th product in development that year.

== Product history and marketing ==
Kellogg's introduced Product 19 in 1967 in response to General Mills' Total, which claimed to contain the entire daily nutritional requirement of vitamins and minerals. Like Total, Product 19 was fortified with the US recommended daily allowance of vitamins and minerals. Unlike Total, Product 19 was a multi-grain cereal. It was packed in a relatively plain red and white box, originally with charts and text, and was marketed to older consumers and the health-conscious. The original slogan was "Instant Nutrition - New cereal food created especially for working mothers, otherwise busy mothers and everybody in a hurry."

In the early 1970s, advertising for Product 19 featured former American football player Tom Harmon. Towards the end, boxes depicted a person doing yoga. Within Kellogg's range of cereals, it was targeted to customers seeking to lose weight. In response to lackluster sales, Kellogg's limited distribution of Product 19 in the 2010s, and announced in 2016 that it had been discontinued.
