= Tito Guízar =

American actor

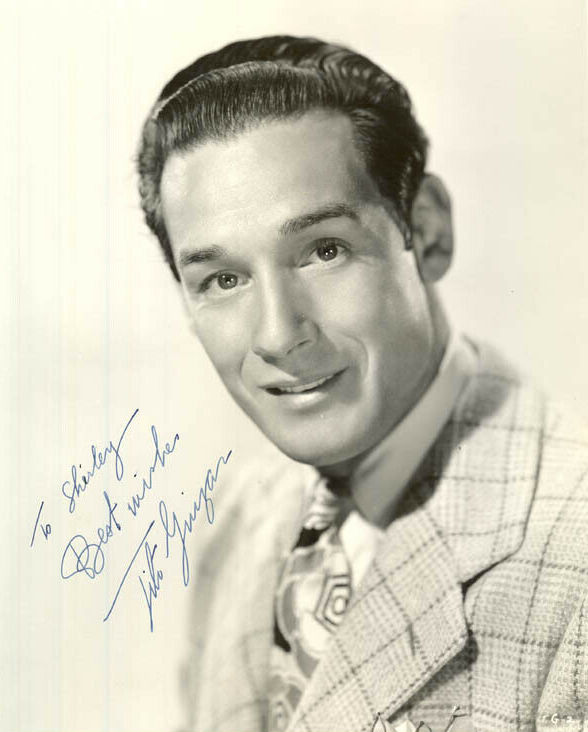
- Guízar in 1944
- Born: Federico Arturo Guízar Tolentino; 8 April 1908; Guadalajara, Jalisco, Mexico
- Died: 24 December 1999 (aged 91); San Antonio, Texas, United States
- Resting place: Panteón Jardín, Mexico City, Mexico
- Occupations: Singer; Actor
- Years active: 1923–1999
- Notable work: Allá en el Rancho Grande
- Spouse: Carmen Noriega (m. 1931; died 1990)
- Children: 3, including Lilia Guízar

Federico Arturo Guízar Tolentino (Spanish pronunciation: [ˈtito ˈɣisaɾ]; 8 April 1908 – 24 December 1999), known professionally as Tito Guízar, was a Mexican singer and actor. Along with Dolores del Río, Ramón Novarro and Lupe Vélez, as well as José Mojica, Guízar was among the few Mexicans who made history in the early years of Hollywood.

== Career ==
In a career that spanned over seven decades, Guízar trained early as an opera singer and traveled to New York City in 1929 to record the songs of Agustín Lara.

In addition, Guízar performed both operatic and Mexican popular songs at Carnegie Hall, but he succeeded with his arrangements of popular Mexican and Spanish melodies such as Cielito Lindo, La Cucaracha (The Cockroach), Granada, and You Belong to My Heart (English version of Solamente una Vez). In 1936, his song "Allá en el Rancho Grande" ("There on the Big Ranch") launched the singing charro in Mexico after appearing in the film of the same name, succeeding as well in the United States.

Guízar made numerous television appearances, toured in most of Latin American countries, recorded a significant number of songs, and had his own radio show in Los Angeles, Tito Guízar y su Guitarra (Tito Guízar and his Guitar).

== Films ==
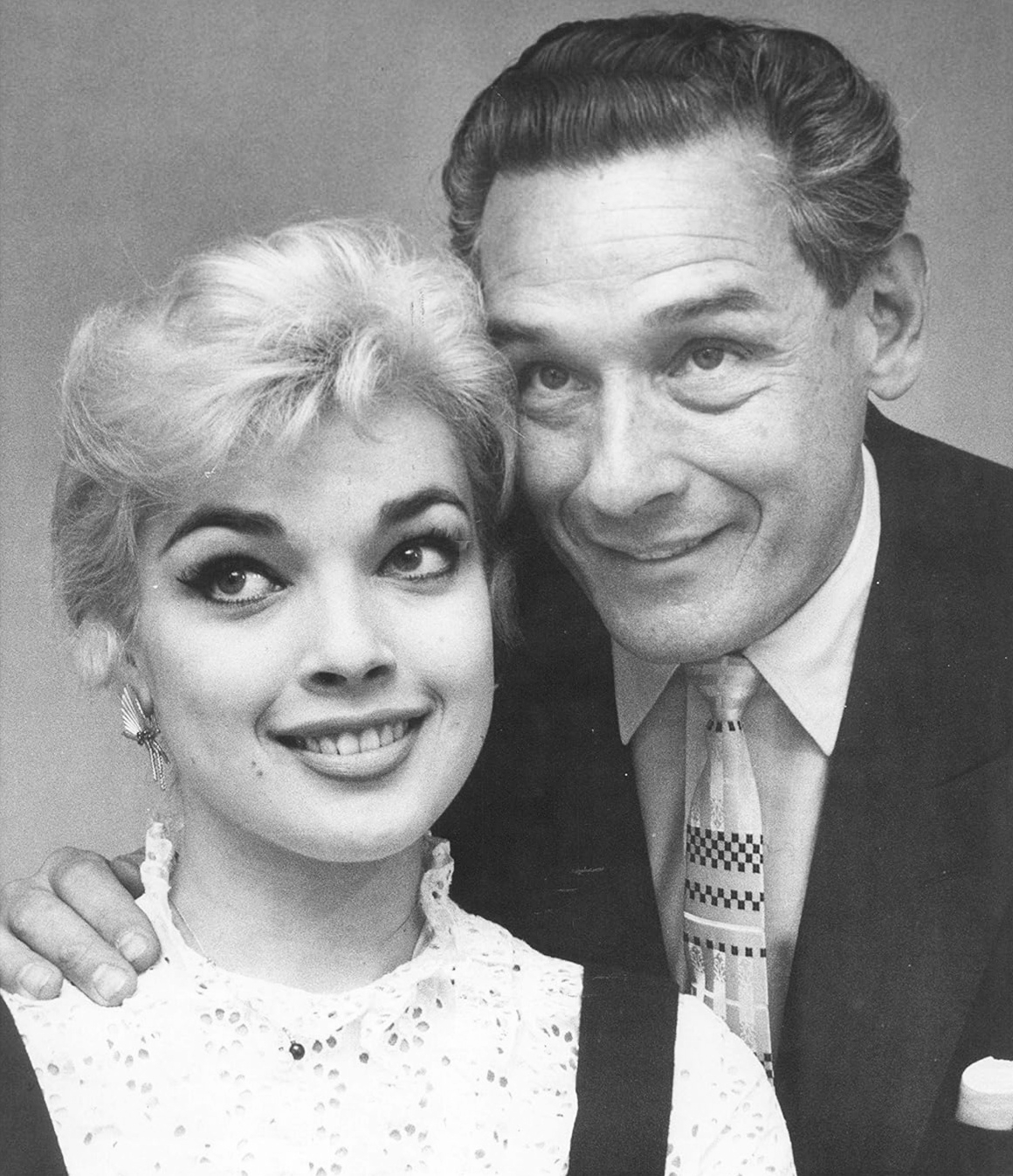
Tito with his daughter Lilia Guízar in 1959

He also appeared in dozens of films, including The Big Broadcast of 1938 (1938), Tropic Holiday (1938), St. Louis Blues (1939), The Llano Kid (1939), Brazil (1944), and The Gay Ranchero (1948), playing with such stars as Evelyn Keyes, Dorothy Lamour, Ray Milland, Ann Miller, Martha Raye, Roy Rogers, Mae West and Keenan Wynn. In the 1990s, he continued starring in series in Mexican television.

== Death ==
Guizar died of respiratory failure (of natural causes) on December 24, 1999, in San Antonio, Texas. He was survived by his three children, Nina, Lillya, and Tito Jr.

== Partial filmography ==
- Under the Pampas Moon (1935) - Café Singer
- Allá en el Rancho Grande (There on the Big Ranch) (1936) - José Francisco Ruelas
- Poppy of the Road (1937) - Antonio Rosales
- The Big Broadcast of 1938 (1938) - Specialty
- Tropic Holiday (1938) - Ramón
- Mis Dos Amores (My Two Loves) (1938) - Julio Bertolin
- El trovador de la radio (1938) - Mario del Valle
- St. Louis Blues (1939) - Rafael San Ramos
- Bachelor Father (1939) - Carlos del Rio
- The Llano Kid (1939) - Enrique Ibarra aka The Llano Kid
- El rancho del pinar (1939) - Alberto Galindo
- Allá en el Trópico (Back in the Tropics) (1940) - José Juan García
- De México llegó el amor (1940) - Tito
- Blondie Goes Latin (1941) - Manuel Rodríguez
- Beautiful Michoacán (1943) - Ernesto
- Amores de ayer (1944) - Tito
- Brazil (1944) - Miguel Soares
- Adiós, Mariquita linda (1944)
- Marina (1945) - Jorge
- 'Como México no hay dos'! (1945)
- Mexicana (1945) - 'Pepe' Villarreal
- The Thrill of Brazil (1946) - Himself
- On the Old Spanish Trail (1947) - Rico - aka The Gypsy
- The Gay Ranchero (1948) - Nicci Lopez
- El Gallero (1948) - Gabriel
- En los Altos de Jalisco (In the Highlands of Jalisco) (1948) - Juan Chávez
- Ahí viene Vidal Tenorio (1949)
- De Tequila, su mezcal (1950) - Tito
- Sindicato de telemirones (1954) - Luis Manrique
- De ranchero a empresario (1954) - Tito
- El plagiario (1955)
- The Sin of Being a Woman (1955) - Javier Morales
- Los hijos de Rancho Grande (1956) - José Francisco
- Locura musical (1958) - Himself
- Music and Money (1958)
- Música en la noche (1958)
- The Time and the Touch (1962) - Max
- Allá en el rancho de las flores (1983)
- Reclusorio (1997) - Tito Iriarte (segment "Eutanasia o asesinato")
- Marimar (1994) - Papa Panco
- Maria la del Barrio (1995) - Father Honorio
- La Usurpadora (1998) - Don Panchito
