= Cavalcade of Dance =

1943 film

- Directed by: Jean Negulesco
- Written by: James Bloodworth
- Produced by: Gordon Hollingshead
- Starring: Veloz and Yolanda
- Narrated by: Art Gilmore
- Cinematography: Ernest Haller
- Edited by: Rex Steele
- Distributed by: Warner Bros. Pictures
- Release date: October 3, 1943
- Running time: 11 minutes
- Country: United States
- Language: English

Cavalcade of Dance is a 1943 American short film released by Warner Bros. Pictures and directed by Jean Negulesco. It was nominated for an Academy Award at the 16th Academy Awards for Best Short Subject (One-Reel).

== Plot ==
Dancers Veloz and Yolanda demonstrate different styles of ballroom dance.

== Cast ==
- Veloz and Yolanda
