= The Thrill of Brazil =

1946 film by S. Sylvan Simon

- Directed by: S. Sylvan Simon
- Written by: Harry Clork; Devery Freeman; Allen Rivkin
- Produced by: Sidney Biddell; Allen Rivkin
- Starring: Evelyn Keyes; Keenan Wynn; Ann Miller
- Cinematography: Charles Lawton Jr.
- Edited by: Charles Nelson
- Music by: Leo Arnaud
- Production company: Columbia Pictures
- Distributed by: Columbia Pictures
- Release date: September 6, 1946
- Running time: 91 minutes
- Country: United States
- Language: English

The Thrill of Brazil is a 1946 American musical comedy film directed by S. Sylvan Simon and starring Evelyn Keyes, Keenan Wynn, and Ann Miller. It was produced and distributed by Columbia Pictures. Simon was loaned out from MGM to direct the film.

== Plot ==
Vicki Dean is the soon to be divorced wife of theatrical manager Steve Farraugh. While mounting a big musical spectacular in Brazil, Farraugh simultaneously campaigns to win back his wife. The couple encounters romantic interference from tap-dancer Linda Lorens.

== Cast ==
- Evelyn Keyes as Vicki Dean
- Keenan Wynn as Steve Farraugh
- Ann Miller as Linda Lorens
- Allyn Joslyn as John Habour
- Tito Guízar as himself
- Veloz and Yolanda as themselves
- Felix Bressart as Ludwig Kriegspiel
- Sid Tomack as Irikie Bowers
- Enric Madriguera and Orchestra as Themselves
- Eugene Borden as Luiz
- Eddie Parks as Sonny Kirkabee
- Martin Garralaga as Alberto, the Waiter
- Nina Bara as Dancer
- Suzanne Ridgway as Nightclub patron
- Frank Yaconelli as Photographer
- Mary Meade as Showgirl
- Helen Chapman as Showgirl
- Peggy Maley as Showgirl

== Bibliography ==
- Tucker, David C. S. Sylvan Simon, Moviemaker: Adventures with Lucy, Red Skelton and Harry Cohn in the Golden Age of Hollywood. McFarland, 2021.
