= Veloz and Yolanda =

American ballroom husband and wife dance team

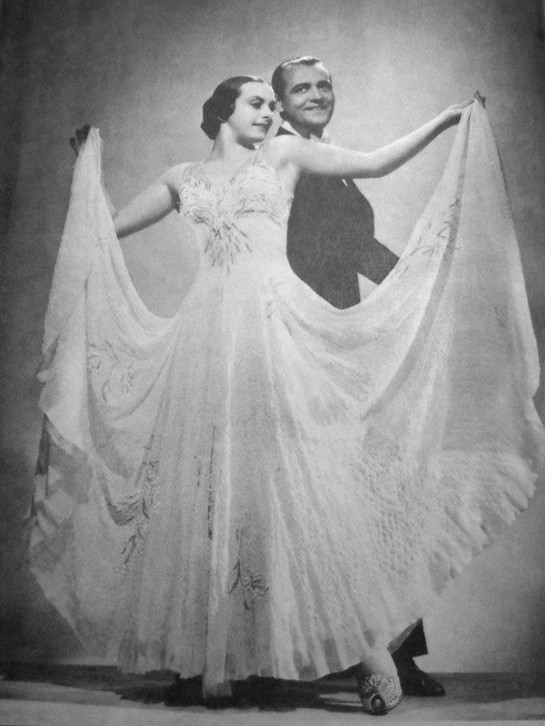
Veloz and Yolanda in Dansation of 1941

Frank Veloz (1906–1981) and Yolanda Casazza (1908–1995) were a self-taught American ballroom dance team, husband and wife, who became stars in the 1930s and 1940s, and were among the highest paid dance acts during that era. They performed on stage in productions such as Hot-Cha!, which ran for 119 shows on Broadway in 1932. They also appeared in popular films such as Under the Pampas Moon (1935), The Pride of the Yankees (1942), Honeymoon Lodge (1943), Brazil (1944) and The Thrill of Brazil (1946), the latter of which is credited as being of major importance to the growth in popularity of Samba in America.

Veloz and Yolanda specialized in Latin ballroom dance styles, and opened their own chain of dance studios, where many middle-class people learned the art of ballroom dancing. The studios closed down in the mid-1950s as new forms of dance became popular. Veloz and Yolanda did much to legitimate ballroom dance as a performance art and invented the "Cobra Tango", a dance which interpreted a fight between a snake and a tiger. A full-length ballet written by their son Guy Veloz, An American Tango, is based on their life story.

== Early years ==
Frank Veloz was born in Washington, D.C. in 1906 to a Spanish father and a Dutch mother. Yolanda Bianca was born in 1908. (Note: Life magazine states that Frank Veloz was born of Venezuelan parents, not Spanish and Dutch, and gives Yolanda's family name as Casazza rather than Bianca. It states that Frank was 21 and Yolanda was 17 when they met. This is inconsistent with the birth dates of 1902 and 1911 given by other sources, which actually were respectively 1906 and 1908.) One of six sisters, Yolanda was from an Italian family. They met at a high school sorority dance in the Collegiate Club on 84th street, Manhattan; Yolanda was sixteen and a student at Washington Irving High School while Veloz was an office boy. They danced in public dance contests, at first without success, but then won forty competitions, with prizes of US$5 or US$10 ($72 and $144 in 2018). In 1927, they won the New York City and State Championship. After this they lost their amateur status and could no longer enter the competitions.

At first, Veloz and Yolanda struggled as a professional team. Many of their engagements turned into disasters. Veloz and Yolanda featured in the 1927 Broadway show Artists and Models, starring Ted Lewis and Jack Pearl. In 1929 they were in Pleasure Bound, another revue, with Aileen Stanley, Jack Pearl and Phil Baker. The New York Times critic Brooks Atkinson described Pleasure Bound as a "rough-and-ready" revue, but called the act of Frank Veloz and Yolanda Casazza a has-to-be-seen "centrifugal dance spinning feminine heels in the air". The couple married in 1929 and soon began arguing over each other's mistakes, even considering divorce.

== Star performers ==
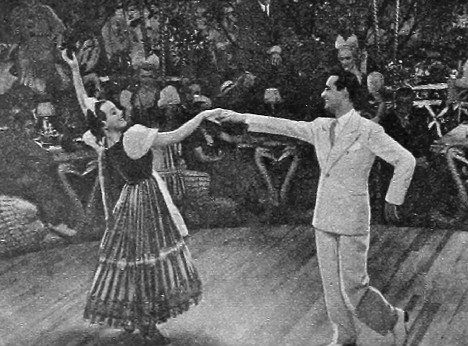
Veloz and Yolanda in the film Champagne Waltz (1937)

In the 1930s, Veloz and Yolanda performed at first in small night clubs in New York, and later at expensive supper clubs. They appeared as specialty dancers in the Broadway musical comedy Hot-Cha! which ran for 119 performances at the Ziegfeld Theatre between 8 March and 18 June 1932. They got their break when they were performing at the Everglades in Manhattan and were spotted by the Shubert brothers. This led to a highly successful career on the stage, in films and in supper clubs. Veloz and Yolanda choreographed the dance sequences in the film Rumba (Paramount, 1935) starring George Raft, and in some sequences Veloz doubled for Raft. The film Under the Pampas Moon (Fox, 1935) starring Warner Baxter featured tango. Rita Cansino, later to achieve fame as Rita Hayworth, performed an exuberant blend of flamenco and tango. The high point of the movie was a performance of a "cobra-tango" by Veloz and Yolanda.

As the leading ballroom dance team in the United States, Veloz and Yolanda made US$8,500 (over US$150,000 in 2018) in one week in Chicago in 1939. They appeared on the cover of Life magazine on 30 October 1939, which called them, "The greatest dance couple in America." They were the first to give a recital of ballroom dance at Carnegie Hall They appeared at the Chicago Palmer House and then at the Cocoanut Grove in Hollywood. Veloz and Yolanda moved to Southern California in the 1940s.

The Cocoanut Grove performances led to movie contracts, including Honeymoon Lodge, Cavalcade of Dance, The Pride of the Yankees, and The Thrill of Brazil. Samuel Goldwyn had insisted on having a nightclub sequence with Veloz and Yolanda in The Pride of the Yankees to give some interest for women in what was otherwise a baseball movie. They performed in Dancing with the Stars at the Hollywood Bowl in 1942, 1944 and 1946.

== Other activities ==
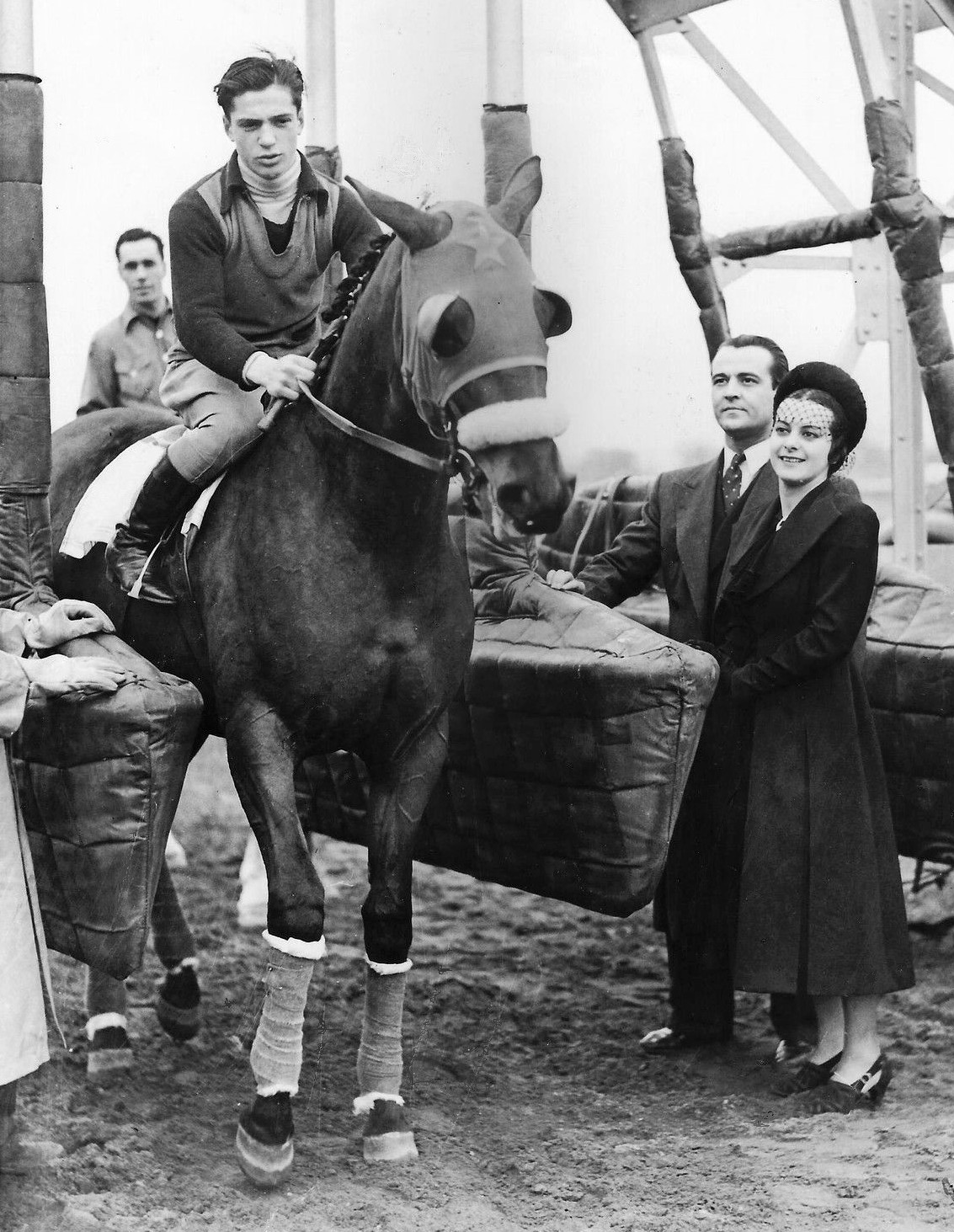
Veloz and Yolanda with their race horse Veolanda in 1938

Both Frank and Yolanda were Christian Scientists. Yolanda always carried a knitted bag with her holding the Bible and Science and Health. She attended the same Christian Science church as Ginger Rogers for many years. Off stage, she was quiet, modest and wore plain clothes, saying "pretty" clothes were for her performances. Her stage dresses, all designed by Frank, were exquisite. Their first child, Frank Jr., was born in 1940. They had four children in all, called the "million dollar babies" due to the amount of income the couple lost while Yolanda was pregnant and then nursing a newborn. Two of these children died in their twenties.

In 1938, Veloz and Yolanda published a dance manual, Tango and Rumba: The Dances of Today and Tomorrow (New York: Harper & Brothers), co-written with Willard Hall. They hosted a TV show, The Veloz and Yolanda Hour, for several years. They opened a nightclub in Florida, The Iris. From the 1940s, the Veloz and Yolanda Dance Studios gave lessons in ballroom dancing for twelve hours each day, with the slogan "Walk In – Dance Out". The studios taught the Rhumba, Waltz, Fox Trot, Smooth Swing, Tango, Samba and Mambo. With each style, the student had to learn a series of steps or combinations. They would progress through the grades of "ruby" and "emerald" to the ultimate "diamond" level.

In 1949, when Yolanda was pregnant, Frank Veloz danced with Jean Davi (born Jean Phelps) on the first Academy of Television Arts & Sciences awards. (Note: Jeannette Phelps, who moved to Los Angeles with her family in 1942, married and later divorced Bebe Davi. She performed under the name of Jean Davi. She partnered with Frank Veloz in the Ballroom World and on his TV show "The Frank Veloz Show" from 1950-1955. She performed in November 1952 with Frank Veloz on the TV Red Feather Variety Show hosted by Art Linkletter. She was billed as "Jean Davi" in shows in 1949, 1952 and 1954. Jean married Frank in 1963. Twenty years younger than Veloz, Davi stayed with him until his death. In the 1990s, Jean Veloz came back into the limelight when there was a revival of swing dancing.) Jean was a Hollywood Lindy dancer who trained in ballroom dancing at one of the Veloz and Yolanda dance schools. After Yolanda retired, Jean became Frank's partner in stage and TV performances.

When the fashion for ballroom dancing declined, replaced by new forms of dance, the Veloz and Yolanda schools began to close. The marriage broke up in the mid-1950s. In 1956, Yolanda sued Veloz for maintenance, accusing him of infidelity with Jean Davi, his dancing partner. (Note: Newspaper reports of the 1962 divorce proceedings incorrectly give Jean Davi's name as "Jean David".) The suit was dismissed the next year. In 1962, Veloz sued for divorce on the basis of extreme cruelty by his wife. Yolanda was to have custody of their minor children. Their children were Nicholas, 21; Anthony, 18; Yolanda, 16 and Guy, 12.

Frank Veloz died in 1981. Yolanda Casazza died in 1995. A full-length ballet written by their son Guy Veloz, An American Tango, is based on their life story.

== Style and influence ==
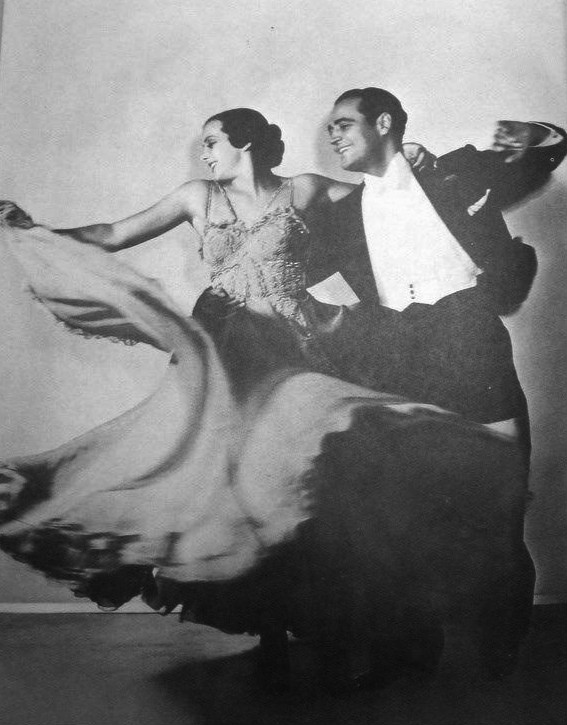
Veloz and Yolanda in Dansation of 1941

Veloz and Yolanda did much to legitimize ballroom dance as a performance art. Veloz and Yolanda were interested in the way animals moved about and were said to have studied horses to learn change of stride and tempo. They created the "Cobra Tango", a dance that interpreted a fight between a snake and a tiger. Veloz and Yolanda were known in particular for their interpretations of Latin Dance. With the Columbia film The Thrill of Brazil they made the Samba popular in America. Their signature dance was the "Yolanda Tango", written by Frank, with which they ended their dance performances. William Teaford and Elizabeth Talbot-Martin said this dance epitomized their style and performance. They wrote, "There was one lift that was truly spectacular – Frank would pick up Yolanda, spin her with her head down, then throw her out where she landed on one knee in a low lunge, back leg extended. They never did any thing acrobatic, but this lift was spectacular."

For Your Pleasure, a "dance vaudeville" featuring Veloz and Yolanda, opened at New York's Mansfield Theater on 5 February 1943 and ran for eleven performances. They performed five dances, with Yolanda in a different gown for each. After seeing the show George Jean Nathan said, "... it is my notion that this Veloz and Yolanda team is merely of the current average skill, not nearly so good as the De Marcos, that is, if it is Renée and not the present Sally who serves as Tony's partner, yet somewhat better than some of the couples publicized in the floor shows." However The Billboard said of the show:

Smoothness is their trademark, and inventiveness of routines, excellent musical arrangements and impeccable grooming are the other attributes that make them outstanding. Avoiding aerial lifts, they depend for effectiveness on an effortless grace, the suggestion of the perfectly mated pair, and an apparent thoro [sic] enjoyment of their work.

== Films ==
Veloz and Yolanda performed as dancers in:

- 1934 Many Happy Returns Specialty Dancers
- 1935 Under the Pampas Moon Café Dancers - The Cobra Tango (as Veloz and Yolanda)
- 1937 Champagne Waltz (as Veloz & Yolanda)
- 1939 Rose of Washington Square (Fox) Specialty Dancers in interlude during Alice Faye's singing of title number
- 1942 The Pride of the Yankees (Goldwyn) Specialty Dancers
- 1943 Cavalcade of Dance (Warner Bros. Short)
- 1943 Honeymoon Lodge (Universal) Dancers
- 1944 Brazil Veloz and Yolanda
- 1946 The Thrill of Brazil (Columbia)
