= Under the Pampas Moon =

1935 film

- Directed by: James Tinling
- Written by: Ernest Pascal
- Story by: Gordon Morris
- Produced by: Buddy G. DeSylva
- Cinematography: Chester A. Lyons
- Production company: Fox Film Corporation
- Distributed by: Fox Film Corporation
- Release date: June 1, 1935
- Running time: 78 minutes
- Country: United States

Under the Pampas Moon, also known as The Gaucho, is a 1935 American Western film directed by James Tinling and starring Warner Baxter and Ketti Gallian. Baxter plays an Argentine gaucho. Rita Hayworth also had an early role in the film. The film has been cited as a "ludicrously dated essay into South American caricature".

== Plot ==
The womanizing gaucho Cesar Campo lives a carefree life on the Pampas. However, when a plane lands nearby he meets an attractive French singer and her unscrupulous fiancée who is so impressed by Cesar's horse that he arranges to have it stolen to enter in a horse race under a false name. Cesar pursues them to Buenos Aires and after a flirtation with the French singer and a series of culture clashes in sophisticated hotels and restaurants he rescues the horse and returns home.

== Cast ==
- Warner Baxter as Cesar Campo
- Ketti Gallian as Yvonne LaMarr
- J. Carrol Naish as Tito
- John Miljan as Graham Scott
- Armida as Rosa
- Ann Codee as Madame LaMarr
- Jack La Rue as Bazan
- George Irving as Don Bennett
- Blanca Vischer as Elena
- Veloz as Café Dancer – The Cobra Tango
- Yolanda as Café Dancer – The Cobra Tango
- Rita Hayworth as Carmen (credited as Rita Cansino)
- Tito Guízar as Café Singer
- Chris-Pin Martin as Pietro
- Max Wagner as Big José
- Philip Cooper as Little José
- Sam Appel as Bartender
- Arthur Stone as Rosa's Father
- George J. Lewis as Aviator
- Paul Porcasi as Headwaiter
- Marie Burton as Maid (credited as Catherine Cotter)
- Soledad Jiménez as Soledad Jiménez

== Merger of 1935 ==
Fox Film Corporation was run by Sidney Kent from 1930 to 1935. The company was in near bankruptcy in early 1935. It was not making enough money on its films but Sol Lesser Productions made a contract to make films with Fox Film. While on Twentieth Century Pictures' side, it was making way more gross on the box office than Fox studios. On May 31, 1935, following the making of Fox Film's Under the Pampas Moon, Kent announced that the two companies intended merging. Eventually, the same day, they merged to form their biggest success, 20th Century-Fox Film Corporation.

== See also ==
- List of films about horses
