= The Great American Pastime =

1956 film by Herman Hoffman

- Directed by: Herman Hoffman
- Written by: Nathaniel Benchley
- Produced by: Henry Berman
- Starring: Tom Ewell; Anne Francis; Ann Miller
- Cinematography: Arthur E. Arling
- Edited by: Gene Ruggiero
- Music by: Jeff Alexander
- Production company: Metro-Goldwyn-Mayer
- Distributed by: Loew's Inc.
- Release date: November 28, 1956
- Running time: 90 minutes
- Country: United States
- Language: English
- Budget: $619,000
- Box office: $520,000

The Great American Pastime is a 1956 American comedy film about Little League baseball, directed by Herman Hoffman and starring Tom Ewell, Anne Francis, and Ann Miller, in her final film for Metro-Goldwyn-Mayer.

== Plot ==
In a small New York town called Willow Falls, a new manager is needed for the Panthers, a local Little League baseball team. Bruce Hallerton, a lawyer by trade, volunteers for the job, deciding it would be a way to spend more time with his son, Dennis.

When it turns out Dennis is instead assigned to play for another team, the Tigers, wife Betty assumes that Bruce will quit the coaching job, but he feels a commitment has been made and needs to be kept. Bruce sets about advising his Panther players that trying is more important than winning, but many parents disagree, and Tigers coach Ed Ryder in particular will do anything necessary to win a game.

One parent, widow Doris Patterson, appears to flirt with Bruce in coaxing him to let her son Herbie be his team's pitcher. Another, the wealthy banker George Carruthers, invites the Hallertons over for dinner, only to pitch his own son Foster to the coach.

Particularly inept at first, the Panthers are mocked by everyone, even Bruce's own son. Betty, too, criticizes her husband's inability to make the team improve on the field. She also becomes so jealous at Doris's perceived romantic interest in Bruce that she studies baseball from a manual so she can become the team's official scorekeeper and keep an eye on him at the same time.

Bruce tells the widow he is happily married and discourages her personal interest in him, offending Doris, who had no such interest at all. After a brawl breaks out between the Panthers and Tigers and continued criticism of his methods, Bruce goes to a bar with a buddy, O'Keefe, and gets tipsy. He comes home to find the door bolted by his wife. At the next game, Bruce decides to use O'Keefe's surprisingly fast son, nicknamed "Man Mountain", and he becomes a hero in a Panther victory.

No one congratulates Bruce, so he goes home vowing never to volunteer again, but when all the parents and kids show up later to thank him, Bruce volunteers to become a scoutmaster for the boys.

== Cast ==
- Tom Ewell as Bruce Hallerton
- Anne Francis as Betty
- Ann Miller as Doris Patterson
- Dean Jones as Buck Rivers
- Rudy Lee as Dennis Hallerton
- Judson Pratt as Ed Ryder
- Raymond Bailey as Carruthers
- Wilfrid Knapp as Mr. Dawson
- Bob Jellison as Mr. O'Keefe
- Todd Ferrell as Man Mountain O'Keefe

== Reception ==
According to MGM records the movie earned $390,000 in the US and Canada and $130,000 elsewhere, making a loss to the studio of $332,000.

== See also ==
- List of American films of 1956
- List of baseball films
