= Brazil (1944 film) =

1944 film by Joseph Santley

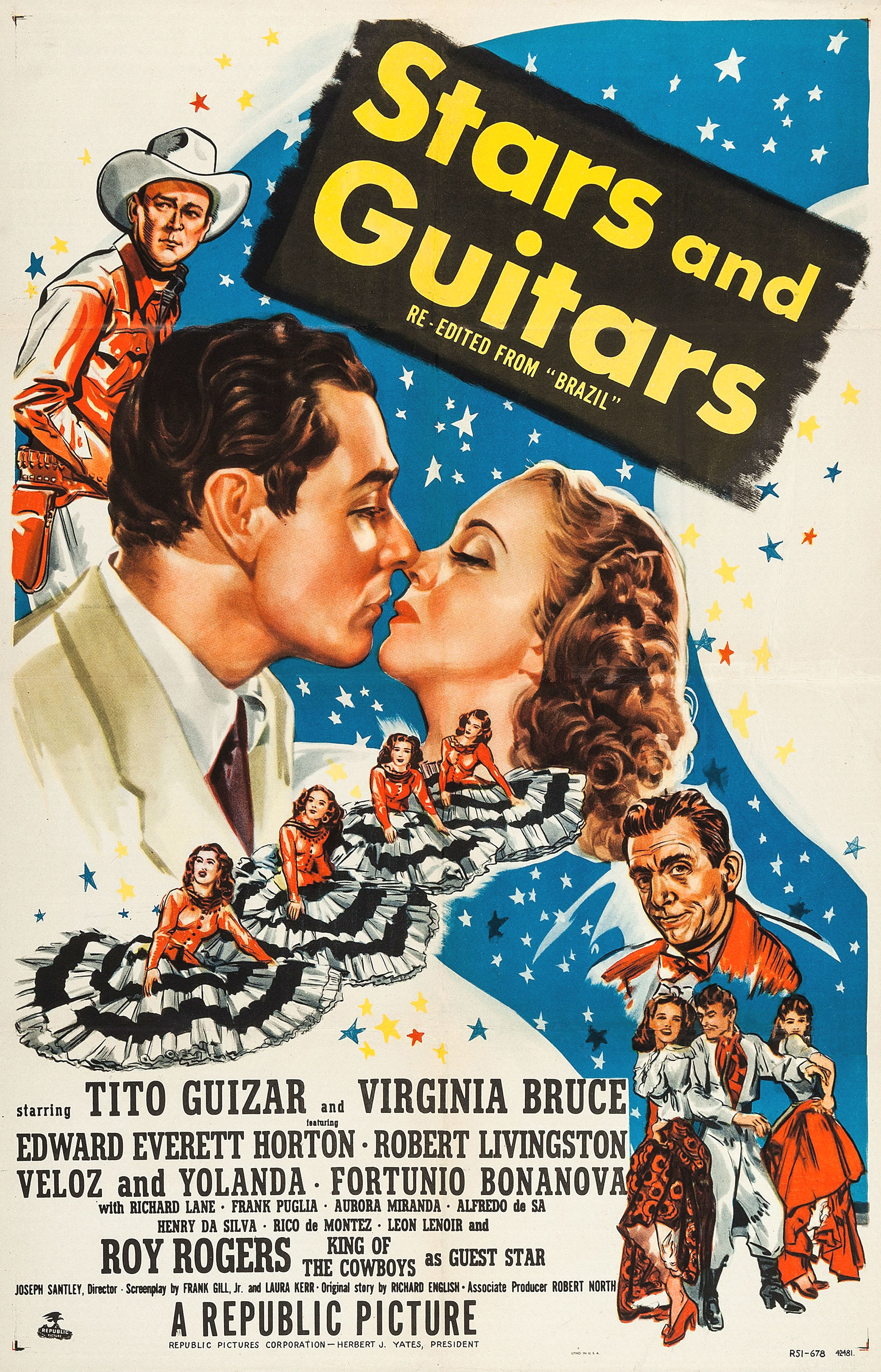
- A poster bearing the film's alternate title: Stars and Guitars
- Directed by: Joseph Santley
- Written by: Richard English; Frank Gill Jr. Laura Kerr
- Produced by: Robert North
- Starring: Tito Guízar; Virginia Bruce; Robert Livingston; Henry Da Silva; Edward Everett Horton; Veloz & Yolanda
- Cinematography: Jack A. Marta
- Edited by: Murray Seldeen, Harry Gerstad (not credited)
- Music by: Walter Scharf
- Production company: Republic Pictures
- Distributed by: Republic Pictures
- Release date: November 30, 1944 (United States)
- Running time: 91 minutes
- Country: United States
- Language: English

Brazil (also known as Stars and Guitars) is a 1944 American musical comedy film directed by Joseph Santley and starring Tito Guízar, Virginia Bruce and Edward Everett Horton.

The film also includes performances by Brazilian singer Aurora Miranda and a cameo appearance by American singing cowboy Roy Rogers.

== Plot ==
In Brazil, a composer masquerades as twins, trying to win the hand of an anti-Latin novelist.

== Cast ==
- Tito Guízar as Miguel Soares
- Virginia Bruce as Nicky Henderson
- Edward Everett Horton as Everett St. John Everett
- Robert Livingston as Rod Walker
- Veloz and Yolanda as themselves
- Fortunio Bonanova as Senhor Renaldo Da Silva
- Richard Lane as Edward Graham
- Frank Puglia as Senhor Machado
- Aurora Miranda as Bailarina, Specialty Dancer
- Alfredo DeSa as Master of Ceremonies (as Alfred de Sa)
- Henry De Silva as Comerciante
- Rico De Montez as Airport Official
- Leonardo Scavino as Reporter (as Leon Lenoir)
- Roy Rogers as himself, Roy Rogers
- Trigger as Trigger, Roy's Horse
- Billy Daniel as Dancer (as Billy Daniels)

== Awards ==
The film was nominated for three Academy Awards:

- Music (Scoring of a Musical Picture)
- Best Original Song: Ary Barroso for Rio de Janeiro
- Sound Recording (Daniel J. Bloomberg)

== See also ==
- List of American films of 1944
