= Ann Miller =

American actress and dancer (1923–2004)

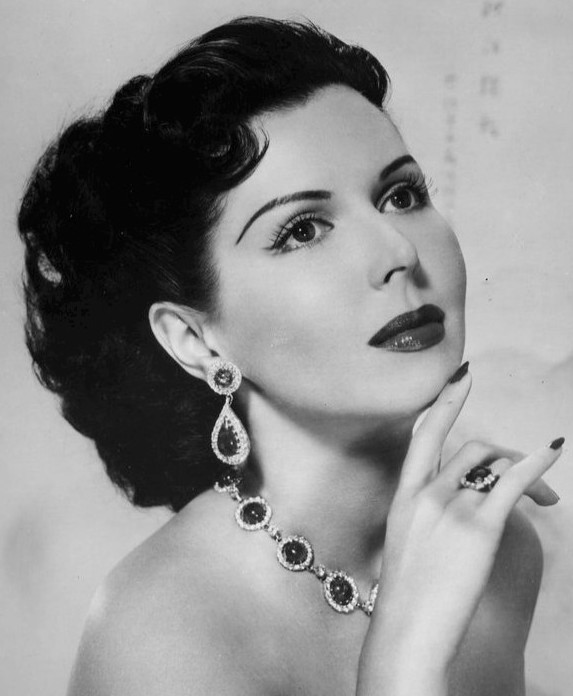
- Miller in 1957
- Born: Johnnie Lucille Collier; April 12, 1923; Chireno, Texas, U.S.
- Died: January 22, 2004 (aged 80); Los Angeles, California, U.S.
- Resting place: Holy Cross Cemetery
- Occupations: Actress; dancer; singer
- Years active: 1934–2001
- Spouses: Reese Llewellyn Milner (m. 1946; div. 1947) Bill Moss (m. 1958; div. 1961) Arthur Cameron (m. 1961; div. 1962)
- Children: 1
- Awards: Hollywood Walk of Fame

Ann Miller (born Johnnie Lucille Collier; April 12, 1923 – January 22, 2004) was an American actress and dancer. She was widely known for her work in the classical Hollywood cinema musicals of the 1940s and 1950s, including her roles in Room Service with the Marx Brothers and Frank Capra's You Can't Take It with You, both released in 1938. She later starred in the musical classics Easter Parade (1948), On the Town (1949), and Kiss Me Kate (1953). Her final film role was in Mulholland Drive (2001).

Miller received a star on the Hollywood Walk of Fame in 1960. The Daily Telegraph named her among the greatest actors to never receive an Academy Award nomination.

== Early life ==
Johnnie Lucille Collier (some sources provide other names, such as Lucille Collier and Lucy Ann Collier) was born on April 12, 1923, in Chireno, Texas. She was the only child of mother Clara Emma (née Birdwell) and father John Alfred Collier, a criminal lawyer who represented the Barrow gang, Machine Gun Kelly, and Baby Face Nelson. Her maternal grandmother was of Cherokee descent.

Miller was put in dance classes at the age of five in an attempt to strengthen her legs after suffering from rickets. She came to be considered a child dance prodigy. In a documentary on the making of the compilation film That's Entertainment! Part III (1994), she said that Eleanor Powell was an early inspiration.

When Miller was nine, her parents divorced, reportedly due to her father's infidelities. Miller later noted that her father "wasn't a very good dad." After the divorce, her mother and she moved to Los Angeles, but her mother struggled to find work due to deafness. Because Miller appeared much older than her true age, she began to work as a dancer in nightclubs and supported her mother. She adopted the stage name Ann Miller, which she kept throughout her career.

== Career ==
=== 1936–1956: Film actress ===
==== RKO ====
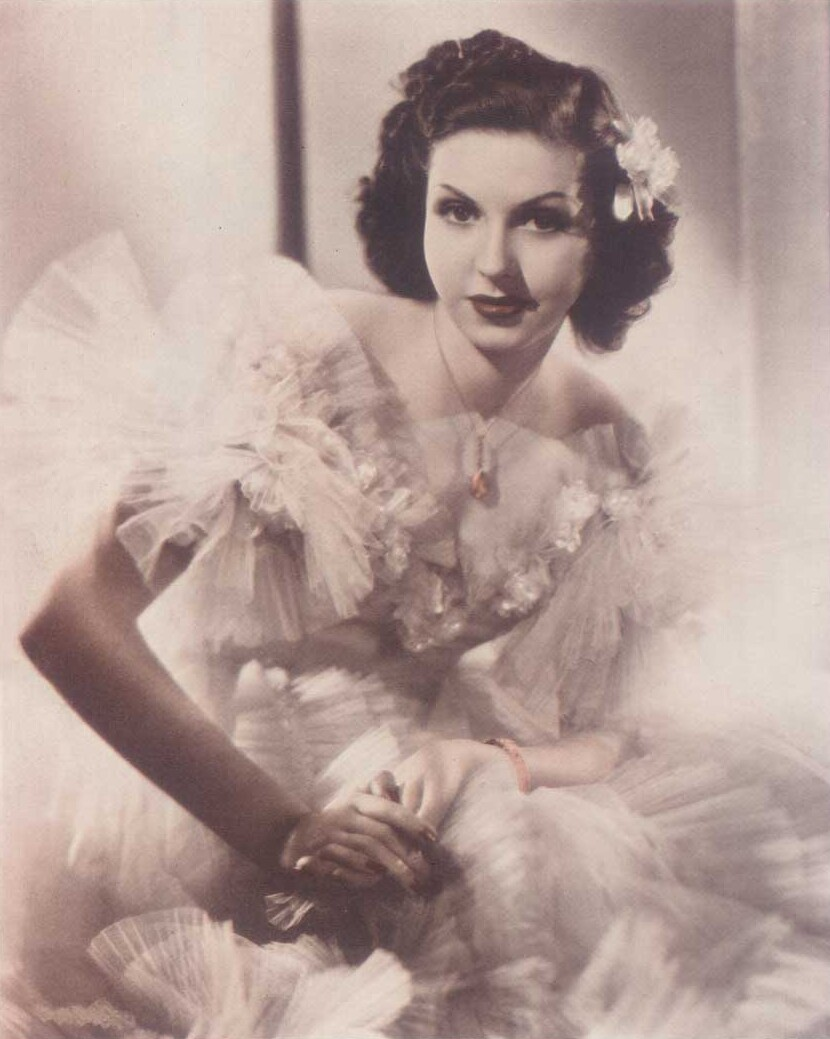
Studio publicity portrait of Miller for RKO Pictures

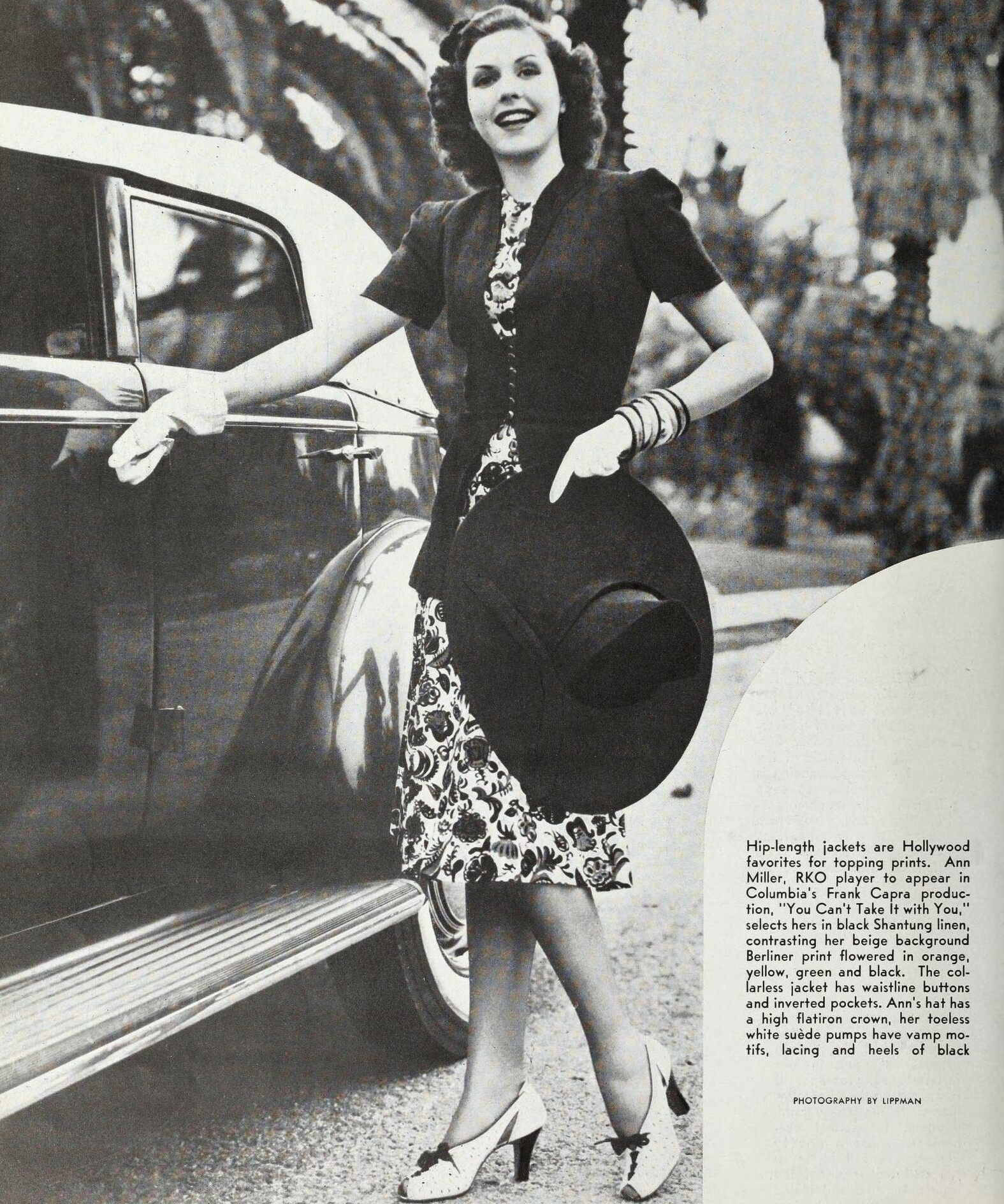
Miller in 1938, by Irving Lippman

In 1936, at age 13, Miller was hired as a showgirl at the Bal Tabarin. Due to employment laws regarding establishments that sold liquor, Miller lied and gave her age as 18. Miller appeared in small roles in films such as Anne of Green Gables (1934), The Good Fairy (1935), and The Devil on Horseback (1936).

While working at Bal Tabarin, Miller was discovered by Lucille Ball and talent scout/comic Benny Rubin. This led to a contract with RKO Pictures, which also believed that Miller was 18. When RKO discovered her true age later, Miller's father provided a fake birth certificate with the name Lucy Ann Collier.

Miller had small appearances for RKO in New Faces of 1937 (1937) and The Life of the Party (1937). Her first major role came as Ginger Rogers’ dancing partner in Gregory La Cava’s Stage Door in 1937.

In 1938 and 1939, Miller was a supporting actress in many of the studio's films, such as Radio City Revels, Having Wonderful Time, Room Service, Tarnished Angel, and most notably as the quirky Essie Carmichael in Frank Capra's You Can't Take It With You (made at Columbia). Her last film at RKO was Too Many Girls (1940).

In 1939, Miller made her Broadway debut in George White's Scandals of 1939. She remained at RKO until 1940.

Miller was famed for her speed in tap dancing. Studio publicists drafted press releases claiming that she could tap 500 times per minute, but because the stage floors were waxed and too slick for regular tap shoes, she had to dance in shoes with rubber treads on the soles. Then, like all other film dancers of the time -- including Fred Astaire, Eleanor Powell, Gene Kelly, etc. -- she would then loop or 'dub' the sound of the taps while watching the film and dance on a "tap board" to match her steps in the film.

In later life, Miller claimed to have invented pantyhose in the 1940s as a solution to the continual problem of torn stockings during the filming of dance-production numbers. The common practice had been to sew hosiery to briefs, and if torn, the entire garment had to be removed and resewn with a new pair. Miller asked a hosiery maker to produce a single combined garment.

==== Republic and Columbia Pictures ====
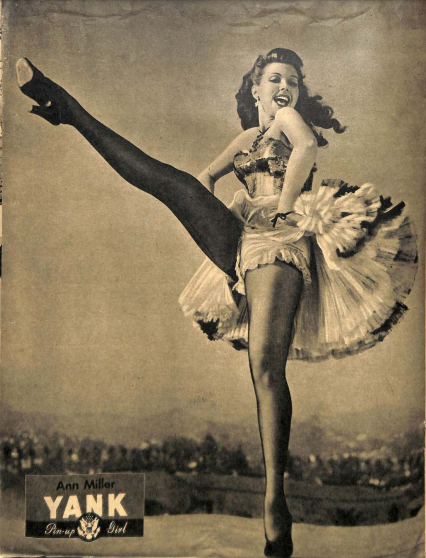
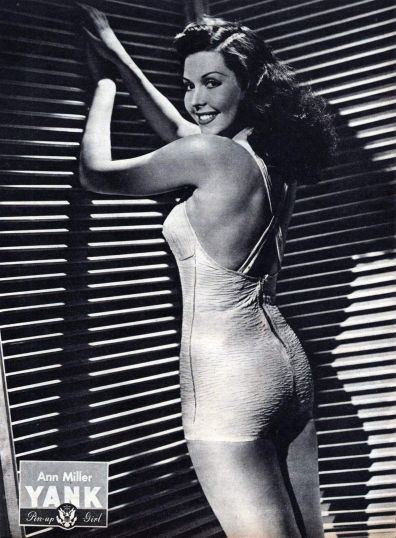
Pin-up photos of Miller for Yank, the Army Weekly: 1943 (left) and 1945 (right)

Miller made two films for Republic, Hit Parade of 1941 (1940) and Melody Ranch (1940) with Gene Autry.

In 1941, Miller signed with Columbia Pictures starring in 11 B musicals from 1941 to 1945, beginning with Time Out for Rhythm with Rudy Vallee. Miller followed it with Go West, Young Lady (1941), True to the Army (1942), Priorities on Parade (1942), Reveille with Beverly (1943), What's Buzzin', Cousin? (1943), Hey, Rookie (1943), Sailor's Holiday (1944), Jam Session (1944), Carolina Blues (1945), Eadie Was a Lady (1945), and Eve Knew Her Apples (1945), a musical remake of It Happened One Night.

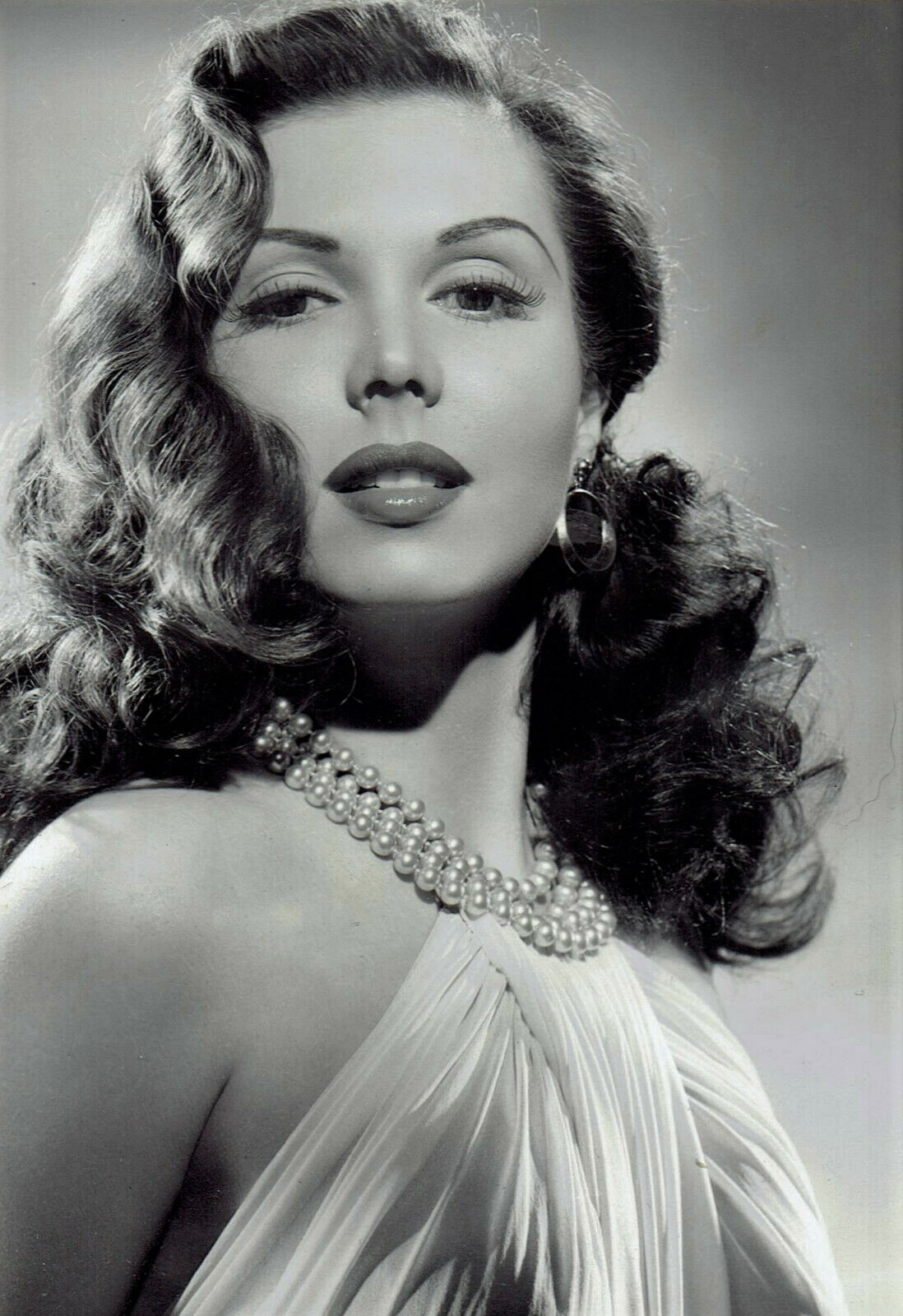
Miller in 1946, by Ned Scott

In July 1945, Miller posed in a bathing suit as a Yank pin-up girl. She ended her contract in 1946 with one A film, The Thrill of Brazil. An advertisement for the film in Life featured Miller's leg in a stocking tied with a large red bow as the "T" in "Thrill."

==== MGM ====
After leaving Columbia and recovering from an injury, Miller was hired as a contract player at Metro-Goldwyn-Mayer (MGM). Her first appearance was in Easter Parade (1948), in which she co-starred alongside Fred Astaire and Judy Garland.

During her tenure at MGM, Miller usually appeared as the secondary female lead in musical films such as The Kissing Bandit (1948), On the Town (1949), Watch the Birdie with Red Skelton, Texas Carnival (1951) with Esther Williams, Two Tickets to Broadway (1951), Lovely to Look At (1952), Small Town Girl (1953), Kiss Me Kate (1953), Deep in My Heart (1954), Hit the Deck (1955), and The Opposite Sex (1956). Her last MGM film was a flop nonmusical comedy The Great American Pastime (1956).

=== 1957–1989: Stage work ===
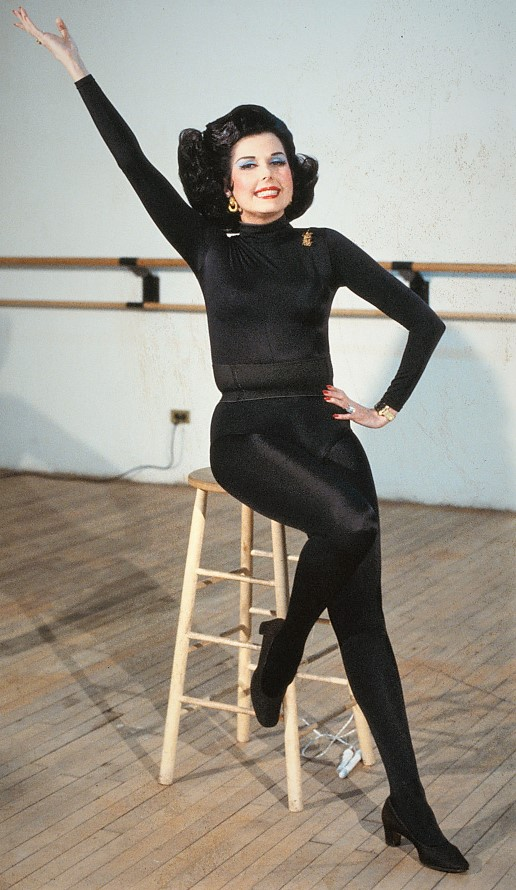
Miller in Sugar Babies, 1979

As the studio system and musical films began to fade in the late 1950s, Miller turned her attention to theater and television appearances. She became known later for her distinctive appearance, which reflected a studio-era ideal of glamour - black, bouffant hairdo, heavy makeup with a splash of crimson lipstick, and fashions that emphasized her figure and long legs.

In May 1969, Miller made a comeback on Broadway when she took over the title role in the musical Mame, dancing a tap number created for her. Miller remained in the role until the show closed in January 1970. The following year, she headlined a television production of Dames at Sea alongside Ann-Margret for NBC.

She also appeared in an iconic television commercial for "The Great American Soup" (created by Stan Freberg), in which she rose through the floor atop an eight-foot-high cylinder designed to resemble a giant soup can. The advertisement was intended as a spectacular song-and-dance number in the tradition of the musicals in which she had starred.

Miller began touring with theater productions such as Hello, Dolly! and Panama Hattie. In 1979, she appeared in the Broadway show Sugar Babies with fellow MGM veteran Mickey Rooney, for which she was nominated for a Tony Award. The duo toured the country extensively after the show's Broadway run. In 1983, she won the Sarah Siddons Award for her work in Chicago theatre, On May 1, 1989, at the age of 66, Miller sang and tap-danced to "42nd Street" at the opening of the Disney MGM Studios, her last live dance performance.

Miller appeared in a special 1982 episode of The Love Boat, joined by fellow showbiz legends Ethel Merman, Carol Channing, Della Reese, Van Johnson, and Cab Calloway in a storyline that cast them as older relatives of the show's regular characters. Miller also published two books. Her first was an autobiography, Miller's High Life (1972). Her second was Tapping into the Force (1990), a book about her experiences in the psychic world.

=== 1990–2001: Final projects ===
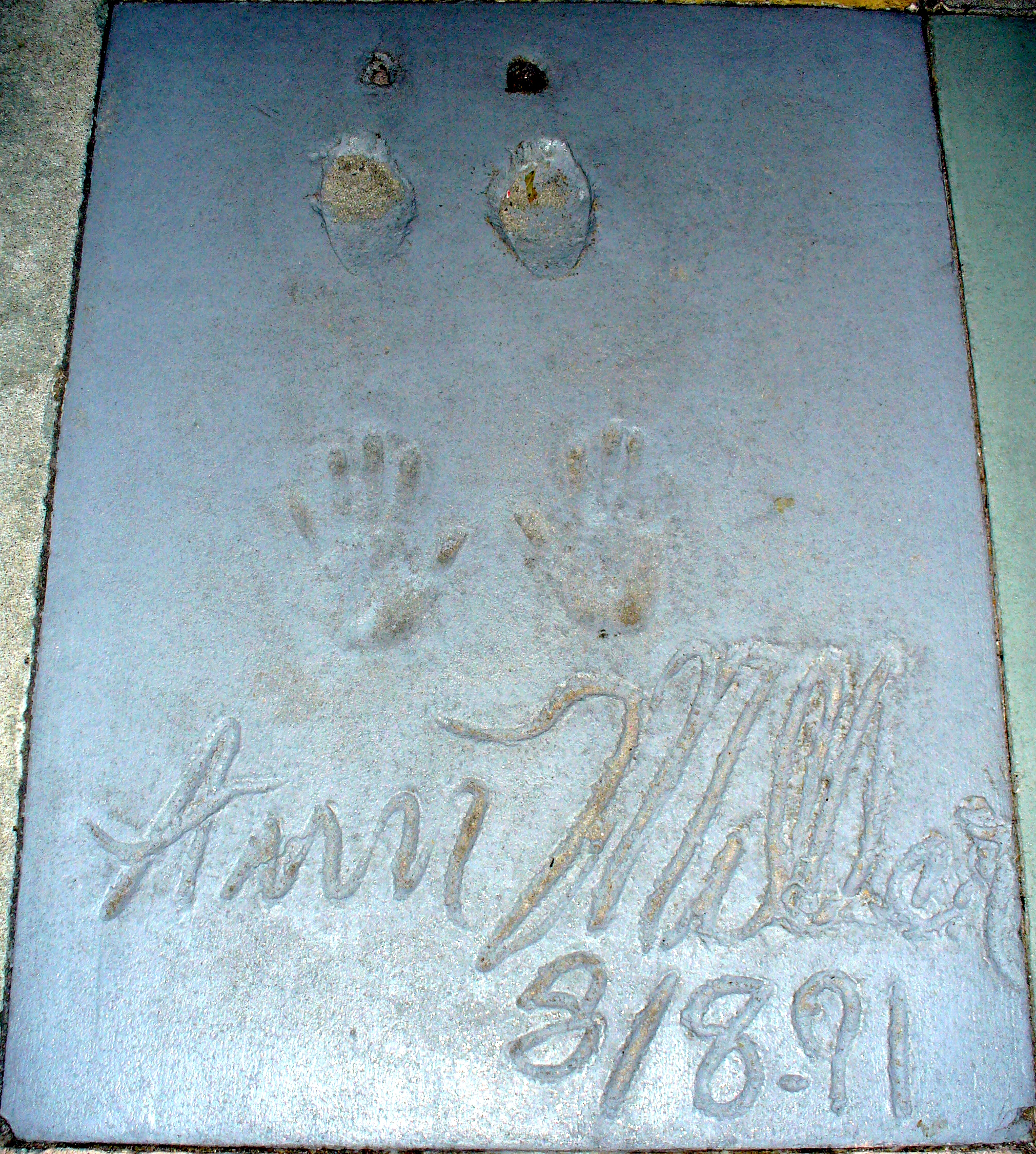
The handprints of Ann Miller in front of the Great Movie Ride at Walt Disney World's Disney's Hollywood Studios theme park

During the 1990s, Miller rose as a popular figure to interview for her time in the Golden Age of Hollywood. She was the subject of This Is Your Life on British television in 1993, when she was surprised by Michael Aspel at the studios of CBS Television City. That same year, she appeared as a dance instructor in the Home Improvement episode "Dances with Tools".

Miller's last stage performance was a 1998 Paper Mill Playhouse production of Stephen Sondheim's Follies, in which she played hard-boiled Carlotta Campion and received rave reviews for her rendition of the song "I'm Still Here". Miller played her last role as landlady Coco in director David Lynch's critically acclaimed 2001 film Mulholland Drive.

Between 1995 and 2001, Molly Shannon parodied Miller several times on Saturday Night Live in a recurring sketch titled "Leg-Up!",

== Personal life ==
Miller was married three times, to Reese Llewellyn Milner from 1946 to 1947, to William Moss from 1958 to 1961, and to Arthur Cameron from 1961 to 1962. Between marriages, she dated well-known men such as Howard Hughes and Conrad Hilton. In 1944, Louis B. Mayer proposed to her despite his being married.

During her marriage to Milner, Miller became pregnant. During her last trimester, Milner threw her down a flight of stairs, breaking her back and causing her to experience premature labor. Her baby, Mary, lived only three hours on November 12, 1946. Miller filed for divorce shortly after. She alleged that her second husband was also abusive.

=== Death ===
Miller died from lung cancer at Cedars-Sinai Medical Center in Los Angeles on January 22, 2004, at the age of 80. Confusion over her age persisted after her death: The Guardian gave her age as 82, the Los Angeles Times said she was 81, and The New York Times cautiously said "she was believed to be about 80". Her remains were interred near her infant daughter in Holy Cross Cemetery in Culver City, California.

For her contribution to the motion-picture industry, Miller has a star on the Hollywood Walk of Fame at 6914 Hollywood Boulevard. In 1998, a Golden Palm Star on the Palm Springs Walk of Stars was dedicated to her. To honor Miller's contribution to dance, the Smithsonian Institution displays her favorite pair of tap shoes, which she playfully nicknamed "Moe and Joe".

== Work ==
=== Film ===
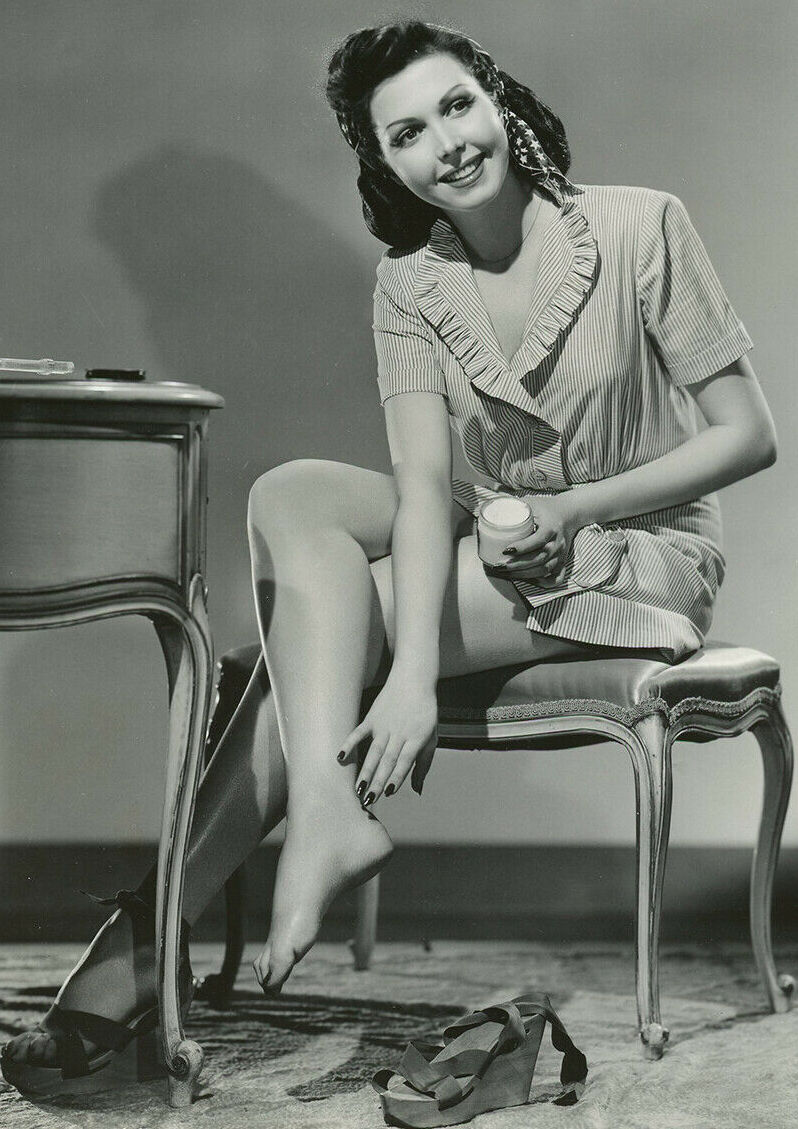
Promotional image of Miller for Jam Session (1944)

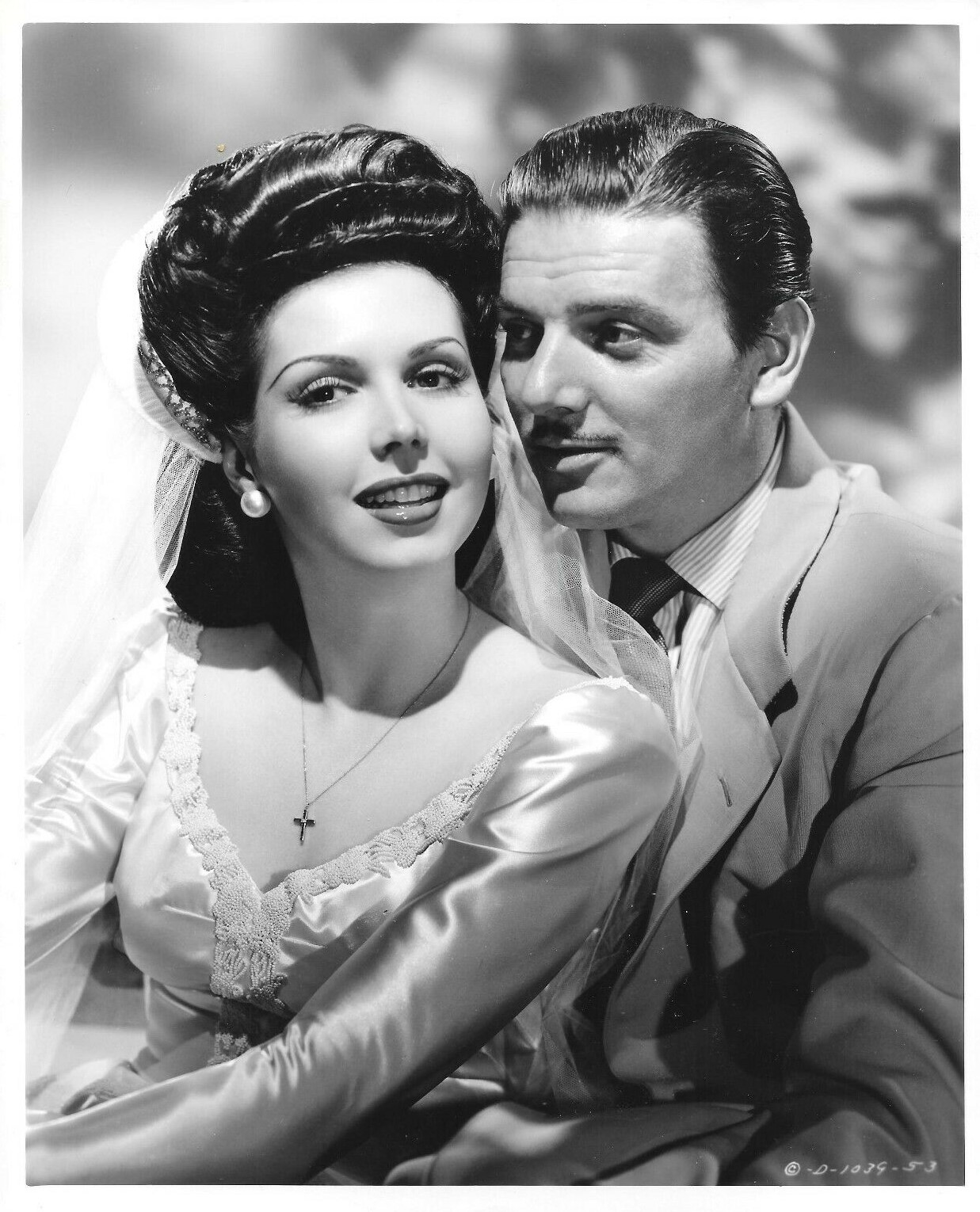
Miller with William Wright in Eve Knew Her Apples (1945)

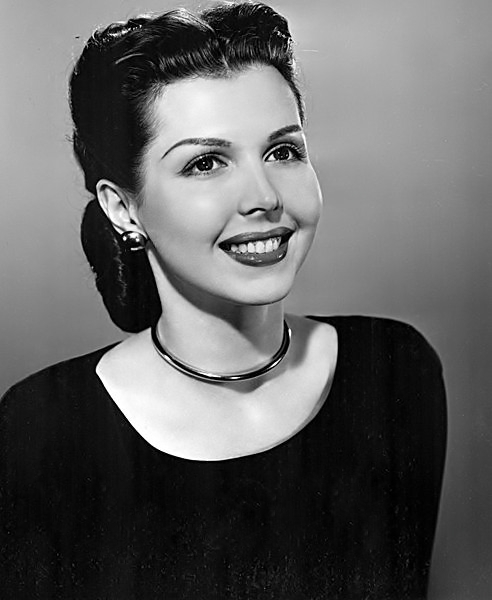
Publicity photo of Miller for Easter Parade (1948)

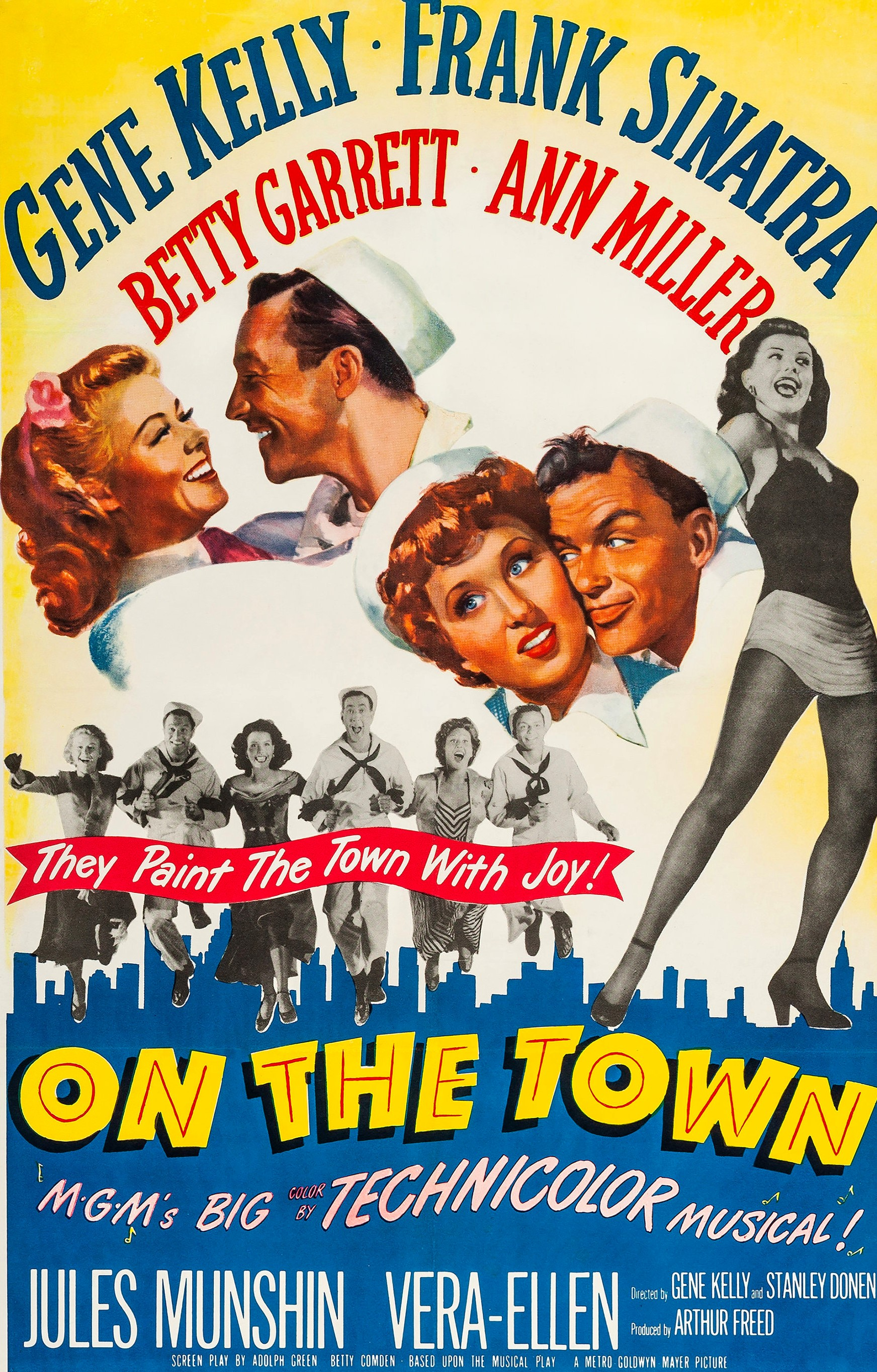
Theatrical release poster of On the Town (1949), featuring Miller

| Year | Title | Role | Notes |
|---|---|---|---|
| 1934 | Anne of Green Gables | School Girl | Uncredited |
| 1935 | The Good Fairy | Schoolgirl in Orphanage | Uncredited |
| 1936 | The Devil on Horseback | Dancer | Uncredited |
| 1937 | New Faces of 1937 | Herself, Dance Specialty | |
| 1937 | The Life of the Party | Betty | |
| 1937 | Stage Door | Annie | |
| 1938 | Radio City Revels | Billie Shaw | |
| 1938 | Having Wonderful Time | Camp Guest | Uncredited |
| 1938 | You Can't Take It with You | Essie Carmichael | |
| 1938 | Room Service | Hilda Manny | |
| 1938 | Tarnished Angel | Violet 'Vi' McMaster | |
| 1940 | Too Many Girls | Pepe | |
| 1940 | Hit Parade of 1941 | Anabelle Potter | |
| 1940 | Melody Ranch | Julie Shelton | |
| 1941 | Time Out for Rhythm | Kitty Brown | |
| 1941 | Go West, Young Lady | Lola | |
| 1942 | True to the Army | Vicki Marlow | |
| 1942 | Priorities on Parade | Donna D'Arcy | |
| 1943 | Reveille with Beverly | Beverly Ross | |
| 1943 | What's Buzzin', Cousin? | Ann Crawford | |
| 1944 | Hey, Rookie | Winnie Clark | |
| 1944 | Sailor's Holiday | Herself | |
| 1944 | Jam Session | Terry Baxter | |
| 1944 | Carolina Blues | Julie Carver | |
| 1945 | Eadie Was a Lady | Eadie Allen and Edithea Alden | |
| 1945 | Eve Knew Her Apples | Eve Porter | |
| 1946 | The Thrill of Brazil | Linda Lorens | Alternative title: Dancing Down to Rio |
| 1948 | Easter Parade | Nadine Hale | |
| 1948 | The Kissing Bandit | Fiesta Specialty Dancer | |
| 1949 | On the Town | Claire Huddesen | |
| 1950 | Watch the Birdie | Miss Lucky Vista | |
| 1951 | Texas Carnival | Sunshine Jackson | |
| 1951 | Two Tickets to Broadway | Joyce Campbell | |
| 1952 | Lovely to Look At | Bubbles Cassidy | |
| 1953 | Small Town Girl | Lisa Bellmount | |
| 1953 | Kiss Me Kate | Lois Lane 'Bianca' | |
| 1954 | Deep in My Heart | Performer in 'Artists and Models' | |
| 1955 | Hit the Deck | Ginger | |
| 1956 | The Opposite Sex | Gloria Dell | |
| 1956 | The Great American Pastime | Mrs. Doris Patterson | |
| 1976 | Won Ton Ton, the Dog Who Saved Hollywood | President's Girl 2 | |
| 2001 | Mulholland Drive | Catherine 'Coco' Lenoix | Final film role |

=== Television ===
| Year | Title | Role | Notes |
|---|---|---|---|
| 1953 | Lux Video Theatre | Intermission Guest | Episode - "Three Just Me" |
| 1956 | What's My Line? | herself | October 7, 1956 |
| 1971 | Dames at Sea | Mona | TV adaptation of stage musical |
| 1972 | Love, American Style | | Episode - "Love and the Christmas Punch" |
| 1982 | The Love Boat | Connie Carruthers | Episode - "The Musical/My Ex-Mom/The Show Must Go On/The Pest/My Aunt, the Worrier" (Part 1); Episode - "The Musical/My Ex-Mom/The Show Must Go On/The Pest/My Aunt, the Worrier" (Part 2) |
| 1990 | Out of This World | Elsie Vanderhoff | Episode - "Diamond's Are Evie's Best Friend" |
| 1993 | Home Improvement | Mrs. Keeney | Episode - "Dances with Tools" |
| 2003 | 100 Greatest | Self | Contributor, Episode - "The 100 Greatest Musicals". |

=== Theatre ===
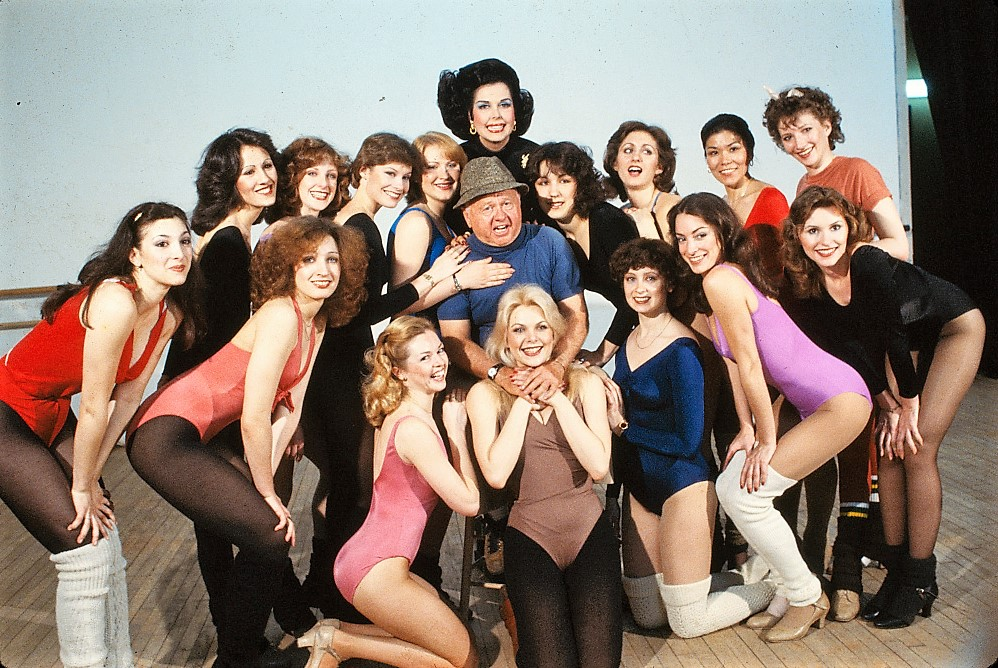
Miller (at the back) with the cast of Sugar Babies in 1979

| Year | Film | Role | Notes |
|---|---|---|---|
| 1939 | George White's Scandals of 1939 | Performer | Broadway: Alvin Theatre |
| 1968 | Can-Can | Performer | |
| 1969 | Mame | Mame Dennis | Broadway: Winter Garden Theatre |
| 1971 | Hello, Dolly! | Dolly Gallagher Levi | Kenley Players |
| 1972 | Anything Goes | Reno Sweeney | Regional, New Jersey |
| 1973 | Blithe Spirit | Elvira | Little Theatre on Square |
| 1976 | Panama Hattie | Hattie Maloney | Syracuse Artists Playhouse |
| 1978 | Cactus Flower | Stephanie | Regional |
| 1979-82 | Sugar Babies | Ann | Broadway: Mark Hellinger Theatre |
| 1998 | Follies | Carlotta Campion | Paper Mill Playhouse, Millburn, New Jersey |

== Awards and nominations ==
| Year | Award | Category | Nominated work | Result | Ref. |
|---|---|---|---|---|---|
| 1980 | Tony Awards | Best Actress in a Musical | Sugar Babies | Nominated | |
| 1980 | Drama Desk Awards | Outstanding Actress in a Musical | Sugar Babies | Nominated | |
| 1988 | Laurence Olivier Awards | Best Actress in a Musical | Sugar Babies | Nominated | |

On February 8, 1960, Miller received a star on the Hollywood Walk of Fame at 6914 Hollywood Blvd.

== See also ==
- List of dancers
