= Shaaron Claridge =

American actress (1938–2021)

Shaaron Claridge (born Shaaron Lee Cooper; later Snead; October 1, 1938 – September 15, 2021) was an American second-shift radiotelephone operator or police radio dispatcher at the Van Nuys Division of the Los Angeles Police Department (LAPD) best known for her voice work on the Adam-12 television series.

Claridge was born in Los Angeles County, California. At the time of her appointment, women were desired as police radio dispatchers because LAPD psychologists thought that women's voices would have a more soothing and calming effect over the airwaves. The idea was that, should an officer (male) have been pinned down by gunfire and/or wounded, yet was still within radio contact, hearing the female dispatcher's tone would help keep the officer from panicking until back-up arrived at the scene. Her husband was an LAPD motorcycle officer.

For a time from the late 1960s into the late 1970s, Claridge was a voice actress credited with providing police dispatch voice work for Adam-12 and also a few other television shows (i.e., Dragnet, Lou Grant and Columbo). Her voice work as the police dispatcher ("1-Adam-12, 1-Adam-12, see the man . . .") was featured in all but three episodes of Adam-12 ("Elegy for a Pig", "Hollywood Division" and "Clinic on Eighteenth Street"). She was seen onscreen once in her role as a dispatcher in the fifth-season episode "Suspended" in which she has a brief conversation with Officer Pete Malloy (Martin Milner).

However, it appears that certain steps were taken to ensure that she would not be recognized, such as the camera angles used in the sequence: when Milner first walks into the room, the camera is across the room and only her left profile is seen at a distance. But for the close-up, the camera is positioned above Claridge's head, over her left shoulder, and aimed down and diagonally to make it hard for the viewer to make out much in the way of her facial features.

In the 1983 suspense/action movie Blue Thunder, starring Roy Scheider, Claridge's voice was again heard as an LAPD dispatcher in an uncredited role. She also voiced police dispatch in the 1970 Disney film "The Boatniks".

Following Milner's death on September 6, 2015, Claridge broadcast the "End of Watch" transmission over the LAPD radio recognizing Milner's performance as Officer Pete Malloy in Adam-12.

== Marriages ==
On January 12, 1963, she married Frank Walter Claridge. That marriage was later dissolved. On March 17, 1980, she wed Rodney Snead, to whom she remained married until his death.

== Death ==
Claridge died of complications from liver cancer at Minden, Nevada, on September 15, 2021 at the age of 82.
