= List of Adam-12 episodes =

This is a list of episodes for the 1968–1975 television series Adam-12 with a total of 174 episodes. The first season was released on DVD in 2005 by Universal Home Entertainment, while all remaining seasons were released by Shout! Factory.

== Series overview ==
Season	Episodes	Originally released	
Season	Episodes	First released	Last released
1	26	September 21, 1968	April 5, 1969
2	26	September 20, 1969	May 9, 1970
3	26	September 19, 1970	April 8, 1971
4	24	September 15, 1971	March 15, 1972
5	24	September 13, 1972	March 21, 1973
6	24	September 12, 1973	March 19, 1974
7	24	September 24, 1974	May 20, 1975

== Episodes ==
=== Season 1 (1968–69) ===
No. overall	No. in season	Title	Directed by	Written by	Original release date
1	1	"Log 1: The Impossible Mission"	Jack Webb	John Randolph	September 21, 1968
Officer Pete Malloy (Martin Milner) plans to retire after his partner is shot and killed while attempting to arrest an armed robber. On what is to be his last day in the LAPD, he is assigned to take rookie Officer Jim Reed (Kent McCord) out for his first patrol. Reed shows tremendous potential but, like all probationary officers, still has much to learn. Calls include a pursuit through Tujunga Wash, a baby not breathing, a lady who thinks she felt a salamander crawling under her dress (Ann Morgan Guilbert), and a demonstration that turns violent. During the demonstration shooting, Reed disobeys Malloy's orders and rushes into the darkness, eventually returning unharmed with all three suspects in custody. With encouragement from Lieutenant Moore, Malloy agrees to stay with the LAPD and guide Reed through his probationary period.
2	2	"Log 141: The Color TV Bandit"	Phil Rawlins	Richard Neil Morgan	September 28, 1968
Malloy and Reed try to track down a burglar whose specialty is stealing color TV sets, but end up arresting a jewel thief. While on patrol, Malloy and Reed pull over and give a woman (who slurs them with anti-police rhetoric) a traffic ticket. They also encounter a drug-addicted mother who uses her children to help her in maintaining her habit. Melody Patterson and Cloris Leachman guest-star.
3	3	"Log 11: It's Just a Little Dent, Isn't It?"	Hollingsworth Morse	Preston Wood	October 5, 1968
Reed accidentally dents the police car while at the gas pump and worries about the consequences he could face. Other calls include a prowler terrorizing women in a neighborhood, and a man holding a baby at gunpoint.
4	4	"Log 131: Reed, the Dicks Have Their Job and We Have Ours"	Hollingsworth Morse	Preston Wood	October 12, 1968
Reed learns how important his job is and why detectives are called to investigate homicides when he and Malloy are called to a fatal shooting. Other calls includes a missing child, people parking illegally at hot dog stand, Malloy and Reed responding to a domestic, and the officers pursue two men with drugs.
5	5	"Log 91: You're Not the First Guy's Had the Problem"	Alan Crosland	Preston Wood	October 19, 1968
Officer Stenzler, Reed's best friend from the police academy, is critically wounded during an armed robbery call. Malloy, who has just gone through the same experience weeks earlier with his partner, helps him focus, but Stenzler dies of his injuries. Calls include a drunk driver and bicycle burglars.
6	6	"Log 161: And You Want Me to Get Married!"	Phil Rawlins	Preston Wood	October 26, 1968
By now, Malloy and Reed are becoming off-duty friends, (following Stenzler's death) and after having dinner and an evening of socializing with Reed and Jean his wife, Malloy's girlfriend Donna wants to take their relationship to the next level. However, calls during the next shift, a liquor store being rob twice, Malloy and Reed rescued a woman trapped underneath her car, and namely a domestic dispute, solidify Malloy's belief that he is satisfied being a bachelor.
7	7	"Log 71: I Feel Like a Fool, Malloy"	Alan Crosland	Robert I. Holt	November 2, 1968
In an episode where Reed learns to keep his wits under control, the officers deal with a loud noise complaint where an elderly woman refuses to answer, much less acknowledge, a teenaged girl's desperate pleas for help after the woman learns she was at a house where loud party music is being played, and it leads to a tragic drowning of a 4-year-old girl in a backyard swimming pool. Other calls include a brawl at a pop-spirituality temple on the verge of a schism over, meditation styles, a young woman leading the officers on a chase and a misused silent alarm at a liquor store.
8	8	"Log 72: El Presidente"	Phil Rawlins	Robert H. Forward	November 9, 1968
Amzie Strickland as Agatha Zephyr and Eve McVeagh as Thelma Walker, bicker over the latter's husband Stafford Repp, who is annoyed by both of them. Del Moore as Ted Wilson, the president of a local booster club, who on a trip to Mexico, is mistaken for President of the United States. Reed goes to Malloy for advice on calculating the cost of a new baby, meanwhile handling a variety of calls, including a psychopath who is shooting up a neighborhood.
9	9	"Log 101: Someone Stole My Lawn"	Hollingsworth Morse	Tom Dunphy	November 16, 1968
Reed is put on a low-carb diet by his wife, Jean. Meanwhile, a resident complains that landscapers literally stole his lawn, a woman reports her step son and his friend for selling credit cards, and Malloy and Reed spots suspicious a man at car dealership.
10	10	"Log 132: Producer"	Phil Rawlins	Richard Neil Morgan	November 30, 1968
As Reed and Malloy track down a prowler, a silent alarm leading the officers to a robbery, and deal with a young boy who somehow got his head stuck in a fence, Reed tries to pawn off his dog's litter of puppies.
11	11	"Log 111: The Boa Constrictor"	Hollingsworth Morse	Preston Wood	December 7, 1968
A young woman reports her car, a 1958 Ford convertible, stolen. The only clue Malloy and Reed have to go on is that a large boa constrictor is kept in the trunk. Reed and Malloy have to keep their wits when stopping every car matching the description, but happening upon a garage burglary provides the biggest clue. Other calls include Malloy and Reed rescuing two drug addicts from a fire, a domestic dispute over a Water hose, and a man caught with marijuana in the trunk of his car.
12	12	"Log 61: The Runaway"	Phil Rawlins	Noel Nosseck	December 14, 1968
Reed gets excited when he is asked to help out on his first big drug bust, but it turns out to be a disappointment through no fault of his own. Meanwhile, Malloy and Reed help out with a teenaged girl who has run away from home and is staying with a single man twice her age. Crossover on December 12, 1968, Malloy and Reed guest-starred as themselves in an episode of a similar show Dragnet.
13	13	"Log 122: Christmas – The Yellow Dump Truck"	Hollingsworth Morse	Preston Wood	December 21, 1968
Malloy and Reed distribute donated Christmas care boxes to families in need, but things take a turn when a poor mother's car is stolen with her Christmas gifts inside. Bob Hastings guest-stars in a husband-wife dispute that gets out of control.
14	14	"Log 81: The Long Walk"	Phil Rawlins	Robert C. Dennis	January 4, 1969
Reed learns the importance of backing up his partner when he and Malloy respond to a silent alarm and wind up in a warehouse shootout with three armed suspects.
15	15	"Log 32: Jimmy Eisley's Dealing Smack"	Hollingsworth Morse	Preston Wood	January 11, 1969
As they try to find a suitable headlining performer for the department party, Malloy and Reed break up a narcotics ring when they raid the apartment of a dope pusher. Reed, chairman of the party's entertainment committee, finally finds his performer when he serves a subpoena on a country music entertainer who is a witness in a tax case.
16	16	"Log 62: Grand Theft Horse?"	Hollingsworth Morse	Richard Neil Morgan	January 18, 1969
A homesick Texan is the prime suspect in a horse rustling case; Reed and Malloy have to deal with a would-be eloping runaway girl; a robber makes fake calls to distract the police, which ends up with the officers engaging in a high-speed shootout with the fleeing thieves.
17	17	"Log 33: It All Happened So Fast"	Bruce Kessler	Preston Wood	February 1, 1969
For the first time in his career, Reed shoots and kills someone, a 16-year-old sniper, in self-defense. Internal Affairs investigates the officers to determine whether it was a justified shooting.
18	18	"Log 112: You Blew It"	Hollingsworth Morse	Michael Donovan	February 8, 1969
Malloy is the one who blows it twice, first when he gets decked by a surly bar patron and again when he and Reed leave a traffic violation stop to respond to a man-with-a-knife disturbance before the NCIC wants-and-warrants check is completed. It is only later, after Lieutenant Moore yells at them, that they learn the traffic violator was wanted for armed robbery and was driving a stolen car, leading the two officers to find a way to capture their man. The two officers are unable to prevent a young woman's suicide. To Malloy's embarrassment, the bar patron who assaulted him is later arrested...and is only 4 feet (1.2 m) tall!
19	19	"Log 51: A Jumper – Code Two"	Harry Morgan	Richard Neil Morgan	February 15, 1969
Malloy tries a dangerous solution to capturing a suicide jumper at an apartment building. Earlier, Malloy and Reed are called to help an elderly woman (Katherine Squire) who wants them to adjust her TV antenna; they also stop a driver (Hal Smith) for drunk driving and having no driver license.
20	20	"Log 73: I'm Still a Cop Carlton"	Phil Rawlins	Harold Jack Bloom	February 22, 1969
Malloy is studying for his master's degree in criminal justice, but unrest at the college becomes the least of his worries when several of his students, who are planning an anti-war protest, learn the occupation of their fellow student. Anne Helm as Peg Tompkins.
21	21	"Log 102: We Can't Just Walk Away from It"	Hollingsworth Morse	Michael Donovan	March 1, 1969
While investigating a drug overdose case, Malloy and Reed race against time to stop an emotionally-on-the-edge 17-year-old drug user from killing himself, and must convince the distraught mother and overbearing father (Scott Brady (actor)) to help them save their son.
22	22	"Log 152: A Dead Cop Can't Help Anyone"	Hollingsworth Morse	Michael Donovan	March 8, 1969
An impressionable Reed is taken in by the "cowboy cop" antics of fellow Officer Ed Wells a wise guy who takes unnecessary and reckless risks to arrest suspects. Another call where the officers mistakes a father taking his son to the barber for a kidnap child. The next day at the station, Malloy gets mad while talking to Wells because Wells' tactics endanger his life and others. Wells tries to play it down until his recklessness nearly catches up with him when he is shot in the shoulder by a psychotic sniper, and because of Wells' disobedience and foolishness Reed is also almost shot. Malloy and Reed are forced to rescue Wells and mastermind a way to end the standoff peacefully. It includes Barry Williams, then soon to be a regular in The Brady Bunch. Note: This is Gary Crosby first appearance as officer Ed Wells.
23	23	"Log 12: He – He Was Trying to Kill Me"	Hollingsworth Morse	Robert I. Holt	March 15, 1969
Reed and Malloy respond to a case of child neglect and abuse when a 6-year-old girl (Dawn Lyn) is home alone in her apartment caring for her baby sister, who is later found lying on blankets in the bathtub, and both parents (the mother a wannabe model and the father a drifter) are unable to provide for their children.
24	24	"Log 172: Boy... the Things You Do for the Job"	Hollingsworth Morse	Michael Donovan	March 22, 1969
A rich and beautiful young woman (Anna Capri) becomes obsessed with Malloy after he pulls her over for a traffic violation and is not bowled over by her charms. Features an unusual ending: Malloy eventually does go on a date with the woman, but the outcome is left ambiguous.
25	25	"Log 92: Tell Him He Pushed Back a Little Too Hard"	Phil Rawlins	Preston Wood	March 29, 1969
Malloy and Reed respond numerous times to a dispute between two neighbors who continually argue over the motorboat they jointly own, a situation that escalates in severity each time the officers respond until, despite the officers' best efforts, there is a tragic outcome. Dick Sargent guest-stars.
26	26	"Log 22: ...So This Little Guy Goes into This Bar, and..."	Phil Rawlins	Preston Wood	April 5, 1969
Reed struggles to tell Malloy a bar joke he heard from Officer Wells, and finds problems when it doesn't exactly stick. Other calls include an elderly woman who misplaced her mink scarf in the freezer, a phony marital dispute, and a noise complaint resulting from a party hosted by one of Reed's former high school classmates.

=== Season 2 (1969–70) ===
No. overall	No. in season	Title	Directed by	Written by	Original release date
27	1	"Log 15: Exactly One Hundred Yards"	Joseph Pevney	Jack Hawn	September 20, 1969
Malloy and Reed do community relations work as part of the LAPD's "Policeman Bill" program while training for the Police Olympics. While most of the kids at the school they're visiting are enthusiastic about the program, one kid (Butch Patrick) seems to have a bad attitude.
28	2	"Log 153: Find Me a Needle"	Robert Douglas	Guerdon Trueblood	September 27, 1969
A rapist has been stalking female hitchhikers, killing them and dumping their bodies on Mulholland Drive. So far, there have been six victims, and Malloy, Reed and Det. Sgt. Miller hope a suspect can lead them to a possible seventh.
29	3	"Log 52: Good Cop – Handle with Care"	Robert Douglas	Preston Wood	October 4, 1969
A pair of freelance reporters are determined to create a story about police brutality, and harass Reed and Malloy as their marks. The officers warn them to cease their behavior, but their continued refusal leads to innocent people getting hurt.
30	4	"Log 23: Pig Is a Three Letter Word"	Joseph Pevney	James Doherty	October 11, 1969
Reed busts his first sex offender, who was caught brutally raping a 5-year-old boy in a park restroom, and gets frustrated when he learns the boy died. The officers later find trouble when an arrest in a predominantly Black neighborhood almost sparks a race riot. Another call involves a possible dead body that turns out to be rotting fish.
31	5	"Log 83: A Different Thing"	Robert Douglas	Richard Neil Morgan	October 18, 1969
Malloy and Reed investigate a hit and run, and must seek out the suspect during a crime wave.
32	6	"Log 103: A Sound Like Thunder"	Joseph Pevney	James Doherty	November 1, 1969
Malloy, Reed, Malloy's current girlfriend (a nurse) and a pregnant Jean Reed visit a ghost town on the officers' day off, but find themselves besieged by a gang of outlaw bikers.
33	7	"Log 63: Baby"	Joseph Pevney	Guerdon Trueblood	November 8, 1969
Reed's wife goes to the hospital to have their child, but Reed, who has decided not to take the day off, has a hard time in between calls keeping tabs on her over the phone while she's there.
34	8	"Log 93: Once a Junkie"	Joseph Pevney	Jack Hawn	November 22, 1969
An ex-junkie is the suspect in an assault and robbery case and Reed and Malloy are assigned the case.
35	9	"Log 123: Courtroom"	Joseph Pevney	Richard Neil Morgan	November 29, 1969
Reed and Malloy are accused of overstepping the parameters of a traffic warrant by a suspect found to be in possession of illegal drugs.
36	10	"Log 143: The Cave"	Alan Crosland	Robert I. Holt	December 13, 1969
Just a typical day on patrol with calls ranging from a stoned hippie to the search for a runaway child, mostly centered around a neighborhood near the (at the time) unfinished Interstate 5.
37	11	"Log 142: As High as You Are"	Robert Douglas	Guerdon Trueblood	December 20, 1969
Reed and Malloy investigate a warehouse break-in and find an injured suspect in a wheelchair, but are harassed by neighborhood thugs seeking revenge for a past incident. Later, they investigate a disturbance at an apartment involving a pet lion.
38	12	"Log 43: Hostage"	Joseph Pevney	Robert Hamner	January 3, 1970
While getting lunch at a local café, Malloy is seriously wounded by two escaped prisoners who are holding the officer and the other patrons hostage. Reed and the LAPD SWAT team must get everyone out alive.
39	13	"Log 34: Astro"	Robert Douglas	Guerdon Trueblood	January 10, 1970
With the LAPD Air Support Division now deploying helicopters in full force, Malloy and Reed deal with a couple locked in a safe room, then call air support to stop two armed robbery suspects fleeing on a motorcycle.
40	14	"Log 14: S.W.A.T."	Alan Crosland	Michael Donovan	January 24, 1970
Malloy and Reed, assigned to the LAPD SWAT team, are called in to handle a sniper.
41	15	"Log 64: Bottom of the Bottle"	Alan Crosland	Robert I. Holt	January 31, 1970
Malloy and Reed handle the same alcoholic man twice in one night, at a brawl and then later at a shooting call.
42	16	"Log 54: Impersonation"	Joseph Pevney	Robert I. Holt	February 7, 1970
An investigator for the Rampart Division is suspected of defrauding residents of their money.
43	17	"Log 24: A Rare Occasion"	Robert Douglas	Robert I. Holt	February 14, 1970
When Malloy is invited over to Reed's house for a barbecue on their day off, they must deal with a young man (David Cassidy) on drugs.
44	18	"Log 124: Airport"	Alan Crosland	James Doherty	February 28, 1970
Malloy and Reed's shift this day includes calls concerning a runaway girl, a robbery at a grocery store, and a stolen aircraft.
45	19	"Log 94: Vengeance"	Alan Crosland	James Doherty	March 7, 1970
Today's calls for Malloy and Reed include the investigation of a car theft gang, the robbery of a liquor store, and a child who gets trapped in a refrigerator. Luana Patten guest stars.
46	20	"Log 104: The Bomb"	Jean Yarbrough	Robert I. Holt	March 14, 1970
Malloy and Reed take cases ranging from street racers to robbers to a bomb threat to a suicide attempt.
47	21	"Log 74: Light Duty"	Alan Crosland	Guerdon Trueblood	March 21, 1970
After breaking his wrist, Malloy gets reassigned to desk duty while Reed is called out to assist with a potential riot.
48	22	"Log 114: The Hero"	Joseph Pevney	Don Ingalls	March 28, 1970
Malloy and Reed assist firemen at a burning warehouse, but a young man who rescues a trapped victim seems reluctant to be recognized and honored as a hero. Natividad Vacío, A Martinez
49	23	"Log 134: Child Stealer"	Alan Crosland	James Doherty	April 4, 1970
Malloy and Reed chase down a suspected kidnapper, arrest carjackers, and run down an escaped prisoner.
50	24	"Log 144: Bank Robbery"	Joseph Pevney	James Doherty	April 11, 1970
Officers Malloy and Reed must deal with a domestic dispute involving a former professional wrestler.
51	25	"Log 44: Attempted Bribe"	Alan Crosland	James Doherty	April 18, 1970
The son of a rich businessman is arrested by Malloy and Reed for DUI, and his father tries to "influence" the officers' testimony; an elderly man is arrested after he confesses to killing his wife.
52	26	"Log 173: Shoplift"	Alan Crosland	Robert I. Holt	May 9, 1970
Malloy and Reed track a teenage female shoplifter who has escaped custody to the lair of a known con artist/cult leader; in a crossover from the 1968 Dragnet episode "The Big Prophet", Liam Sullivan guest stars as similar con artist/drug dealer.

=== Season 3 (1970–71) ===
No. overall	No. in season	Title	Directed by	Written by	Original release date
53	1	"Log 174: Loan Sharks"	Bruce Kessler	Michael Donovan	September 19, 1970
Malloy and Reed try to investigate a series of beatings at a plant resulting from a loan shark operation, but the employees refuse to talk until the son of one employee stands up to testify. The officers arrest an armed robber (Arthur Hunnicutt) who could only bring himself to steal $2, then was robbed himself.
54	2	"Log 35: Easy Bare Rider"	Bruce Kessler	Norman Katkov	September 26, 1970
Calls include a drunk and naked driver (Sidney Miller), a young boy who found a large sum of money and went on a spending spree, and a car parts theft ring inside a park.
55	3	"Log 95: Purse Snatcher"	James Neilson	Michael Donovan	October 3, 1970
Malloy and Reed assist Officer Brinkman in bringing down a ring of juvenile purse snatchers, the leader of which later commits an armed robbery and kills someone during the crime.
56	4	"Log 45: Bright Boy"	James Neilson	John T. Dugan	October 10, 1970
Malloy and Reed meet Harold, a young boy with a photographic memory, who alerts them to, and helps bring down, a group of home burglars disguised as movers. Other calls include stopping two female joyriders and two paint-sniffers shooting at a box of dynamite.
57	5	"Log 65: Cigarettes, Cars and Wild, Wild Women"	Christian Nyby	Norman Katkov	October 17, 1970
The officers bring down an auto-theft ring where young girls get rides with the victims, steal their cars, and take them to a "chop shop". Other calls include an elderly woman who ran a red light and whose license lists her in her 30s, a would-be motorcycle thief stopped by a feisty woman, a shut-in woman who thinks she is hallucinating while her nephew is hosting a marijuana party, and two men moving a safe down the street. Tony Dow and John Mitchum guest star.
58	6	"Log 55: Missing Child"	Christian Nyby	William P. McGivern	October 31, 1970
Malloy and Reed investigate a missing child with a Band-Aid on her leg. Other calls include rescuing a cat and birds from a woman who was trying to get rid of them using gas, apprehending a man who stole a disability check from his uncle, and responding to an auto burglary turned homicide with a Hispanic family more concerned with how the officers would treat them. Jodie Foster guest stars.
59	7	"Log 75: Have a Nice Weekend"	Oscar Rudolph	Robert I. Holt	November 7, 1970
The officers discover a burglary ring in an upper-class neighborhood consisting of a group of young kids, with their victims all being women playing Bridge. Other calls include Reed being held hostage by a crazy woman, and breaking up a fight between a church organist and the choir director over the choice of music. Butch Patrick guest stars.
60	8	"Log 105: Elegy for a Pig"	Christian Nyby	Norman Katkov	November 21, 1970
Malloy tells the story of his best friend, Officer Tom Porter (Mark Goddard), who was killed in the line of duty while chasing a suspect. Malloy reviews their history together, including applying for the LAPD together (and Porter meeting his wife that day), graduating from the Police Academy together, and their history in the LAPD on and off duty. Jack Webb provided the opening and closing narration.
61	9	"Log 25: Indians"	Oscar Rudolph	Robert I. Holt	November 28, 1970
Malloy and Reed have to stop a dispute between Native Americans from getting out of hand. Other calls include investigating a series of explosions and a shootout while looking for the suspects in the explosions, and an elderly woman who mistakes a pizza delivery man (Tim Donnelly of Emergency!) for a prowler. Billy Sands Guest stars.
62	10	"Log 135: Arson"	Christian Nyby	Arthur Dales	December 5, 1970
The officers investigate a series of arsons with different descriptions of the arsonist, a domestic involving a man, his wife, the man's female friend (Mary Grace Canfield of Green Acres), a football game; a man trapped on a ledge; and an escaped mental patient holding his wife at knifepoint. Mantan Moreland appears as Phillip Richards.
63	11	"Log 96: Pilgrimage"	Oscar Rudolph	John T. Dugan	December 19, 1970
Malloy and Reed confront a man who robbed a bell-ringing Santa Claus, handle a DUI causing a death transporting Christmas presents, encounter a single pregnant shoplifter who wanted to be caught so her children would have a place to stay for Christmas, and assist a Native American family from New Mexico whose young daughter had wandered off while they were sleeping in the hills. Foster Brooks guests as a DUI suspect.
64	12	"Log 85: Sign of the Twins"	Christian Nyby	Wilton Schiller	December 26, 1970
The officers' day begins with a liquor store robbery allegedly committed by the owner's brother that resulted in an officer being shot, later confronting the thieves in a shootout. Other calls include a zoning dispute with an elderly woman doing astrology readings out of her apartment, and a young boy asking a pharmacist questions about Seconal pills and his very uncooperative mother.
65	13	"Log 175: Con Artists"	James Neilson	Norman Katikov	January 2, 1971
The Johnson Family, a major con artist clan, is in town running their con schemes (including nonexistent roof repairs and phony wood delivery), with Malloy and Reed trying to stop them as well as having to catch two former plant security men-turned-arsonists, take a drunken married couple in when neither prove to be in any condition to drive, and handle a traffic accident which became a car fire after a flare set by a Good Samaritan rolls into a butane tank. Similar to her role as an eccentric Baldwin Sister on The Waltons, Helen Kleeb guest stars.
66	14	"Log 115: Gang War"	James Neilson	John T. Dugan	January 9, 1971
A robbery suspect eludes Reed on foot, but is found later after getting food poisoning from his haul. A priest (Trini Lopez) calls Malloy and Reed in to stop a burgeoning gang war, which succeeds at first but ends up breaking out later and resulting in one death.
67	15	"Log 26: LEMRAS"	James Neilson	William R. Cox	January 16, 1971
The LAPD introduces the LEMRAS (Law Enforcement Manpower Resource Allocation System) to assist in identifying high-crime streets, including part of Malloy and Reed's patrol area, which was used in stopping a rash of burglaries involving motorcycle-riding suspects. The officers also handle an armed robbery-turned-hostage situation and a kidnapping involving a young girl. Don "Red" Barry as Edwin M. Kale
68	16	"Log 155: I.A.D."	Christian Nyby	Michael Donovan	January 21, 1971
Malloy's life is saved by Officer Tony Johnson (Jed Allan), who stopped a forklift from killing Malloy while apprehending some robbery suspects. Johnson later reveals that he is under investigation by Internal Affairs for blackmail and wants Malloy to locate a woman named Ginger who can clear him, but Ginger's near-identical dissertation of Johnson's story makes Malloy suspicious.
69	17	"Log 66: The Vandals"	Oscar Rudolph	James Doherty	January 28, 1971
Malloy and Reed pull over a car on a traffic violation and find two escaped mental patients with a gun driving a stolen car with a dead body in the trunk. In another incident, during a traffic stop an older man gets guns drawn on him for making a sudden move similar to that of the mental patients, and he dresses down the officers. Later, the officers are called to a home where a window was broken during a toilet-papering incident by a teenaged girl's friends, who ran off and later returned to confront the girl's father, with the confrontation turning tragically violent.
70	18	"Log 36: Man Between"	James Neilson	Michael Donovan	February 4, 1971
Reed's day starts out with Reed first filing a complaint against a door-to-door salesman for illegally modifying Reed's $30 check into a $300 check and then later buying a day-old newspaper, prompting Officer Wells (Gary Crosby) to tell Reed he's "too trusting". Wells and Reed later apprehend a man fitting the description of a shooting suspect, but Wells arrests him rather than wait for the victim to confirm the identity. The suspect turns out not to be the shooter, but the victim's drunk husband is, and Sgt. MacDonald admonishes Wells for the false arrest. Other calls include two men fighting over a marijuana plant and a distraught woman running to a bank to get a ransom for her baby being held by an armed and mentally unstable man.
71	19	"Log 165: Once a Cop"	Christian Nyby	James Doherty	February 11, 1971
Malloy and Reed are on patrol, and find a homeless man stabbed. They take a retired policeman, Jack Donohoe (who lives nearby), in for questioning, but he is released when the real suspect is found. Donohoe later gets involved in a shootout with a robbery suspect. Other incidents include an aspiring actress from Missouri shooting up a phone booth at Union Station after being lured by a theatrical agent who promised a movie career and took her money, and then having her suitcase, containing a rattlesnake, stolen at the station.
72	20	"Log 76: Militants"	Christian Nyby	Michael Donovan	February 18, 1971
The officers respond to a shooting involving police and two black men, one of which was shot by one of the officers and later found dead in an alley. The dead man was the younger brother of Reed's friend Kenneth James; his older brother Cleotis was an accomplice and both were members of a black militant gang, The Brotherhood. Kenneth believes the gang's contention that Cleotis was murdered by the officers until the James brothers confront each other and Kenneth learns the truth; his brother Cleotis is arrested after briefly taking his brother hostage. Malloy and Reed also pull over an elderly driver on his 75th birthday for multiple traffic violations.
73	21	"Log 164: The Poachers"	James Neilson	John Kingsbridge	February 25, 1971
Malloy and Reed's day begins with a police garage employee taking a joyride in a police car (Code 3), later finding a young woman trying to cash an old age benefits check she found, checking a garage whose closed circuit TV security system was stolen, an elderly woman thinking she saw a prowler, finding a B&E suspect inside a coffin in a mortuary, and poaching into Officer Wells' territory to check on break-ins occurring in warehouses; finally apprehending two drugged out burglars inside a warehouse.
74	22	"Log 16: Child in Danger"	James Neilson	Robert I. Holt	March 4, 1971
Malloy has to shoot one of two robbery suspects, then the officers counsel a young woman in a bad neighborhood not to hang around (she is later kidnapped by two men claiming to fix her car), the LAPD's Air-Ten helicopter is used to catch the kidnappers (who already had outstanding kidnapping warrants), find a "mover" (burglar) whose partner hides in a freezer, and the officers visit an apartment on a domestic dispute complaint and find another woman with severe injuries but the couple insists nothing is going on, later arresting the husband on domestic violence charges after the woman's mother calls the police back to the apartment after the woman's husband beats their daughter. Susan Seaforth Hayes and John Davis Chandler guest star.
75	23	"Log 56: Vice Versa"	Christian Nyby	John T. Dugan	March 11, 1971
Malloy celebrates his birthday by having to let Reed drive 1-Adam-12 (due to Malloy allowing his driver's license to expire) and is nervous about his young partner driving the car. Calls include a bank robbery reported by the Bank robber, a burglary involving several neighbors, an abandoned baby, a suicidal wife who killed her husband on their 22nd wedding anniversary, and a drug dealer selling his wares out of an ice cream truck. Ellen Corby and Keye Luke guest star.
76	24	"Log 106: Post Time"	Christian Nyby	Stephen J. Cannell	March 18, 1971
Malloy and Reed investigate the theft of an offset press at a press shop, and later they find and apprehend the thief who was using the press to print winning bet slips at the track. Other incidents include finding an 80-year-old blind man with a rusty rifle barricaded in a condemned building (they get him to a home but he escapes and has to be returned), and a man with a fully street-legal Army tank causing concerns from citizens. Morey Amsterdam guest stars.
77	25	"Log 88: Reason to Run"	Christian Nyby	James Doherty	April 1, 1971
Retired actor Slim Berkeley has some items stolen from his horse stables; originally his assistant (played by Randolph Mantooth of Emergency! fame) who had a criminal record from New York City was suspected, but later the items were returned by the mother of the real thief, a woman (played by Linda Kaye Henning of Petticoat Junction fame) who is a client of the stable. Other calls include Reed getting physical with two men fighting in a phone booth (and getting a sore jaw for his efforts), finding a robbery suspect after a shootout, and a jewelry salesman (played by Norm Crosby) whose convertible was filled with cement by a cement driver who had mistaken ideas about his wife's intentions with the salesman.
78	26	"Log 125: Safe Job"	Jean Yarborough	William P. McGivern	April 8, 1971
Malloy and Reed investigate a series of safe jobs, which all seem to tie in with a retired safecracker (Michael O'Shea) who is taking care of his orphaned niece and nephew, and after a "tip" from him, finds the niece and nephew practicing his old tricks on another safe. The officers also investigate a woman whose baby was held hostage by her cousin (James Luisi) and forcing her to meet and steal from other men, after which the officers arrest the cousin and rescue the baby.

=== Season 4 (1971–72) ===
Changes: - Malloy is promoted to Senior Lead Officer (Police Officer III+1) and wears two chevrons with a star under them on his sleeve. MacDonald is promoted to Sergeant II and wears three chevrons plus a rocker on his sleeve. 1-Adam-12 is now a 1971 Plymouth Satellite with "012" painted on its top.

No. overall	No. in season	Title	Directed by	Written by	Original release date
79	1	"Extortion"	Christian Nyby	Robert I. Holt	September 15, 1971
Malloy and Reed investigate an extortion racket against a group of Jewish Holocaust survivors, with the owner of a dry cleaners willing to testify but others not out of fear of retribution. The officers return to handle the owner's panel truck being set ablaze and later the owner is physically assaulted. Malloy and Reed capture both suspects. Other incidents involved a robbery at a bar (the perps escaped initially, but are later captured after a shootout), and a drunk man owed back pay by a dockmaster threatens to dump his boat onto dry land from a crane unless he's paid. Bob Hastings and George O'Hanlon guest star.
80	2	"Million Dollar Buff"	James Neilson	Leo V. Gordon	September 22, 1971
Police "buff" Jennings Thornton (played by Leo Gordon, who wrote the episode), a thorn in the side for Malloy and Reed, intervenes in a drunk driving case, runs down a shooter after a robbery (and nearly getting Reed killed), and is finally arrested himself for falsely arresting two teenage boys for stealing mag wheels that were actually legally bought. Another case involves a woman who stole an expensive ring from a store, leaving a cheap one in return; the suspect is later arrested during a parking lot dispute and the ring is found on her during a search. Lindsay Wagner and Ed Begley, Jr. also guest star.
81	3	"The Grandmother"	Ozzie Nelson	Herb Purdum	September 29, 1971
Malloy and Reed investigate a robbery in a store run by a group of "grandmothers", who sell small homemade items, then later return the money. The suspect later robs an antique shop but is captured when he returns to the first store to attempt another robbery, and the officers purchase some items from the "grandmothers". Other incidents include a high-speed chase of three robbery suspects, who are captured with the help of Sgt. MacDonald, and a priest stopped for a traffic violation who wants to have a drug dealer arrested for selling him marijuana. Ozzie Nelson directed and guest starred in the episode.
82	4	"The Sniper" "The Radical"	Oscar Rudolph	Stephen J. Cannell	October 6, 1971
The radical Robin Saydo (John Davis Chandler) is on the loose, tied into a number of bombings. Reed spots him and Saydo is arrested by D.A. Paul Ryan (played by Robert Conrad). Other calls include an abandoned police cruiser which turned out to be a lone policeman on a foot pursuit capturing a drug suspect, and retired security officer Fred Tibbles (Frank Ferguson) assists the officers in breaking up a truck theft ring which took the trucks but not the merchandise within them. Note: This episode begins a crossover with The D.A. that concludes on "The People vs. Robin Saydo".
83	5	"The Search"	James Neilson	Stephen J. Cannell	October 20, 1971
1-Adam-12 is back on the streets after routine maintenance, but the radio isn't working properly. During an armed robbery involving two suspects, Reed captures one while Malloy takes off in pursuit of the other one through Griffith Park and loses control of the car, and it rolls into an embankment hidden from the road, with Malloy suffering severe internal bleeding and a broken leg. All available units are called in to search for Malloy, who has to watch helplessly while a suspect hiding in the park takes his shotgun (which Malloy was using as a splint for his leg) and sidearm, and tears off the radio microphone leaving only leaving the wires. Malloy uses the wires to send a signal for help, which Reed picks up and is able to rescue his partner.
84	6	"The Ferret"	Alan Crosland	Stephen J. Cannell	October 27, 1971
A man named "The Ferret" is vandalizing a manufacturing plant due to their poor record on ecology, and escapes Reed easily on foot pursuit. A reporter catches Reed in an unflattering light after the escape and plasters him over the front page. Reed is redeemed when he catches the Ferret when he returns later to the same plant and dumps a bucket of waste in the lobby. Other calls include a man whose pregnant wife fell into a coma after eating mud given to her by a voodoo priest, resulting in her baby boy being stillborn (when the officers confront the priest, he puts a mojo hex on Reed), and an elderly lady pulled over for a traffic violation who thinks the policemen are gas station attendants. Marvin Miller
85	7	"Truant"	Hollingsworth Morse	Michael Donovan	November 3, 1971
Truancy is on the rise in the district and Reed has a plan to pick up truants on the street, which was approved after a garage break-in by two truants. Results show a drop in crimes committed by truants, in one case two truants were stopped by the police and were implicated in a burglary, and one of the two truants involved in the garage break-in is brought in on another incident. Other incidents include arresting two heroin smugglers who hid the stash in their car's gas tank, which leaked some of the contraband making the car stall, and stop car thieves from stripping parts to build a dune buggy. Starting with this episode, Officer Ed Wells is promoted to Police Officer III (just under Malloy's rank of Police Officer III+1).
86	8	"Ambush"	Christian Nyby	Stephen J. Cannell and Herb Purdum	November 10, 1971
Malloy and Reed are sent to assist the Los Angeles County Sheriff's Department with transporting a prisoner (played by William Campbell, Trelane from Star Trek) from Malibu to Los Angeles for outstanding traffic warrants. During the trip, the prisoner reveals he is also a witness in a mob murder and a hit has been ordered on him. Suddenly, the cruiser is ambushed on a rural road, a tire is shot out, and they crash on a dirt road out of radio range. Reed is captured by hitmen attempting to get assistance, but Malloy and the prisoner steal the hitmen's car to get to a phone. The LAPD sends a police helicopter to search for Reed, who ends up overpowering the hit men and are captured.
87	9	"Anniversary"	James Neilson	Leo V. Gordon	November 17, 1971
Sgt. MacDonald's anniversary is coming up and the officers have limited funds to spend on a gift, which is a bottle of champagne, but when the officers pick it up, the owner of the liquor store (Stubby Kaye) was shot in an attempted robbery. Malloy and Reed later find the robber dead in a park from a gunshot wound inflicted by the owner. Other incidents include a paralyzed ex-wrestler tearing up a bar, a man driving suspiciously turns out to be the proud owner of several traffic tickets in a 24 hour period, used car dealer George Moore (Robert Emhardt) trying to take advantage of Mexican customer Rudolfo Diaz (Pedro Gonzalez Gonzalez) who speaks little English, and two camper thieves pushing a truck with a camper that is too small for the truck bed.
88	10	"Day Watch"	Dennis Donnelly	Leo V. Gordon	November 24, 1971
Over the course of their shift, Malloy and Reed deal with a racist gas station owner who is tired of being the victim of repeated robberies. When they catch the suspect, supposedly a black man, they find he is actually just an equally-racist white man in blackface. Other calls include a hitchhiker who extorts money from drivers she leaves in embarrassing situations, and a drunk who is seeing pink elephants.
89	11	"Assassination"	Christian Nyby	Michael Donovan	December 8, 1971
A phony prowler call results in shots being fired at Malloy and Reed. Shots ring out again when the officers head to the airport to transport a blood donor (played by Angela Cartwright of Lost in Space fame). The suspect is a known check bouncer, and Reed's wife gets a disturbing phone call. Later Reed heads home and meets an acquaintance who just happens to be driving the same car as the shooting suspect. Other cases include a suicidal man who tries to incinerate himself with gasoline, and a wino who is nearly shot by Reed.
90	12	"The Dinosaur"	Ozzie Nelson	Michael Donovan	December 15, 1971
Officer Art McCall (played by Warren Stevens) returns from eight years on disability and rides with Malloy and Reed to see how much has changed in law enforcement. McCall soon learns exactly how much has changed when he tries illegal techniques to help a young woman with her ex-con husband, fails to Mirandize a boy after arresting him for robbery, and screws up an arrest of a gun-carrying man who later plants a bomb in his ex-wife's car, which requires Malloy to dress down the veteran officer on his use of antiquated (and illegal) police procedures. Heather North (the voice of Daphne in the Scooby-Doo cartoons) also guest stars.
91	13	"Pick-Up"	James Neilson	J. C. Hospidar	December 29, 1971
Malloy and Reed find a girl who was raped and left for dead in the hills but was actually alive and identified her attacker's car as a red Porsche. Malloy spots the suspect car picking up another girl and gives chase, only to have the suspect dump the girl on the street and the officer loses the car. Later the girl's mother finds drugs in the laundry and determine she was selling and the "rapist" was her supplier, while the real rapist is caught when he checked out of the hospital after being hit by his victim's heavy purse. The officers also handle a robbery at a construction yard foiled by police scouts. Barbara Hale (Perry Mason) and Kathy Garver (Family Affair) guest star.
92	14	"Citizens All"	James Neilson	Leo V. Gordon	January 5, 1972
Cases include a woman whose purse was robbed after two men bumped her car while on the road, a supposedly broken-down car leading to a meeting between the car's owner and a counterfeiter, a fight in a fast-food restaurant resulting in an arrest of one of the combatants on outstanding warrants, and a citizen's complaint about loud noise from a neighbor's house. Later, a follow-up on the noise complaint leads to the capture of the purse thieves, who are trying to rob the house's owner.
93	15	"The Princess and the Pig"	James Neilson	Stephen J. Cannell	January 12, 1972
A disturbance call leads the officers to a nightclub where a singer named Kathy (played by Leslie Charleson of General Hospital fame) is strung out on drugs, and clings to Reed on the way to the hospital, telling him someone is trying to kill her and give her drugs. Narcotic detectives decide to assign Reed undercover as an AWOL soldier with a large stash of heroin to sell. Reed makes a deal, but Kathy blows his cover, and Malloy saves his partner from being killed and helps bring down the dealers.
94	16	"The Tip"	Christian Nyby	Michael Donovan	January 19, 1972
Malloy and Reed deal with a woman (guest star Rose Marie) who thinks she has a rattlesnake in her luggage, an out-of-town traffic violator, and a bar brawl, all while tackling armored truck robbers whose attacks have been predicted in advance by an informant.
95	17	"The Parole Violator"	James Neilson	Don Page	January 26, 1972
Malloy doesn't believe that the best player on the rec-league basketball team he coaches is back on drugs, even in the face of evidence that suggests otherwise. Meanwhile on their beat, Malloy and Reed must find a hit-and-run driver who struck a child, and pull over a traffic violator whose passenger is belligerent (and wanted).
96	18	"Adoption"	Christian Nyby	Leonard F. Hill	February 2, 1972
Malloy and Reed investigate when a college football locker room is ransacked, and uncover systematic use of performance-enhancing drugs. They also investigate parents who dispute their maid's report that their baby is missing, arrest a prowler who is suspiciously allowed into a home by his female accuser, and get involved in a high-speed chase that resulted from a domestic disturbance. Jackie Coogan guest stars as a football trainer.
97	19	"Mary Hong Loves Tommy Chen"	James Neilson	Stephen J. Cannell	February 9, 1972
A young girl from Chinatown is ordered by her father to withhold information from Malloy and Reed regarding her boyfriend, an undercover cop left in a coma after investigating a potential attack on a Chinese elders' association. Meanwhile, the officers also encounter a middle-aged marijuana user and a cross-dressing criminal who leads them to a counterfeit money ring while trying to pay his lawyer. Foster Brooks, Keye Luke, and Jo Anne Worley guest star.
98	20	"Sub-Station"	Christian Nyby	Michael Donovan	February 16, 1972
Malloy and Reed are temporarily assigned to a police sub-station at LAX. While there, they deal with a hostage situation between a flight attendant and a man desperate for the attention of a television producer, go undercover to intercept a drug shipment from Toledo, Ohio, and prevent a rape suspect from escaping on an outbound flight. Frank Sinatra, Jr. guest-stars as the hostage-taker.
99	21	"Backup 1L-20"	James Neilson	Stephen J. Cannell	February 23, 1972
Malloy tries to prove Sgt. MacDonald's innocence when he accidentally hits and kills a jaywalker while driving his police cruiser. Every witness on the sidewalk claims she was in the crosswalk, and the burglary suspect MacDonald is transporting is unmotivated to testify on his behalf. The truth proves to be far more complicated than the officers realized.
100	22	"Who Won?"	James Neilson	Michael Donovan	March 1, 1972
Malloy and Reed work to curtail the rise in illegal street racing by working with the leaders of rival racing clubs and obtaining the legitimate use of a dragstrip through a race promoter. Their work is threatened, along with an anticipated race between Reed and Officer Wells (Gary Crosby), when one of the racers resorts to sabotage. Dick Clark guest stars as the race promoter.
101	23	"Eyewitness"	Christian Nyby	James Doherty	March 8, 1972
Malloy and Reed are searching for a missing six-year-old boy and they believe an elderly witness' inaccurate account may actually be for a different crime. They also respond to a suspicious dog complaint, a domestic dispute over a husband's desire to watch football, a college prank, and search the Travel Town railroad museum with a police helicopter for fleeing robbery suspects. Norm Crosby as Charlie
102	24	"The Wednesday Warrior"	James Neilson	Stephen J. Cannell	March 15, 1972
Reed is worried when his friend, Steven Franken as electrical engineer Albert Porter is made a reserve police officer and ends up being partnered with Officer Ed Wells. Malloy and Reed have to contend with illegal campers, a couple driving a stolen car, and help Wells and his new partner chase down a heavily armed bank robber who forces innocent people to participate in his crimes.

=== Season 5 (1972–73) ===
Changes: 1-Adam-12 is now a 1972 AMC Matador and will remain their police cruiser for the remainder of the series.

No. overall	No. in season	Title	Directed by	Written by	Original release date
103	1	"Dirt Duel"	Carl Barth	Michael Donovan	September 13, 1972
A series of purse snatchings involving motorcyclists frustrates the LAPD, as they cannot follow them down the off-road trails they take. Reed holds a community meeting with the various motorcycle clubs, and the leader of one club challenges Malloy to a dirt bike race. Reed teaches Malloy how to ride a dirt bike, and while Malloy loses the race, he gains the respect of the club's leader, who helps them apprehend the suspects by blocking their escape route. Edd Byrnes and Micky Dolenz guest star.
104	2	"The Late Baby"	Lawrence Dobkin	Stephen J. Cannell	September 20, 1972
Malloy goes on a date with Officer Wells' niece and learns just how over-protective her uncle is. Calls include a prowler in a heavily wooded neighborhood, a flower vendor with a stack of unpaid tickets, a check on a suspicious gardener, and a high-speed pursuit with a green Corvette leading to it crashing later on. Tina Sinatra and Frank Sinatra, Jr. guest star.
105	3	"Airdrop"	Dennis Donnelly	Leo V. Gordon	September 27, 1972
Malloy and Reed are patrolling the outskirts of Los Angeles when a girl on horseback alerts them to a small plane that landed in a secluded area. When the officers investigate, they see a pickup truck fleeing and the plane trying to take off; though they stop the plane, they have no proof the pilot did anything. Malloy and Reed later learn from the DEA that a Mexican cartel is behind the landings, with the pilot instructed to play dumb if caught. The officers find the pilot and trace the pickup truck's location, and the truck is followed to the landing site, where the smuggler and the pilot are arrested.
106	4	"Lost and Found"	Dennis Donnelly	Michael Donovan	October 4, 1972
In a crossover episode with the cast of Emergency!, Malloy and Reed rush a diabetic eight-year-old boy to Rampart Hospital, but he runs away from the hospital and must be found before he goes into a diabetic coma. Malloy and Reed find him at a pet store where his parents were buying him a new puppy before his original attack. Meanwhile, Malloy's girlfriend Cathy is manning a soon-to-be extinct crisis hotline when she gets a call from Sherry, a teenager who is threatening suicide by overdosing on her mother's drugs, and Malloy and Reed have to find her. Emergency! stars Robert Fuller, Julie London, Bobby Troup, Randolph Mantooth, and Kevin Tighe appear as side characters and in cameos; Deidre Hall guest stars.
107	5	"Training Wheels"	Paul Landres	Michael Donovan	October 11, 1972
The officers undergo driver refresher courses to hone their pursuit and driving skills, leading to Reed attempting to drive the cruiser. Incidents include the officers going undercover as paperboys riding bicycles to find car strippers, Wells wrecks his bicycle that belonged to a young girl, Malloy dealing with an irate newspaper customer, and Reed and Malloy stopping a van where the driver's crested myna keeps chanting "Down with the Pigs!".
108	6	"Badge Heavy"	Robert Leeds	Stephen J. Cannell	October 25, 1972
Officer Charlie Burnside pulls a prank on Officer Albert Porter, a friend of Reed's. Porter, who does not find the prank funny, informs Reed that Burnside is frequently "badge-heavy" (rough) with his suspects. After dealing with an inept would-be robber, Malloy and Reed observe Burnside choking a suspect. Reed reports the incident, but nothing is done by the Captain because the victim would not admit Burnside was the aggressor. Burnside turns cocky on Reed saying he has "an ace in the hole" and that Reed was mad about the prank he pulled on Porter, but it is later revealed that Burnside got to one of the robbers, placing him under investigation. At the end of watch, Burnside tries intimidating Reed, then tries brushing his intimidation off as a joke when he realizes the other officers are against him; when they all walk out, Burnside resigns.
109	7	"Harry Nobody"	Sam Freedle	Jeffrey Lewis	November 8, 1972
Harry, a hotel janitor, witnesses a murder in a hotel room, but refuses to talk until Reed shows him compassion and respect, both of which are lacking from his family and friends, but his testimony is clouded by his alcoholic past. Meanwhile, Malloy relives his childhood by telling the story of him chaperoning a junior high dance.
110	8	"The Surprise"	Dennis Donnelly	Stephen J. Cannell	November 15, 1972
During Malloy's birthday, he lets Reed know he does not enjoy surprise parties, but becomes increasingly suspicious and believes the others are actually planning a surprise party, much to his chagrin; it is soon revealed that is not the case. Meanwhile, Sgt. MacDonald warns the officers about a rash of robberies using milk crates to break store windows; during a routine traffic stop, Reed notices a milk crate in the back of a car and surreptitiously marks it for identification later, and the thief is apprehended later using the same milk crate. Calls include a backup call for a jewelry store robbery when the officers pull over the owner of said store for DUI, an embarrassed male purse snatching victim inside a negligee shop, a phony gas station worker at a closed gas station, a shootout in the police garage between the entire station and a drunk suspect officers failed to handcuff, and Officer Wells capturing a B&E suspect based on a hunch by Malloy.
111	9	"Vendetta"	Sam Freedle	Leo V. Gordon	November 22, 1972
A World War II survivor and tailor shop owner sets an ambush for an unidentified intruder when Malloy and Reed intervene. R&I determines the owner is clean and emigrated to the U.S. seventeen years earlier from Eastern Europe. The officers speak with a local priest who knows the owner, who complains to Sgt. MacDonald about what he feels is the officers' interference. Later, shots are fired at the shop, and the officers find a wounded intruder with no one else in the shop. Malloy and Reed find the owner with the priest, who informs them that the intruder is a former Nazi soldier who killed his relative during the war. Nehemiah Persoff guest stars.
112	10	"The Chaser"	Dennis Donnelly	Leo V. Gordon	December 6, 1972
Malloy and Reed encounter an armed private investigator from out of state, who is in Los Angeles to find a bail jumper. Later the PI is in the middle of an altercation with two black men, one of which is injured; the PI claims the men tried to rob him, but the men tell a different story, and Sgt. MacDonald orders the PI arrested. The PI is found roughing up the bail jumper and is arrested. Calls include an elderly man wanting a group of cars driven by hippies ticketed for illegal parking, and a woman who demands the officers ticket her husband's car because he refuses to replace the balding tires on it.
113	11	"Hot Spell"	Lawrence Doheny	Leo V. Gordon	December 13, 1972
Malloy and Reed have to wear their long-sleeved uniforms despite a hot forecast, then learn they could have changed to short sleeves but missed the radio notification. Calls include the search for a bicycle pump that contains drugs, a woman experiencing withdrawal symptoms with the dealer and the pump up the street, a man complaining about his grass being trampled during his neighbor's yard sale (which had stolen property taken by the neighbor "on consignment") leads to the discovery of the burglar, who then provides a tip on a murder suspect (Leo Gordon, who wrote the episode) that leads to his arrest. Scatman Crothers guest stars.
114	12	"Gifts and Long Letters"	Harry Harris	Don Rico	December 20, 1972
Malloy and Reed are called to a hotel to stop a woman's suicide attempt; while there, they learn of a parolee there who refuses to speak with the woman because he thinks someone from the mob is after him. Later the officers are called back to the hotel because the manager wants the parolee evicted; another call to the hotel leads to shots fired from the parolee, who was having delusions the mob was after him. In another case, the officers offer assistance to a man whose extremely damaged car simply needed a tire change; the man and his car are later the suspects in a robbery, and detectives arrest the man with the officers' help.
115	13	"O'Brien's Stand"	Lawrence Doheny	Jeffrey Lewis	January 3, 1973
Malloy's old landlady, Mrs. O'Brien, has her purse stolen and refuses to leave the station until her case is settled. Mrs. O'Brien resorts to other means, including hounding detectives and setting up a picket line to vent her frustrations. Malloy makes connection between her theft and a string of purse snatchings involving social security checks, and a decoy leads to the end of the theft ring. Calls include two suspicious men and a pursuit involving them, and a homicide where candy wrappers and tire tracks from the pursuit suspects are found.
116	14	"Clear with a Civilian"	Dennis Donnelly	Stephen J. Cannell	January 10, 1973
117	15	"Clear with a Civilian"	Dennis Donnelly	Stephen J. Cannell	January 17, 1973
Part 1: Reed spreads his flu to several other officers, leaving the station undermanned. Calls include a shootout with a rifle-toting bookie, an argument between a storekeeper and a customer over a cantaloupe during an unrelated traffic stop, Reed locating a burglar after seeing a flashlight inside a store, and a teenager evading Reed in a foot pursuit. Due to the understaffing situation, Malloy and Reed are asked to do double shifts, and Malloy tickets a woman (Juanita Moore) for turning right at a red without stopping. Later, Sgt. MacDonald assigns them to drive around a police commissioner for the night; the commissioner is actually the woman Malloy ticketed. Part 2: While on their second night shift, Malloy and Reed take Police Commissioner Dixon on a ride-along. Calls include a drunk and naked elderly man in a bar, a fight between a gang, and a missing 17-year-old deaf boy with mental instabilities, which Reed recognizes as the boy that escaped his foot pursuit earlier. Burt Mustin and Rose Marie guest star.
118	16	"Citizen's Arrest – 484"	Sam Freedle	Robert I. Holt	January 24, 1973
Malloy and Reed arrest a seemingly less-fortunate woman for shoplifting items for her baby, but she escapes from custody during a disruption at the station; the officers later learn the woman and her husband actually stole the baby, as they could not have one of their own. After finding the woman at a landlord-tenant dispute, they learn the woman's husband stole his car, and that the manager supposedly made an extortion call demanding $2,000 for the baby. The officers pursue and eventually catch the husband at a rail yard. Another call results in Reed briefly being held at gunpoint by a burglary suspect; Reed manages to trick the suspect and signal Malloy for help.
119	17	"The Beast"	Robert M. Leeds	Kenneth Johnson	January 31, 1973
Malloy and Reed are given an older cruiser with 300 miles to go until retirement. They quickly learn the car is extremely unreliable and barely works: the accelerator surges, the glove compartment door constantly drops on Reed's knees, the water hose breaks while they are sneaking up on a prowler suspect (actually just a man who once lived there), their malfunctioning taillights prevent them from writing a ticket to a citizen whose car had the same problem, the distributor cap fails when trying to respond to another call, and finally, after capturing a pursuit suspect, the car's brakes fail and the unmanned car totals itself on a light pole. Another call regarding a truck loading up at a warehouse leads to the arrest of a large group of organized burglars after Malloy notices a slight discrepancy in their otherwise foolproof plan. Marty Ingels and Donna Douglas guest star.
120	18	"Killing Ground"	Lawrence Doheny	Stephen J. Cannell	February 7, 1973
Malloy and Reed pull over a camper van on a routine traffic stop. Delayed from informing dispatch by a lengthy robbery transmission, they are kidnapped by two robbers escaping from the aforementioned robbery. Later accompanied by the girlfriend of the third dead robber, the officers use the trio's shaky relationship to escape and apprehend the suspects, and the sheriff's department rescues them.
121	19	"Nightwatch"	Dennis Donnelly	Leo V. Gordon	February 14, 1973
Reed considers buying a used car, only to learn it was eventually purchased by someone else. Calls include a possible DUI where the driver passes the field sobriety tests, a shooting where a man kills his recently paroled son-in-law, a car stripper, a man is stopped for speeding and over $900 in unpaid tickets, and two beatings at motels.
122	20	"Suspended"	Sam Freedle	Leonard F. Hill	February 21, 1973
Reed spends an evening on the firing range, then stops by an all-night grocery store. When Reed leaves, a man approaches him as if he knew him, then points out another man in a green Beetle holding a gun on the officer. Reed drops his groceries, shoves the man, jumps and fires at the Beetle driver, hitting the car, but the man in the Beetle shoots his accomplice. The grocer swears he only heard one shot, and the accomplice gives a dying declaration that Reed was trigger-happy and shot him, leading to Reed's suspension. Malloy and his by-the-book replacement partner locate the green Beetle (now yellow) after going through numerous DMV checks and locate the other man, exonerating Reed. Shaaron Claridge, the series' recurring female dispatcher, makes her only on-screen appearance in this episode.
123	21	"A Fool and His Money"	Sam Freedle	Richard Marris	February 28, 1973
Malloy wins $10,000 in a women's shampoo naming contest and intends to buy a boat despite the rest of the squad suggesting he find other uses for it. Calls include a tenant complaining that another tenant's phonograph music is too loud, a sniper on a parking garage who is shot trying to escape in a car, a reported theft that turns out to be a broke man whose three wives stripped his house of everything except the reported items, and a homeless man's homicide over his new tennis shoes.
124	22	"Anatomy of a 415"	Dennis Donnelly	Jeff Kanter	March 7, 1973
Malloy and Reed spot a runaway young boy hiding in the woods and prepare to take him home, then respond to his address for a disturbance and find his mother and step-father quiet. They return a second time with the couple throwing things at each other and break it up. A third call to the same address forces the officers to send the husband to his sister's house, but he returns to the apartment and when he does, shots ring out just as the officers arrive for the fourth time. Calls include a motorist encountering a girl who offers him drugs, a man trying to break into his own truck after his dog locked him out, and a drunk bicycle thief.
125	23	"Keeping Tabs"	Lawrence Doheny	Kenneth Johnson	March 14, 1973
Malloy and Reed pull over a speeding car full of joyriding teenagers, including Sgt. MacDonald's son, and Malloy finds himself in the middle between father and son on how to handle it. Calls include a burglar who tries to run up the fire escape unsuccessfully, complaints about a woman feeding ducks interrupting two men and a chess game, two men in a knife fight over a woman who leaves with a third man after the two are arrested, and a drunk trying to direct traffic at a busy intersection. Pat Buttram guest stars.
126	24	"Easy Rap"	Dennis Donnelly	Michael Donovan	March 21, 1973
Reed loses a case against a young car thief in juvenile court, who is later spotted in his dad's car. Later, a robbery leads to a high-speed pursuit which ends in a car accident; the teen car thief is killed in the crash. Calls include a girl (whose boyfriend died from a heroin "hot shot") helping the officers take down his supplier, and an elderly woman insisting on being arrested rather than ticketed for a traffic violation.

=== Season 6 (1973–74) ===
No. overall	No. in season	Title	Directed by	Written by	Original release date
127	1	"Harbor Division"	Dennis Donnelly	Bryan K. Joseph	September 12, 1973
Malloy has to sell two ballet tickets after his date cancels on him. Calls include a boat owner who was overcharged for fuel by a dealer, a driver with a suspicious box on top of his car, a suspicious young couple, a recklessly-driving astrologer, and a drunk cook shooting from the crows nest of a ship. Jayne Meadows guest stars.
128	2	"Rampart Division: The Senior Citizens"	Lawrence Doheny	David H. Vowell	September 19, 1973
Malloy and Reed patrol a neighborhood of Los Angeles inhabited by a large retired population. Calls include a purse snatching during which the suspect eluded capture, but was later found during routine patrol, an elderly man with multiple warrants for auto theft trying to break into a car in a church parking lot, a dispute between an elderly woman and man over her eviction and his offer to take her in (the woman is later arrested when she begins smashing 1-Adam-12's windshield with a baseball bat), a dispute over $5, a baby stroller rolling into a lake, and a retired policeman-turned-security guard named George who wants to talk shop, then assists in the suspects' arrest after a robbery, afterwards laments to the officers about being lonely due to all of his friends passing on.
129	3	"Foothill Division"	Christian I. Nyby II	Leo V. Gordon	September 26, 1973
Sgt. MacDonald reports his camper was broken into, with three fishing rods and a pair of custom-made cowboy boots missing, and offers two free steak dinners for their return. The officers come across an off-duty sheriff's deputy with the same "one of a kind" boots that Mac lost, but do not find any of MacDonald's belongings. Cases include Malloy, Reed, and Mac riding horseback to locate three suspects in a break-in at a stable, Rampart Police Station going under sniper fire, and Officer Wells attempting to be compassionate by taking up a collection for a couple and their cancer-stricken daughter to get to San Francisco, only to learn the couple are well-known con artists with a long rap sheet.
130	4	"West Valley Division"	Christian I. Nyby II	Alf Harris	October 3, 1973
Malloy and Reed notice an attractive woman walking her Scottish Terrier, only to learn she is actually a burglar using the dog to cover her exit. Calls include assisting Air-10 to track down a teenager riding a dirt bike in a fire hazard area (then a citizen complaining about Air-10's presence), robbery at a movie theater by a man on a gray motorcycle, and a robbery at a department store that results in the death of a security guard leading to the pursuit of a completely unrelated thrill-seeking couple in a car similar to the robbery suspects'.
131	5	"Venice Division"	Lawrence Doheny	Robert I. Holt	October 10, 1973
A leotard-wearing woman calls Malloy and Reed to her apartment for help with a stalker repeatedly calling her, only for her to get viciously assaulted when he breaks into her apartment. Calls include a woman nude sunbathing on the beach with her "agent" begging for her arrest for publicity, a man trying to steal coins from a phone booth, a motorcycle officer pursuing a dune buggy, a drunk that dies in the patio of a bar with an inconsiderate owner, and a low-speed pursuit of a jack-o-lantern. Larry Hovis and Laurette Spang guest star.
132	6	"Hot Shot"	Christian I. Nyby II	Leo V. Gordon	October 24, 1973
Reed and Malloy stop a convertible on a traffic violation and find the driver is Reno West, a cat burglar Malloy sent to prison four years earlier. Malloy is suspicious that West will resume his career, as he is found later at the library looking up likely articles to steal while investigating stolen books. Calls include the removal of an abandoned car, a robbery-turned-chase-turned-standoff after a shopowner is killed by a young suspect, and a hostage situation involving a distraught man, his daughter, and a television. Lurene Tuttle appears as librarian Iris Kelly.
133	7	"Van Nuys Division: Pete's Mustache"	Dennis Donnelly	Leo V. Gordon	October 31, 1973
Malloy returns from vacation with a mustache that becomes the topic of conversation for many, only for no one to notice when he shaves it off. Calls include Adam-12 and Air Ten locating an airplane operated by a drunk pilot which crash-landed, Reno West being suspected in the theft of rare stamps from a mansion, a witness who provides excellent descriptions of suspects involved in a jewelry store robbery, a woman dragging a purse snatcher to the police station with his arm stuck in the window, and a woman with $36,000 in cash who is detained in a department store as a shoplifting suspect.
134	8	"Training Division: The Rookie"	Kenneth Johnson	Michael Donovan	November 7, 1973
After a reenaction of a fatal traffic stop is conducted for a group of probationary officers, Malloy, Reed, and Wells keep an eye on Officer George Barrett, an arrogant probationary officer who refuses to act against suspects and does not listen to superiors. He later bungles a bank robbery allegedly committed by an elderly man, and almost botches a bomb threat at a grocery store where the bomber takes another man "hostage"; in both instances, he freezes up when told to arrest seemingly "harmless" suspects, and is eventually fired.
135	9	"Capture"	Lawrence Doheny	Leo V. Gordon	November 14, 1973
Reno West's burglary reign continues. Malloy and Reed find him at a gas station with a female companion and learn he knows he is being investigated and watched. Later, West's friend's car is spotted at the scene of another burglary, and he is captured while fleeing the scene. Calls include a vicious guard dog "protecting" an elderly man in a diabetic coma, the theft of a rare jade statue from a mansion (committed by West), and a domestic dispute between a couple where it appears the wife is the abuser. Lyle Talbot, Jed Allan, Maidie Norman, Robert Montgomery guest stars
136	10	"Hollywood Division"	Dennis Donnelly	Preston Wood	November 21, 1973
Malloy really likes the voice of the new dispatcher (not Shaaron Claridge, who does not appear in this episode), but when he meets her in person he is dismayed to find she is married to a SWAT lieutenant. Calls handled include a hit-and-run which seriously injured a young girl, a synagogue who had their Hebrew-based typewriter and money stolen, a drunk woman sitting on a lawn who is spurned by her daughter when the officers take the drunk there, a disgruntled former movie studio painter who shoots his former colleagues at a movie set; the SWAT team (including the SWAT lieutenant married to the new dispatcher) is brought in to rescue the injured painters and capture the shooter.
137	11	"Northwest Division"	Dennis Donnelly	Edward J. Lakso	December 5, 1973
Reed needs his TV repaired, and brings in his Boy Scout neighbor with a merit badge in electronics to work on it, but the squad is skeptical he can fix it. Though it is later revealed he fixed most of it but called a TV repairman to finish the rest, Reed opts to give the boy full credit. Calls involve a juvenile on a souped-up minibike, a woman whom a neighbor thought had killed her husband after overhearing an argument and the woman digging in the backyard, only to find she was burying a dead chicken, a robbery committed by a long haired woman in high heels whom Reed spots at a bus stop with shorter hair and no heels, a vegan protest at a store resolved when the leader and the store manager recognize each other from a computer date, and a report made on a robbery turned out to be made by the actual robbers. Johnny Whitaker and Ronnie Schell guest star. Andrew Milner, Martin Milner's son, played Johnny Whitaker's stunt double in the minibike pursuit sequence.
138	12	"If the Shoe Fits"	Lawrence Doheny	Jim Carlson	December 12, 1973
Reed's shoes are being fixed and the replacements have an extremely annoying squeak. When he returns to the shop to pick up his old shoes, he notices a bank robbery which turns into a hostage situation. Malloy "gives in" by providing a car with the doors locked, and the robbers are apprehended. Calls include a B&E that was actually a husband destroying his furniture due to his wife leaving him and the country, a van pulled over for no brake lights and a driver with a negative attitude towards police, and Sgt. MacDonald sending the officers to a demolition site where a visually impaired boy is hiding on an elevated pipe.
139	13	"Southwest Division"	Lawrence Doheny	Edward J. Lakso	December 19, 1973
Reed and Malloy respond to a dispute in a park, where elderly woman Edna Digby (Lillian Bronson) tries to stop painter Andre Pochek (Peter Brocco) from selling a painting that she considers indecent. To resolve the issue (due to the seller needing a new permit and being short on money) Malloy buys the painting and puts it in the back of the cruiser. It becomes a frequent topic of discussion despite Malloy's dislike for the painting, and when Malloy tries to sell it to another officer, the officer only buys the frame, leaving him with the painting. Calls include a man trying to retrieve a valuable coin from a toy dispenser, a potential "peeping tom" who is actually a city employee using a telescope to check meters to avoid dogs, a repo man trying to widen a door in a house he is trying to repossess furniture from, and an ex-football star-turned-robber who flees into the Los Angeles Memorial Coliseum.
140	14	"The Sweet Smell..."	Dennis Donnelly	Jim Carlson	January 9, 1974
Malloy and Officer Woods return from a day of fishing. After a superstitious old woman spills perfume in the back seat, the entire car begins to smell like fish, an issue Malloy and Reed eventually get used to. Calls include a mute woman informing the officers a burglar had broken into a church (actually just a pastor seeking to put the church money in the bank), a kidnapping call that turns out to be a man picking up an abusive drunk woman's daughter to take her to his home, and a young boy whose bike was stolen outside an arcade.
141	15	"Trouble in the Bank"	Dennis Donnelly	Jerry Thomas	January 15, 1974
While on patrol, Reed stops into a bank to make a loan payment, only to walk into an armed robbery committed by a pair of criminals with nothing to lose. After the robbers threaten to start executing hostages starting with Reed, Mac seemingly allows them to leave the bank in a getaway car, only for Malloy to spring out of the trunk with a shotgun before they can kill Reed.
142	16	"North Hollywood Division"	Lawrence Doheny	Leonard B. Kaufman	January 22, 1974
Reed is assigned to write an article about Malloy for the LAPD Beat magazine, but is having trouble with the content. Calls include a gas station "robbery", a domestic dispute involving a barking poodle, a woman who tries to get her husband arrested, and a pursuit with a liquor store robber that ends with the suspect barricading himself in a garage.
143	17	"Taking It Easy"	Dennis Donnelly	Robert Schlitt	January 29, 1974
Reed, suffering from a wrist injury, works the front desk of the Rampart Police Station, while Malloy patrols with a rookie. Calls include a bomb threat to the station, a man attempting to report possible excessive force from an officer, an elderly man bringing a shotgun to the station, Malloy bringing in a group of abandoned children, an officer accidentally discharging his shotgun while attempting to clear a jam, and a vehicle pursuit that ends in the station parking lot.
144	18	"Krash"	Lawrence Doheny	C. W. Noel	February 5, 1974
Malloy gets a new car, and Reed gets to drive it, but the car is damaged while the officers chase and capture a purse snatcher on their way to work. Sgt. MacDonald refers Malloy to his brother's autobody shop for repairs, with Malloy concerned about the cost (which turned out to be $20). Calls include a drunk man shooting arrows, a store robbery that leads to the owner dying of a heart attack before he can describe the suspect, and a robbery at a pharmacy where the suspect flees in the back of a truck.
145	19	"Routine Patrol: The Drug Store Cowboys"	Hollingsworth Morse	Leo V. Gordon	February 12, 1974
Patrol begins with a drunk woman threatening a group of bar patrons with a gun, an investigation into the suspicious death of a mentally impaired man, and a group of carjackers who capture a cache of guns and go on a robbery spree.
146	20	"Sunburn"	Dennis Donnelly	Bryan K. Joseph	February 19, 1974
Reed returns from an off-day with an uncomfortable full-body sunburn, which causes him problems throughout the watch. Calls include a traffic accident, the arrest of a drug dealer working out of abandoned homes, the search for a robbery suspect based on a vehicle description, and the rescue of two boys from Echo Park when their boat capsizes.
147	21	"Skywatch"	Dennis Donnelly	Leo V. Gordon	February 26, 1974
148	22	"Skywatch"	Dennis Donnelly	Leo V. Gordon	March 5, 1974
Part 1: Malloy and Reed are chosen for an LAPD program where patrol officers ride along with the Air Support Division. Malloy and Reed fly with Air Seventy and Air Ten. Calls include two robbery suspects inside a high-rise building, a fleeing murder suspect, and a hijacked light plane. William Stevens reprises his role as Officer Walters, who appeared in several episodes of the first season. Part 2: Malloy and Reed take to separate helicopter units to continue their ride along. Calls include a stolen light plane from LAX by a distraught man, two robbery suspects fleeing in separate cars, and a nighttime house fire. William Stevens reprises his role as Officer Walters.
149	23	"L.A. International"	Christian I. Nyby II	Walter Black	March 12, 1974
Malloy, Reed, and Officer Woods are assigned airport duty at LAX, now equipped with closed-circuit cameras. Calls include the cameras catching a burglary from a car, an argument over a suitcase containing drugs, a fight between a soldier and another man over $300 in Japanese yen, a man using different credit cards to buy tickets, a runaway boy being brought back from Chicago, and a silent alarm at a toll gate resulting in the capture of a robber Tina Cole guest stars.
150	24	"Clinic on Eighteenth Street"	Jack Webb	Joseph Calvelli	March 19, 1974
Malloy and Reed investigate the death of an old man wearing an unusual belt, which leads to the case being turned over to Frauds Division, who finds that Dr. Gantman, running a clinic, is treating a blind seven-year-old patient with a tumor on the pituitary gland condition but his "treatment" is worthless and preventing a real treatment (removal of the tumor). Later, a TV repairman who makes oscillator belts for Gantman is busted for bookmaking and agrees to testify against the doctor, but Gantman demonstrates his "treatment" in open court and fails miserably. Ed Nelson, Frank Sinatra, Jr., Dick Haymes, and Sharon Gless guest star. This episode, in which Reed and Malloy appear only briefly, was intended to be the pilot for a new Mark VII series focusing on the Los Angeles District Attorney's Office (similar to his earlier series, The D.A., but focusing on consumer crimes), and was directed by Webb himself. However, no such series came to be.

=== Season 7 (1974–75) ===
Changes: Malloy now has two silver stripes on his lower left sleeve, indicating 10 years with the LAPD.
Sgt. MacDonald now has three silver stripes on his lower left sleeve, indicating 15 years with the LAPD.
The station sets have been downsized; the roll call room and watch commander's office have been removed and MacDonald, Malloy and Reed now work in a single office called "Team-12".

No. overall	No. in season	Title	Directed by	Written by	Original release date
151	1	"Camp"	Dennis Donnelly	Arnold Somkin	September 24, 1974
152	2	"Camp"	Dennis Donnelly	Arnold Somkin	October 1, 1974
Part 1: A young boy, Greg Whitney, is arrested for a burglary attempt and is released to his mother's custody. However, it is later determined that Whitney had a record under another name and the man he was with was posing to be his father. After Whitney is arrested for fleeing a robbery he actually did not commit, Malloy takes him to a special police-sponsored camp for troubled youth. Other cases include the attempted robbery of a taxicab, and an accident involving an elderly man and a long-haired motorcycle rider. June Lockhart guest-stars. Part 2: Malloy goes to camp with Greg Whitney and a group of other boys, and due to his short height is told to bunk with the younger boys. Greg gets into trouble right away, accused of stealing ice cream and a watch from one of the other boys, but runs off before it was determined the watch was misplaced, and is found. Olympic gold-medalist pole vaulter Bob Seagren stops by to coach the boys on a cross-country race, which Greg wins, while Reed speaks with his mother (June Lockhart) about handling Greg in the future. Back on patrol, Reed and Officer Wells deal with a woman whose alleged attacker fainted when he discovered she had a python under her coat.
153	3	"Team Work"	Lawrence Doheny	Jerry Thomas	October 8, 1974
Malloy and Reed are assigned to "team policing": officers from different departments working together as one unit. The team assists in a routine security check of a home, where they find a demeaning police caricature in the bedroom of a young Neighborhood Watch member, who is later rescued when a burglar is caught by plainclothes officers. Other calls include an accident with a suspicious female witness who gave an attorney's number to call and is later arrested after being at the scene of another accident, and a hot dog stand owner with a complaint of illegal parking.
154	4	"Roll Call"	Norman Abbott	Walter Dallenbach	October 22, 1974
An officer needs help but does not know their name, code, or location. Malloy and Reed assist in the search while the dispatcher does an emergency roll call. The missing officer is determined to be Motor Officer Grant, who is negotiating with a gunman holding a hostage in a parking garage. Grant is assisted by the officers and the suspect is captured. Other calls include an armed robbery at a bar, and Reed going undercover to nab a gunman in a pizza delivery scam.
155	5	"Suspect Number One"	Hollingsworth Morse	Leo V. Gordon	October 29, 1974
Charlie Bishop, an ex-con that Malloy previously arrested, is having problems adjusting to life after prison, and wants to be re-arrested so he can retire to a federal penitentiary. Malloy tries to get Charlie into a halfway house instead, but the ex-con is not deterred, and his efforts nearly succeed when he is involved in a robbery. Other calls include a home burglary that becomes an arrest of a tax cheat.
156	6	"Point of View"	Christian I. Nyby II	Leo V. Gordon	November 12, 1974
Sgt. MacDonald is unhappy about two things: his marriage – and radio problems among the officers causing delays in response. Mac reaches out to Malloy about his wife opening an antique shop which is taking time away from him and the kids. Mac later realizes his situation during a call with an old married couple where the wife (whom the husband thought had run away) likes to go to the pizza parlor alone and listen to music, and the husband doesn't understand her need for some alone time. Other calls include a woman taken hostage by two robbers who head to the roof of a building; the suspects jump to a different roof but leave the hostage behind, and the robbers are apprehended with the help of Air Ten.
157	7	"Lady Beware"	Dennis Donnelly	William J. Keenan	November 19, 1974
A serial rapist is on the loose. Malloy and Reed team up with Sgt. Gloria Tyler to teach self-defense techniques to a group of girls at a school near where the attacks have been occurring. Later, Tyler is used as bait to lure the rapist out, and he is captured after a pursuit. Other incidents include a home burglary involving a man whom the officers know and his nephew, and a shoplifter in a rain coat who escapes into a bar where he tries to be a stand-up comic.
158	8	"Excessive Force"	Lawrence Doheny	R. J. Wagar	December 3, 1974
Malloy and Reed search for a six-year-old girl in a red sweater who was kidnapped. Malloy finds the girl in a neighbor's house – the neighbor has kidnapped and raped the girl, and she is unconscious. The perp attempts to escape, Malloy catches him and loses his cool when the suspect claims that the girl was "asking for it." The suspect files excessive force charges against Malloy, which he admits to; he knows he will be punished by his old mentor, Capt. (formerly Lt.) Moore (played by Art Gilmore, reprising his role from the first two seasons) which may derail his ambition to become sergeant. Moore gives Malloy a four-day suspension for his actions. Other calls include rescuing a man who got stuck in the storm drain system.
159	9	"Alcohol"	Hollingsworth Morse	William J. Keenan	December 10, 1974
A burglar is on the loose, and the officers handle a call with a drunk who is nearly a dead-ringer for the burglar, later he ends up falling down at a bar where Officer Woods was handling a call regarding him. Other calls include looking for an antique stove an Asian woman gave away without knowing her husband had hid money inside it, getting an obese woman out of a phone booth, and a stakeout for the burglar mentioned at roll call resulting in his capture; during the pursuit, the charity truck that picked up the antique stove is located, and the money is returned to the family. Dick Van Patten guest stars.
160	10	"Credit Risk"	Hollingsworth Morse	Sidney Morse	December 17, 1974
Reed's wife Jean is turned down for credit when purchasing a washer and Reed goes to the credit bureau to see why; the reason was that his name was confused with another James Reed with a different middle initial, and is cleared up. Other incidents include a hit-and-run accident, the victim gives a description and license number of the car that hit her, which is found with damage but the owner insists she was not involved; further investigation proves the owner right and they locate the real suspect, two boys that stole camping gear and later found when they were trying to hitchhike, and they arrest a liquor store owner in error while he was chasing the robbery suspect.
161	11	"Christmas"	Norman Abbott	James Bonnett	December 24, 1974
Marty Ingels guest stars. Citizens complain about a man playing his bagpipes, delivering a Christmas tree to a retirement home, two teenagers steal a load of radioactive material inside a truck, a man desperate to hide the smell of perfume on his clothes, and a robbery suspect who takes to the rooftops intent on suicide by cop
162	12	"Pot Shot"	Dennis Donnelly	Carl Jamesson	January 14, 1975
On his day off, Malloy stops by a laundromat to drop off his (and his girlfriend's) clothes when the manager complains about a patron tying up a dryer containing marijuana. On patrol, Malloy and Reed handle a fight between a divinity student and a group of men for taking the Lord's name in vain, attempt to reunite a Finnish girl with her family, resolve a domestic dispute between one neighbor and another neighbor's kids, and pursue a known drug dealer.
163	13	"G.T.A."	Christian I. Nyby, II	Leo V. Gordon	January 21, 1975
A rash of auto thefts which result from the cars being tagged as abandoned has hit the city, Malloy and Reed get a call for another theft, then get another and decide to use the second car as bait, following a tow truck to the scrap yard the cars are taken to. Other calls include two teenage boys who enter a house that is being fumigated, and die from the poison gas, and track and pursue a robbery suspect after spotting him at a bus stop, while taking time to determine why Malloy's girlfriend's son is getting bad grades.
164	14	"Victim of the Crime"	Hollingsworth Morse	Walter Dallenbach	January 28, 1975
The watch starts with an elderly woman whose TV was stolen and asks why nothing more is done for victims of crime. A silent alarm at a shop results in the owner being shot and critically injured; one suspect is caught, the other escapes when Reed has to save a baby in a runaway carriage. The shooting puts the family in a financial crunch, which can be helped with paperwork from a new program to help victims of violent crimes, but none are available. The officers question the bail bondsman to determine where the second suspect is, obtain the vehicle description and license number from a neighbor, then arrest him after pursuit in vehicle and foot. Another silent alarm finds young men robbing a drive-in, but their car stalls trying to get away. The forms for victims' families finally arrive and are provided to those that need them. Amy Milner, Martin Milner's daughter, appears in the episode as the shop owner's daughter.
165	15	"Pressure Point"	Dennis Donnelly	J. Rickley Dumm	February 4, 1975
Officer Woods has a new rookie partner, Don Allen, who has a stutter. Allen nearly gets Malloy and Reed killed because he finds difficulty in warning them about a possible ambush during a search for an armed robbery suspect. Other incidents include a drug store owner faking a heart attack to stop an armed robbery, a B&E-turned-landlord/tenant dispute, and a real-estate agent whose good intentions result in a mob scene.
166	16	"Ladies' Night"	David Nelson	William J. Keenan	February 18, 1975
Malloy and his girlfriend Judy (Aneta Corsaut) and Jim and Jean Reed (Kristin Nelson) agree to a double-date, before then the officers and Motor Officer Grant have to corral three runaway cows from an overturned truck, ticket a girl for unsafe bicycling who likes Malloy but thinks Reed is a grouch, and respond to a barfight which is really a pick-pocketing scheme. En route to the date, Reed spots a robbery in progress; he drops Jean off to call for uniformed assistance while he pursues and catches the suspect, causing him to rip his clothing and miss the date.
167	17	"Citizen with Gun"	Christian Nyby	Walter Dallenbach	March 4, 1975
Malloy and Reed back up Officers Wells and Brady (who, like Wells, likes to "do things his own way") on a domestic dispute involving a husband with a gun. Calls include a dead body which turned out to be a girl playing with a mannequin, a man who likes to climb the sides of abandoned buildings, and a taxi driver who tips off the officers to an in-progress pawn shop burglary; they find the suspect working at a car wash and arrest him. The officers once again back up Wells and Brady on a prowler call where the homeowner comes out shooting. The four officers also hone their skills on the firing range in preparation for their monthly qualification.
168	18	"Follow Up"	Joseph Pevney	Leo V. Gordon	March 11, 1975
Reed tries to sell Malloy on a used fishing boat, but Malloy feels something isn't right. Calls include a man trying to sell a stolen horse to a riding academy, the officers getting a tip on a restaurant parking attendant who looks suspicious, and the officers being accused of impropriety when a socialite's diamond ring turns up missing during an investigation.
169	19	"Suicide"	Dennis Donnelly	Brian Taggert	March 18, 1975
A man in a green Ford Pinto calls his wife and tells her he plans to commit suicide at 2:00 pm. Malloy and Reed locate the car and the officers stop him before he can carry out his attempt. Other calls include an abandoned newborn baby found in a trash can, and an elderly woman who alerts the officers to a car stripping operation.
170	20	"Operation Action"	Dennis Donnelly	David H. Vowell	March 25, 1975
Malloy is kidnapped leaving the station by a drug runner and his female accomplice, demanding her boyfriend be released from jail in exchange for Malloy. When the couple has Malloy contact the station to confirm his status, he reveals a clue about where they found a girl with a mannequin (a reference to the episode "Citizen With Gun"). Reed finds Malloy's car and a citizen gives a description of Malloy's kidnappers and their car, which Reed finds abandoned but he locates their hideout from case files, meanwhile Malloy manages to spill gasoline and ignites it, allowing Malloy to be rescued by Reed who notices the gunfire and smoke. Kristen McCord, Kent McCord's daughter, guest stars.
171	21	"Gus Corbin"	Dennis Donnelly	Leo V. Gordon	April 1, 1975
Malloy is filling in for Sgt. MacDonald as Watch Commander, so Reed rides with a new partner, Gus Corbin (played by Mark Harmon), an officer with nine months on the job, and they begin watch with a purse snatcher found inside a church confessional, then a break-in at a pharmacy leads to the real intention of the thieves – the next door pawn shop. Corbin defies Malloy's direct order not to search the pawn shop until backup arrives, which results in a dressing down by the acting Watch Commander, and the two suspects are captured. Finally, Corbin loses his gun during a foot pursuit and captures the suspect despite being unarmed.
172	22	"Dana Hall"	Hollingsworth Morse	William J. Keenan	April 29, 1975
Malloy continues his assignment as acting Watch Commander, so Reed is paired with Officer Dana Hall (played by Jo Ann Pflug), while Officers Wells and Woods treat the new policewoman with the typical (for the 1970s) "not the woman's place" attitude, Reed treats her with respect and they go on patrol, where they encounter an underage DUI suspect with an uncooperative mother, locate and search a car stripping operation, and arrest numerous young people who riot at an outdoor rock concert.
173	23	"Something Worth Dying For"	Hollingsworth Morse	David H. Vowell	May 13, 1975
174	24	"Something Worth Dying For"	Hollingsworth Morse	David H. Vowell	May 20, 1975
Part 1: Reed's bust of a drug dealer named Sparky was thrown out in court, and after Sgt. MacDonald offers him a chance to join the Vice squad for 30 days to gain experience, Reed volunteers, however the lifestyle and training cause a rift between him and Jean (played by Kristin Nelson), and Reed quickly discovers how dirty Vice is; he's involved in a bust where a man wants to trade drugs for pictures of young boys, and the assignment is taking its toll on him. Malloy and Officer Woods team up to assist in the arrest of two drug dealers, but Malloy is shot and wounded during the bust and rescued by Reed. Sian Barbara Allen guest-stars as an informant. Part 2: Reed is awarded the Medal of Valor by the LAPD for rescuing a wounded Malloy from the shootout (presented by then-LAPD Chief Edward M. Davis), and despite Jean's feelings about her husband's new assignment and about him taking the investigator's exam to become a Detective, she decides to attend the ceremony. Malloy and Reed reunite and handle cases; including a typing school B&E where both money and typewriters are suspected stolen, a suspicion confirmed by an assistant who allows the officers to freely check the typewriters; and a shootout in a warehouse full of mannequins with two young people. Aneta Corsaut and Kristin Nelson guest-star. Sian Barbara Allen guest-stars as an informant.
