= Ricky Nelson discography =

Rick Nelson discography
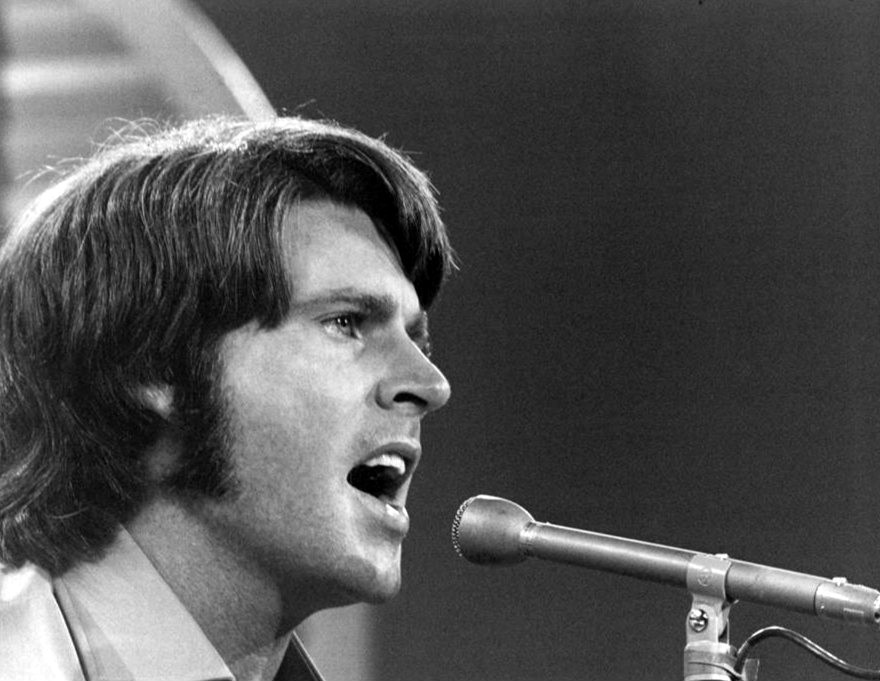
- Rick Nelson performing in 1970
- Studio albums: 24
- Soundtrack albums: 1
- Live albums: 4
- Compilation albums: 9
- Singles: 94
- Box sets: 4
- Notable archival projects: 5

Eric Hilliard Nelson (May 8, 1940 – December 31, 1985), known professionally as Ricky Nelson until his 21st birthday when he officially dropped the "y" and simply became Rick Nelson, was an American singer-songwriter. His discography comprises 24 original studio albums, one original live album, various compilation and archival projects, and 94 singles.

== Albums ==
=== Studio albums ===
Year	Album	Peak positions			
Year	Album	US	US Country	AUS	CAN
1957	Ricky	1	—	—N/a	—
1958	Ricky Nelson: features "Don't Leave Me This Way", Nelson's earliest recorded composition	7	—	—N/a	—
1959	Ricky Sings Again	14	—	—N/a	1
1959	Songs by Ricky	22	—	—N/a	—
1960	More Songs by Ricky	18	—	—N/a	—
1961	Rick Is 21	8	—	—N/a	—
1962	Album Seven by Rick: Nelson's seventh studio album and the final comprising new material on Imperial Records	27	—	—N/a	—
1963	For Your Sweet Love: Nelson's Decca Records debut and eighth studio album	20	—	—N/a	—
1963	Rick Nelson Sings "For You": Nelson's second Decca album	14	—	—N/a	—
1964	The Very Thought of You	—	—	—N/a	—
1964	Spotlight on Rick	—	—	—N/a	—
1965	Best Always	—	—	—N/a	—
1965	Love and Kisses	—	—	—N/a	—
1966	Bright Lights and Country Music: Nelson's exploration of the country rock genre; "You Just Can't Quit" was penned by Nelson; featuring guitarists James Burton, Clarence White, and Glen Campbell	—	—	—N/a	—
1967	Country Fever: the sequel to Bright Lights and Country Music; "Alone" was composed by Nelson; James Burton, Clarence White, and Glen Campbell are among the players	—	—	—N/a	—
1967	Another Side of Rick: orchestrated psychedelic pop; "Marshmallow Skies" and "Promenade in Green" were co-written with James Burton and John Boylan, respectively	—	—	—N/a	—
1968	Perspective: more orchestrated psychedelic pop; "Hello to the Wind" was co-written alongside producer John Boylan	—	—	—N/a	—
1970	Rick Sings Nelson: all 10 songs composed by Nelson including "Down Along the Bayou Country", "California", and "How Long"	196	—	33	—
1971	Rudy the Fifth: seven tunes written by Nelson including "This Train", "Life", and "Gypsy Pilot"	204	—	38	—
1972	Garden Party: six songs penned by Nelson including the career-defining title cut	32	26	67	39
1974	Windfall: Nelson's final Decca / MCA album; "Someone to Love", "Lifestream", and "Windfall" were composed by Nelson	190	—	61	97
1977	Intakes: Nelson's only released Epic Records LP; the final appearance of the Stone Canyon Band; "It's Another Day" and "Something You Can't Buy" were Nelson's songwriting contributions	—	—	—	—
1981	Playing to Win: Nelson's sole Capitol Records album; "The Loser Babe Is You" and "Call It What You Want" were his final released compositions	153	—	—	—
1985	All My Best: studio re-recordings of 21 of Nelson's greatest hits plus "You Know What I Mean" overseen by longtime arranger Jimmie Haskell; later reissues eliminated various songs	—	—	58	—
1986	The Memphis Sessions: dubbed Rockabilly Renaissance in the late '70s before Epic Records cancelled its release; a few months after Nelson's death, CBS hired Nashville producer Steve Buckingham to replace the original drum and lead guitar tracks and remix the material	—	62	—	—

=== Soundtrack ===
Year	Album
1966	On the Flip Side: a Burt Bacharach and Hal David-scored soundtrack for the rare 60-minute ABC special; Nelson is heard on only four songs—"It Doesn't Matter Anymore", "They Don't Give Medals (To Yesterday's Heroes)", "Take a Broken Heart", and a duet with costar Joannie Sommers on "Try to See It My Way"

=== EP ===
Year	Album
1960	Ricky Sings Spirituals: Includes 4 songs: "Glory Train", "March with the Band of the Lord", "If You Believe It", "I Bowed My Head in Shame"; Nelson's only EP

=== Lost studio albums ===
Year	Album
1978	Back to Vienna: produced by Bob Dylan's session organist Al Kooper; Epic scuttled the 10-song studio LP, which was finally distributed in its entirety on the mammoth 2010 Bear Family box The Last Time Around as well as Real Gone Music's The Complete Epic Recordings.
1979	Rockabilly Renaissance (aka The Memphis Sessions): The only time Nelson recorded outside Los Angeles.; "That Ain't the Way Love's Supposed to Be" was co-written by Nelson and Flying Burrito Brother John Beland and attached as the B-side of Bobby Darin's "Dream Lover".; Excepting the afore-mentioned single, Epic canned the Larry Rogers-helmed album.; Epic belatedly released four additional sides ("Lay Back in the Arms of Someone" and renditions of John Fogerty's "Almost Saturday Night", Arthur Crudup's "That's All Right" (popularized by Elvis Presley), and Buddy Holly's "Rave On") on a February 1981 EP titled Four You. According to biographer Philip Bashe, Nelson was unaware of his former label's intentions and was incensed to discover that applause had been overdubbed onto the Holly rocker to simulate a concert atmosphere.; The summer after Nelson's death, Epic compiled 10 cuts into The Memphis Sessions, omitting "That Ain't the Way Love's Supposed to Be".
1986	Untitled Curb Records Studio Album: Jimmie Haskell continued his renewed collaboration with Nelson, laying down instrumental tracks and guide vocals in the fall of 1985 at Baby-O Recorders and Conway Studios in North Hollywood for 10 new songs, albeit none penned by Nelson.; If the entertainer had not perished on New Year's Eve, the rockabilly-themed project was poised for a 1986 release with Mike Curb's Nashville-based Curb Records.; These are the only Nelson songs still relegated to the vaults although unauthorized, unfinished versions have leaked.

=== Live albums ===
Year	Album	Peak positions	
Year	Album	US	CAN
1970	Rick Nelson in Concert at the Troubadour, 1969: Nelson regains his footing as a country rocker; the debut of the Stone Canyon Band; the sole live album issued during Nelson's lifetime; "Come on In", "Who Cares About Tomorrow", "Promises", and "Easy to Be Free" were Nelson compositions.	54	66
1989	Ricky Nelson Live (1983–1985): issued by Rhino Records; 18 songs featuring the Jordanaires; The first half was recorded on August 22, 1985, at the Universal Amphitheatre in Los Angeles while the remaining nine were waxed on February 22, 1983, at the Genesee Theatre in Waukegan, Illinois.; Nelson's second live album	—	—
1991	Live at the Aladdin: Nelson was booked at the Las Vegas hotel on three occasions—March 7–20, June 6–20, and August 25 – September 5, 1978. It is unclear which show the 12 songs come from; featuring steel guitarist Tom Brumley, lead guitarist John Beland, and the Sweet Inspirations on backing vocals; produced by Beland; issued on the British Magnum Force label; Nelson's third live album	—	—
1999	A Night to Remember: An audio document of Nelson's August 22, 1985, televised concert at the Universal Amphitheatre in Los Angeles.; released by Fuel 2000 Records in cooperation with Varèse Sarabande; Nelson's fourth live album	—	—

=== Notable archival projects ===
Year	Album
1993	Stay Young: The Epic Recordings: the first compilation to unearth four of the "Back to Vienna" outtakes and strip away Steve Buckingham's mid-'80s production flourishes
2003	The Lost '60s Recordings: between 1961 and 1962 Nelson, Glen Campbell, Jerry "Travelin' Man" Fuller, and Dave Burgess collaborated vocally in two studio groups—the Trophies and the Fleas—although Nelson was never credited because he was contractually bound to Imperial Records; 18 tracks issued by Varèse Sarabande
2004	Rick's Rarities (1964–1974): an Ace Records compilation excavating a selection of Nelson's unreleased Decca tunes
2012	The Complete Epic Recordings: Real Gone Music released two CDs containing Nelson's entire 1976–1979 Epic tenure (i.e. Intakes, Back to Vienna, and Rockabilly Renaissance)

=== Box sets ===
Year	Album
2000	Legacy: notable as the first Nelson box set; a four-CD career-encompassing project distributed by Capitol
2001	The American Dream: The Complete Imperial and Verve Recordings (1957–1963): the first installment of a chronological archival series released by Bear Family, a German indie label specializing in vintage country and pop
2008	For You: The Decca Years (1963–1969): the second Bear Family box set devoted to Nelson
2010	The Last Time Around (1970–1982): the third and ultimate Bear Family box set revisits Nelson's Stone Canyon Band tenure

=== Compilation albums ===
Year	Album	Peak positions
Year	Album	US
1963	Best Sellers by Rick Nelson: Imperial Records; 1957 single "Stood Up" b/w "Waitin' in School" makes its LP debut	112
1963	It's Up to You: Imperial Records; 1962 single "It's Up to You" b/w "I Need You" makes its album debut	128
1963	Million Sellers: Imperial Records; "Young World", "Everlovin'", and "I Wanna Be Loved" make their LP debut	—
1963	A Long Vacation: Imperial Records	—
1964	Rick Nelson Sings for You: Imperial compilation distributed on the coattails of Nelson's Decca hit For You	—
1989	Lonesome Town (All-Time Greatest Hits)	—
2005	Greatest Hits: Capitol Records	56
2007	Ricky Rocks: Bear Family	—
2008	Greatest Love Songs: Capitol set cherry-picking romantic highlights from Nelson's tenures on Imperial and Epic	—

== Singles ==
Year	Single (A-side / B-side) Non-charting B-sides from same album as A-sides except as indicated	Peak chart positions									Label and catalog no.	Album
Year	Single (A-side / B-side) Non-charting B-sides from same album as A-sides except as indicated	US BB	US CB	US Cou.	US AC	AUS	CAN RPM	CAN Cou.	CAN AC	UK	Label and catalog no.	Album
1957	"A Teenager's Romance" /	2	8	—	—	34	—	—	—	—	Verve 10047	Teen Time (Various artists)
1957	"I'm Walkin'"	17	12	—	—	10	—	—	—	—	Verve 10047	Teen Time (Various artists)
1957	"You're My One and Only Love" b/w "Honey Rock" (by Barney Kessel)	16	23	—	—	—	—	—	—	—	Verve 10070	Teen Time (Various artists)
1957	"Have I Told You Lately That I Love You" /	29	21	—	—	—	—	—	—	—	Imperial 5463	Ricky
1957	"Be-Bop Baby"	5	6	—	—	33	—	—	—	—	Imperial 5463	Ricky
1958	"Stood Up" /	2	3	8	—	33	—	—	—	27	Imperial 5483	Best Sellers by Rick Nelson
1958	"Waitin' in School"	18	6	12	—	—	—	—	—	—	Imperial 5483	Best Sellers by Rick Nelson
1958	"My Bucket's Got a Hole in It" /	18	20	10	—	79	—	—	—	—	Imperial 5503	Non-album track
1958	"Believe What You Say"	8	12	10	—	77	—	—	—	—	Imperial 5503	Ricky Sings Again
1958	"Poor Little Fool" b/w "Don't Leave Me This Way"	1	2	3	—	10	—	—	—	4	Imperial 5528	Ricky Nelson
1958	"Someday" b/w "I Got a Feeling" (Non-album track)	—	—	—	—	66	—	—	—	9	London 8732 (UK only)	Ricky Nelson
1958	"Lonesome Town" /	7	7	—	—	26	—	—	—	—	Imperial 5545	Ricky Sings Again
1958	"I Got a Feeling"	10	15	—	—	85	—	—	—	27	Imperial 5545	Non-album track
1959	"It's Late" /	9	6	—	—	28	—	—	—	3	Imperial 5565	Ricky Sings Again
1959	"Never Be Anyone Else But You"	6	5	—	—	14	—	—	—	14	Imperial 5565	Ricky Sings Again
1959	"Just a Little Too Much" /	9	18	—	—	11	—	—	—	11	Imperial 5595	Songs by Ricky
1959	"Sweeter Than You"	9	11	—	—	63	—	—	—	19	Imperial 5595	Songs by Ricky
1959	"I Wanna Be Loved" /	20	21	—	—	35	—	—	—	30	Imperial 5614	Million Sellers
1959	"Mighty Good"	38	57	—	—	35	—	—	—	—	Imperial 5614	Non-album track
1960	"Young Emotions" /	12	11	—	—	33	—	—	—	48	Imperial 5663	Million Sellers
1960	"Right by My Side"	59	70	—	—	33	—	—	—	—	Imperial 5663	Million Sellers
1960	"I'm Not Afraid" /	27	40	—	—	—	—	—	—	—	Imperial 5685	More Songs by Ricky
1960	"Yes Sir, That's My Baby"	34	49	—	—	36	—	—	—	—	Imperial 5685	Million Sellers
1960	"You Are the Only One" /	25	29	—	—	76	—	—	—	—	Imperial 5707	Million Sellers
1960	"Milk Cow Blues"	79	101	—	—	—	—	—	—	—	Imperial 5707	Million Sellers
1961	"Travelin' Man" /	1	1	—	—	1	—	—	—	2	Imperial 5741	Rick Is 21
1961	"Hello Mary Lou"	9	9	—	—	1	—	—	—	2	Imperial 5741	Rick Is 21
1961	"A Wonder Like You" /	11	11	—	—	14	—	—	—	—	Imperial 5770	Non-album tracks
1961	"Everlovin'"	16	20	—	—	—	—	—	—	23	Imperial 5770	Non-album tracks
1962	"Young World" /	5	9	—	—	11	—	—	—	19	Imperial 5805	Non-album tracks
1962	"Summertime"	89	111	—	—	—	—	—	—	—	Imperial 5805	Album Seven by Rick
1962	"Today's Teardrops" (AU & Europe only) /	—	—	—	—	32	—	—	—	—	Imperial IH 568 (EU); London HL-1954 (AU)	Album Seven by Rick
1962	"Mad, Mad World"	—	—	—	—	32	—	—	—	—	Imperial IH 568 (EU); London HL-1954 (AU)	Album Seven by Rick
1962	"Teen Age Idol" /	5	9	—	2	18	—	—	—	39	Imperial 5864	Non-album tracks
1962	"I've Got My Eyes on You (And I Like What I See)"	105	130	—	—	18	—	—	—	—	Imperial 5864	Non-album tracks
1962	"It's Up to You" /	6	7	—	4	18	—	—	—	22	Imperial 5901	It's Up to You
1962	"I Need You"	83	91	—	—	—	—	—	—	—	Imperial 5901	It's Up to You
1963	"I'm in Love Again" /	67	51	—	—	50	—	—	—	—	Imperial 5910	Ricky Nelson
1963	"That's All"	48	53	—	—	50	—	—	—	—	Imperial 5910	Songs by Ricky
1963	"You Don't Love Me Anymore (And I Can Tell)" /	47	48	—	—	—	—	—	—	—	Decca 31475	For Your Sweet Love
1963	"I Got a Woman"	49	58	—	—	45	—	—	—	—	Decca 31475	For Your Sweet Love
1963	"If You Can't Rock Me" /	100	—	—	—	—	—	—	—	—	Imperial 5935	It's Up to You
1963	"Old Enough to Love"	94	86	—	—	—	—	—	—	—	Imperial 5935	Ricky Sings Again
1963	"A Long Vacation" b/w "Mad Mad World"	120	107	—	—	—	—	—	—	—	Imperial 5958	A Long Vacation
1963	"Gypsy Woman" /	62	91	—	—	26	—	—	—	—	Decca 31495	For Your Sweet Love
1963	"String Along"	25	17	—	—	26	—	—	—	—	Decca 31495	For Your Sweet Love
1963	"There's Not a Minute" b/w "Time After Time" (from More Songs by Ricky)	127	149	—	—	—	—	—	—	—	Imperial 5985	Album Seven by Rick
1963	"Fools Rush In" /	12	—	—	—	26	—	—	—	12	Decca 31533	Rick Nelson Sings for You
1963	"Down Home"	126	131	—	—	—	—	—	—	—	Decca 31533	Rick Nelson Sings for You
1963	"Today's Teardrops" b/w "Thank You Darlin'"	54	65	—	—	—	—	—	—	—	Imperial 66004	Album Seven by Rick
1963	"For You" b/w "That's All She Wrote"	6	8	—	1	10	—	—	—	14	Decca 31574	Rick Nelson Sings for You
1964	"Congratulations" b/w "One Minute To One" (from Songs by Ricky)	63	104	—	—	—	—	—	—	—	Imperial 66017	Album Seven by Rick
1964	"The Very Thought of You" b/w "I Wonder (If Your Love Will Ever Belong to Me)"	26	19	—	11	65	—	—	—	—	Decca 31612	The Very Thought of You
1964	"Lucky Star" b/w "Everybody But Me"	127	142	—	—	—	—	—	—	—	Imperial 66039	Rick Is 21
1964	"There's Nothing I Can Say" /	47	49	—	18	90	—	—	—	—	Decca 31656	Non-album track
1964	"Lonely Corner"	113	105	—	—	—	—	—	—	—	Decca 31656	Best Always
1964	"A Happy Guy" /	82	83	—	—	—	—	—	—	—	Decca 31703	Spotlight on Rick
1964	"Don't Breathe a Word"		tag	—	—	—	—	—	—	—	Decca 31703	Spotlight on Rick
1965	"Mean Old World" b/w "When the Chips Are Down"	96	94	—	—	—	—	—	—	—	Decca 31756	Best Always
1965	"Come Out Dancing" b/w "Yesterday's Love" (from Spotlight on Rick)	130	131	—	—	—	—	—	—	—	Decca 31800	Love and Kisses
1965	"Love and Kisses" b/w "Say You Love Me"	—	124	—	—	—	—	—	—	—	Decca 31845	Love and Kisses
1966	"Fire Breathin' Dragon" b/w "Your Kind of Lovin'"	—	—	—	—	—	—	—	—	—	Decca 31900	Non-album tracks
1966	"You Just Can't Quit" b/w "Louisiana Man"	108	76	—	—	81	24	—	—	—	Decca 31956	Bright Lights and Country Music
1966	"Things You Gave Me" b/w "Alone"	—	—	—	—	—	—	—	—	—	Decca 32026	Country Fever
1967	"They Don't Give Medals (To Yesterday's Heroes)" b/w "Take a Broken Heart"	—	—	—	—	—	—	—	—	—	Decca 32055	On the Flip Side – Original Cast Album
1967	"Take a City Bride" b/w "I'm Called Lonely" (Non-album track)	—	—	58	—	—	—	—	—	—	Decca 32120	Country Fever
1968	"Suzanne on a Sunday Morning" b/w "Moonshine" (Non-album track)	—	—	—	—	—	—	—	—	—	Decca 32176	Another Side of Rick
1968	"Dream Weaver" b/w "Baby Close Its Eyes"	—	—	—	—	—	—	—	—	—	Decca 32222	Another Side of Rick
1969	"Don't Blame It on Your Wife" b/w "Promenade in Green"	—	—	—	—	—	—	—	—	—	Decca 32284	Another Side of Rick
1969	"Don't Make Promises" b/w "Barefoot Boy"	—	—	—	—	—	—	—	—	—	Decca 32298	Another Side of Rick
1969	"She Belongs to Me" b/w "Promises" (Non-album track)	33	30	—	27	—	33	—	—	—	Decca 32558	Rick Nelson in Concert
1970	"Easy to Be Free" b/w "Come On In"	48	50	—	21	—	46	—	—	—	Decca 32635	Rick Nelson in Concert
1970	"I Shall Be Released" b/w "If You Gotta Go, Go Now"	102	—	—	—	—	—	—	—	—	Decca 32676	Rick Nelson in Concert
1970	"We Got Such a Long Way to Go" b/w "Look at Mary"	—	—	—	—	—	—	—	—	—	Decca 32711	Rick Sings Nelson
1971	"How Long" b/w "Down Along the Bayou Country"	—	—	—	—	—	—	—	—	—	Decca 32739	Rick Sings Nelson
1971	"Life" b/w "California" (from Rick Sings Nelson)	109	110	—	15	—	—	—	—	—	Decca 32779	Rudy the Fifth
1972	"Thank You Lord" b/w "Sing Me a Song"	—	—	—	—	—	—	—	—	—	Decca 32860	Rudy the Fifth
1972	"Gypsy Pilot" b/w "Love Minus Zero/No Limit"	—	—	—	—	—	—	—	—	—	Decca 32906	Rudy the Fifth
1972	"Garden Party" b/w "So Long Mama"	6	3	44	1	6	1	52	13	41	Decca 32980	Garden Party
1973	"Palace Guard" b/w "A Flower Opens Gently By"	65	79	—	—	—	80	—	—	—	MCA 40001	Garden Party
1973	"Lifestream" b/w "Evil Woman Child"	—	105	—	—	—	—	—	—	—	MCA 40130	Windfall
1974	"Windfall" b/w "Legacy"	—	116	—	46	62	—	—	—	—	MCA 40187	Windfall
1974	"One Night Stand" b/w "Lifestream"	—	—	89	—	—	—	—	—	—	MCA 40214	Windfall
1975	"Try (Try to Fall in Love)" b/w "Louisiana Belle"	—	—	—	—	—	—	—	—	—	MCA 40392	Non-album tracks
1975	"Rock and Roll Lady" b/w "Fadeaway"	—	—	—	—	—	—	—	—	—	MCA 40458	Non-album tracks
1977	"You Can't Dance" b/w "It's Another Day"	—	—	—	—	—	—	—	—	—	Epic 50458	Intakes
1978	"Gimme a Little Sign" b/w "Something You Just Can't Buy"	—	—	—	—	—	—	—	—	—	Epic 50501	Intakes
1979	"Dream Lover" b/w "That Ain't the Way Love's Supposed to Be"	—	—	59	29	—	—	55	—	—	Epic 50674	Rockabilly Renaissance (Unreleased)
1981	"It Hasn't Happened Yet" b/w "Call It What You Want"	—	—	—	—	—	—	—	—	—	Capitol 4974	Playing To Win
1981	"Believe What You Say" (new version) b/w "The Loser Babe Is You"	—	—	—	—	—	—	—	—	—	Capitol 4988	Playing To Win
1982	"Give 'Em My Number" b/w "No Fair Falling in Love"	—	—	—	—	—	—	—	—	—	Capitol 5178	Non-album tracks
1986	"You Know What I Mean" b/w "Don't Leave Me This Way" (new version)	—	—	—	—	—	—	—	—	—	MCA 52781	All My Best
1986	"Dream Lover" (re-issue) b/w "Rave On"	—	—	88	—	—	—	57	—	—	Epic 06066	Memphis Sessions
1991	"Hello Mary Lou" b/w "It's Late" (UK only release)	—	—	—	—	—	—	—	—	45	Liberty EMCT 2	

=== Billboard Year-end performances ===
Year	Song	Year-end position
1957	"A Teenager's Romance"	25
1957	"Be-Bop Baby"	42
1958	"Stood Up" / "Waitin' in School"	17
1958	"Poor Little Fool"	24
1959	"Never Be Anyone Else But You"	42
1959	"It's Late"	74
1959	"Just a Little Too Much"	78
1959	"Sweeter Than You"	83
1960	"Young Emotions"	85
1961	"Travelin' Man"	23
1961	"Hello Mary Lou"	49
1962	"Young World"	43
1972	"Garden Party"	46
