= All My Best (Ricky Nelson album) =

Studio album by Ricky Nelson
- Released: 1985
- Genre: Rock and Roll; Rockabilly; Country Rock
- Length: 38:14
- Label: Silver Eagle

Ricky Nelson chronology
Playing to Win (1981)	All My Best (1985)	The Memphis Sessions (1986)

Professional ratings
Review scores
Source	Rating
The Encyclopedia of Popular Music	4/5 stars
The Rolling Stone Album Guide	3/5 stars
MusicHound	2/5 stars

All My Best is a 1985 Ricky Nelson album. Although the record is a collection of greatest hits, it is not a compilation but a new studio recording. Nelson conceived the album for his own Silver Eagle label and promoted the record himself on late-night television. The album was the last work of any kind released in Nelson's lifetime before his death in a plane crash in December of that year.

Nelson recruited the Jordanaires to provide backing vocals, as well as familiar session musicians. Since Nelson's session musicians had not performed the songs for many years, some differences from the original recordings are audible on the album.

== Track listing ==
No.	Title	Writer(s)	Album	Length
1.	"Travelin' Man"	Jerry Fuller	Rick Is 21 (1961)	2:19
2.	"Hello Mary Lou"	Gene Pitney	Rick Is 21 (1961)	2:19
3.	"Poor Little Fool"	Sharon Sheeley	Ricky Nelson (1958)	2:27
4.	"Stood Up"	Dub Dickerson, Erma Herrold	Best Sellers by Rick Nelson (1963)	1:36
5.	"You Are The Only One"	Baker Knight	Million Sellers (1963)	2:33
6.	"It's Late"	Dorsey Burnette	Ricky Sings Again (1959)	1:55
7.	"You Know What I Mean"	Mickey Jupp	Previously unreleased	1:47
8.	"Young World"	Fuller	Non-album track (1962)	2:18
9.	"Lonesome Town"	Knight	Ricky Sings Again (1959)	2:12
10.	"I Got A Feeling"	Knight	Non-album track (1958)	1:55
11.	"Just a Little Too Much"	Johnny Burnette	Songs by Ricky (1959)	2:00
12.	"Believe What You Say"	Johnny Burnette, Dorsey Burnette	Ricky Sings Again (1959)	2:06
13.	"It's Up to You"	Fuller	It's Up to You (1962)	2:46
14.	"Waitin' in School"	Johnny Burnette, Dorsey Burnette	Best Sellers by Rick Nelson (1963)	1:58
15.	"Never Be Anyone Else But You"	Knight	Ricky Sings Again (1959)	2:13
16.	"Don't Leave Me This Way"	Ricky Nelson	Ricky Nelson (1958)	2:24
17.	"Fools Rush In"	Rube Bloom, Johnny Mercer	Rick Nelson Sings for You (1963)	2:35
18.	"Teen Age Idol"	Jack Lewis	Non-album track (1962)	2:29
19.	"I'm Walkin'"	Fats Domino, Dave Bartholomew	Non-album track (1957)	1:38
20.	"Mighty Good"	Knight	Non-album track (1959)	2:05
21.	"Sweeter Than You"	Knight	Songs by Ricky (1959)	2:26
22.	"Garden Party"	Nelson	Garden Party (1972)	3:58

== Charts ==
Chart (1985–1986)	Peak position
Australia (Kent Music Report)	58
