= Playing to Win (Rick Nelson album) =

Studio album by Rick Nelson
- Released: January 1981
- Genre: Rock and roll, country rock
- Length: 54:16
- Label: Capitol
- Producer: Jack Nitzsche

Rick Nelson chronology
Intakes (1977)	Playing to Win (1981)	All My Best (1985)

Singles from Playing to Win
- 1. "It Hasn't Happened Yet" Released: January 1981; 2. "Believe What You Say" Released: March 1981

Playing to Win is the twenty-third studio album by American singer Rick Nelson, released in January 1981 by Capitol Records. It was the last album of new material Nelson released in his lifetime. His next studio effort, All My Best, featured re-recordings of old Nelson hits while The Memphis Sessions, his final collection of all-new material, was released posthumously.

It featured several rockabilly songs, including "Back to School Days", a contemporary version of "Believe What You Say", and John Fogerty's "Almost Saturday Night", The Tentalive title came from one of his two originals on the album, "Call It What You Want," a jaunty, Rolling Stones-style romp, His other original, however, provided the LP's most prophetic song, "The Loser Babe is You." According to Nelson, "The album was going to be called 'It's Rock and Roll to Me', "but the idea was shelved because Billy Joel brought out a thing with the same theme, I just want to make records that sound like me. I've been through so many people telling me 'Go this direction' and then changing their minds the next day."

The album debuted on the Billboard Top LPs & Tape chart in the issue dated February 21, 1981, and remained on the chart for six weeks, peaking at number 153.

Bear Family included the album in the 2010 The Last Time Around box set.

== Reception ==
Professional ratings
Review scores
Source	Rating
AllMusic	4/5 stars
The Rolling Stone Album Guide	4/5 stars
The Encyclopedia of Popular Music	3/5 stars

William Ruhlmann of AllMusic said that "Nelson updated his rock & roll sound to take into consideration the heartland rock of artists like Bruce Springsteen, Bob Seger, and Tom Petty as well as punk/new wave. As always, he had great taste, which allowed him to pick great material"

Billboard called it "new wave - inflected rock" and "an energetic and fun collection".

Record World thought "The burning guitars of the Burnettes' "Believe What You Say" will appeal to rockers, and John Fogerty's "Almost Saturday Night" and Graham Parker's "Back To Schooldays" are wise cover choices."

== Track listing ==
=== Side one ===
No.	Title	Writer(s)	Length
1.	"Almost Saturday Night"	John Fogerty	2:35
2.	"Believe What You Say"	Dorsey Burnette, Johnny Burnette	2:57
3.	"Little Miss American Dream"	Peter McCannbeli	4:04
4.	"The Loser Babe Is You"		3:46
5.	"Back to Schooldays"	Graham Parker	2:44

=== Side two ===
No.	Title	Writer(s)	Length
1.	"It Hasn't Happened Yet"	John Hiatt	3:32
2.	"Call It What You Want"		3:06
3.	"I Can't Take It No More"	John Davis, Mickey McGee	3:45
4.	"Don't Look at Me"	Hans Wilhelm Steinberg	2:57
5.	"Do the Best You Can"	Ry Cooder, Titleman	4:13

== Charts ==
Chart (1981)	Peak position
US Top LPs & Tape (Billboard)	153
