= In Concert at the Troubadour, 1969 =

Live album by Rick Nelson
- Released: January 1970
- Recorded: October 30–November 2, 1969
- Genre: Country rock
- Length: 39:32
- Label: Decca
- Producers: Joe Sutton, Rick Nelson

Rick Nelson chronology
Perspective (1969)	In Concert at the Troubadour, 1969 (1970)	Rick Sings Nelson (1970)

Professional ratings
Review scores
Source	Rating
Allmusic	4/5 stars
Christgau's Record Guide	B−
The Encyclopedia of Popular Music	3/5 stars
The Rolling Stone Album Guide	4/5 stars

In Concert at the Troubadour, 1969 is a live country rock album by Rick Nelson recorded in Los Angeles during four dates at The Troubadour in late 1969. The album featured the debut of the Stone Canyon Band, which included Randy Meisner, Tom Brumley, Allen Kemp, and Patrick Shanahan, and was Nelson's highest-charting release in three years. The album contains four songs written by Nelson and three Bob Dylan compositions, as well as other songs by Eric Andersen and Tim Hardin. In his cover of Doug Kershaw's "Louisiana Man," he personalizes the song by singing "Gunnar and Matthew are the family twins," referring to his own twins, who would go on to form the rock band Nelson in the 1990s. The performances were attended by many fellow musicians and songwriters.

In 2011, the British label Ace Records issued a remastered version of In Concert at the Troubadour on two compact discs with 30 bonus tracks and a booklet containing detailed information about the shows and songs that were recorded. Bear Family included the album in the 2008 For You: The Decca Years box set.

The album marked Nelson's first appearance on the Billboard album chart in 7 years when it debuted on the Billboard Top LPs chart in the issue dated February 21, 1970, and remained on the chart for 12 weeks, peaking at number 54. it also debuted on the Cashbox albums chart in the issue dated February 28, 1970, and remained on the chart for in a total of 11 weeks, peaking at 63.

== Reception ==
Bruce Eder of AllMusic's described the album as "excellent," noting that it is a "mix of the more enduring of his classic hits and some of the newer songs he was adding to his repertory, including a trio of Bob Dylan compositions and Tim Hardin's 'Red Balloon'."

Billboard gave a positive review, saying it features "top treatments of Dylan's 'I Shall Be Released' and Tim Hardin's 'Red Balloon,' among others."

== Track listing ==
1. "Come on In" (Rick Nelson)
2. "Hello Mary Lou" (Gene Pitney)
3. "Violets of Dawn" (Eric Andersen)
4. "Who Cares About Tomorrow/Promises" (Nelson)
5. "She Belongs to Me" (Bob Dylan)
6. "If You Gotta Go, Go Now" (Dylan)
7. "I'm Walkin'" (Fats Domino, Dave Bartholomew)
8. "Red Balloon" (Tim Hardin)
9. "Louisiana Man" (Doug Kershaw)
10. "Believe What You Say" (Dorsey Burnette, Johnny Burnette)
11. "Easy to Be Free" (Nelson)
12. "I Shall Be Released" (Dylan)

== 2011 Ace Records reissue ==
=== Disc one ===
1. "Come on In" (Nelson) – 2:40
2. "Hello Mary Lou, Goodbye Heart" (Gene Pitney) – 2:35
3. "Violets of Dawn" (Eric Andersen) – 3:25
4. "Who Cares About Tomorrow/Promises" (Nelson) – 5:42
5. "She Belongs to Me" (Bob Dylan) – 2:54
6. "If You Gotta Go, Go Now" (Dylan) – 2:52
7. "I'm Walkin'" (Fats Domino, Dave Bartholomew) – 1:56
8. "Red Balloon" (Tim Hardin) – 3:20
9. "Louisiana Man" (Doug Kershaw) – 3:07
10. "Believe What You Say" (Dorsey Burnette, Johnny Burnette) – 2:03
11. "Easy to Be Free" (Nelson) – 3:22
12. "I Shall Be Released" (Dylan) – 4:06
13. "Violets of Dawn" (Andersen) – 3:12
14. "Travelin' Man" (Jerry Fuller) – 2:16
15. "Tonight I'll Be Staying Here with You" (Dylan) – 2:41
16. "I'm Walkin'" (Domino, Bartholomew) – 2:01
17. "Louisiana Man" (Doug Kershaw) – 2:59
18. "She Belongs to Me" (Dylan) – 2:46
19. "I Shall Be Released" (Dylan) – 3:48
20. "Lady Came From Baltimore" (Hardin) – 2:21
21. "Poor Little Fool" (Sharon Sheeley) – 2:18
22. "Hello Mary Lou, Goodbye Heart" (Pitney) – 2:34

Tracks 1–12 are from the original 1970 album; Tracks 13–22 are newly mixed alternate performances.

=== Disc two ===
1. "Intro/Come on In" (Nelson) – 2:39
2. "Hello Mary Lou" (Pitney) – 2:47
3. "I Shall Be Released" (Dylan) – 3:43
4. "Don Everly Intro/Bye Bye Love" (B. Bryant, F. Bryant) – 2:25
5. "I'm Walkin'" (Domino, Bartholomew) – 1:54
6. "Red Balloon" (Hardin) – 3:11
7. "My Bucket's Got a Hole in It" (Clarence Williams) – 2:16
8. "Easy to Be Free" (Nelson) – 3:13
9. "Louisiana Man" (Kershaw) – 2:55
10. "Tonight I'll Be Staying Here with You" (Dylan) – 2:48
11. "Travelin' Man" (Fuller) – 2:09
12. "She Belongs to Me" (Dylan) – 2:50
13. "Poor Little Fool" (Sheeley) – 2:20
14. "I Think It's Going To Rain Today" (Randy Newman) – 3:18
15. "Believe What You Say" (D. Burnette, J. Burnette) – 2:04
16. "Who Cares About Tomorrow/Promises" (Nelson) – 5:36
17. "Lady Came From Baltimore" (Hardin) – 2:16
18. "Violets of Dawn" (Eric Andersen) – 3:25
19. "It's Late" (Dorsey Burnette) – 2:10
20. "If You Gotta Go, Go Now" (Dylan) – 3:18

All tracks on disc two are newly mixed alternate performances from the 1969 Troubadour shows.

== Personnel ==
- Rick Nelson - rhythm guitar, vocals
- Randy Meisner - bass guitar, vocals
- Allen Kemp - lead guitar, vocals
- Tom Brumley - steel guitar
- Patrick Shanahan - drums

== Production ==
- Producer: Rick Nelson, Randy Meisner [Joe Sutton, Rick's manager at the time, was also credited]
- Production coordination: John Walsh
- Art Direction: Unknown
- Photography: Bill Levy
- Liner notes: Eric Andersen
