= Waitin' in School =

Single by Ricky Nelson
- A-side: "Stood Up"
- Released: December 9, 1957
- Genre: Rock and roll, Rockabilly
- Length: 2:02
- Label: Imperial
- Songwriters: Johnny Burnette; Dorsey Burnette

Ricky Nelson singles chronology
| "Have I Told You Lately That I Love You?" / "Be-Bop Baby" (1957) | "Waitin' in School" (1957) | "My Bucket's Got a Hole in It" / "Believe What You Say" (1960 (1958)) |

"Waitin' in School" is a rock and roll song written by Johnny Burnette and Dorsey Burnette. The song was recorded by Ricky Nelson, and peaked at number 18 in the US Billboard Hot 100 of 1958. It is considered one of the best examples of Nelson's contributions to rockabilly. Joe Maphis provided the lead guitar and solo on this record.

== In popular culture ==
- Ricky Nelson performed the song in The Adventures of Ozzie and Harriet sitcom, episode "Picture in Rick's Notebook".
- Gary Shorelle performed the song in the film Pulp Fiction.

== Chart performance ==
| Chart (1958) | Peak position |
|---|---|
| US Billboard Hot 100 | 18 |
| US Billboard Hot Country Singles | 12 |
