= Intakes (Rick Nelson album) =

Studio album by Rick Nelson and The Stone Canyon Band
- Released: September 1977
- Genre: Country rock
- Length: 31:11
- Label: Epic
- Producer: Rick Nelson

Rick Nelson and The Stone Canyon Band chronology
Windfall (1974)	Intakes (1977)	Playing to Win (1981)

Singles from Intakes
- 1. "You Can't Dance" Released: September 1977; 2. "Gimme a Little Sign" Released: January 1978

Intakes is a country rock album by Rick Nelson and the Stone Canyon Band, released in September 1977. It was Nelson's only album released on the Epic Records label, and Nelson's twenty-second solo studio album overall. Dennis Larden was the arranger, while Nelson produced the album.

Real Gone Music label included the album in the 2012 The Complete Epic Recordings box set. Bear Family included also the album in the 2010 The Last Time Around box set.

== Background ==
Ricky Nelson wrote two songs himself that may have been inspired by his wife: "It's Another Day", about a deteriorating love affair, and "Something You Can't Buy", a song returning him to his rockabilly roots. Larden arranged the songs for the album and wrote "One X One" and "Wings."

== Reception ==
Professional ratings
Review scores
Source	Rating
AllMusic	2.5/5 stars
The Encyclopedia of Popular Music	2/5 stars
The Rolling Stone Album Guide	2/5 stars

Billboard described the album as "the most commercial effort from Nelson" saying "He moves successfully away from a countrified vocal vein into more a pop-oriented, fast paced fare with a few ballads sprinkled in."

Cashbox described the album as "a highly listenable sound album"

== Track listing ==
=== Side one ===
No.	Title	Writer(s)	Length
1.	"You Can't Dance"	Tim Ryan, Bob Yeomans	2;59
2.	"One X One"	Dennis Larden	3:35
3.	"I Wanna Move With You"	Baker Knight	3:30
4.	"It's Another Day"		3:11
5.	"Wings"	Dennis Larden	3:13

=== Side two ===
No.	Title	Writer(s)	Length
1.	"Five Minutes More"	Art DelGudico, Jay DeWitt White	2:46
2.	"Change Your Mind"	Jay DeWitt White	2:31
3.	"Something You Can't Buy"		2:48
4.	"Gimme a Little Sign"	Alfred Smith, Joe Hooven, Jerry Winn	3:06
5.	"Stay Young"	Benny Gallagher, Graham Lyle	3:32

== Personnel ==
- Ricky Nelson – guitar, lead vocals
- Dennis Larden – lead guitar, backing vocals
- Tom Brumley – steel guitar
- Jay DeWitt White – bass guitar, backing vocals
- Ty Grimes – drums
