= I'm So Lonesome I Could Cry =

Single by Hank Williams With His Drifting Cowboys
- A-side: "My Bucket's Got a Hole in It"
- Published: October 31, 1949 Acuff-Rose Publications
- Released: November 8, 1949
- Recorded: August 30, 1949
- Studio: Herzog Studio (Cincinnati)
- Genre: Hillbilly; honky-tonk
- Length: 2:48
- Label: MGM 10560
- Songwriter: Hank Williams

Hank Williams With His Drifting Cowboys singles chronology
"You're Gonna Change (Or I'm Gonna Leave)" (1949)	"I'm So Lonesome I Could Cry" (1949)	"I Just Don't Like This Kind of Living" (1950)

"I'm So Lonesome I Could Cry" is a song written and recorded by American country music singer-songwriter Hank Williams in 1949. The song has been covered by a wide range of musicians.

== Authorship and production ==
Various writers quoted Williams as saying he wrote the song originally intending the words be spoken rather than sung, as he had done on several of his Luke the Drifter recordings. According to Colin Escott's 2004 book: Hank Williams: A Biography, the inspiration for the song came from the title to a different song Williams spotted on a list of forthcoming MGM record releases. The song was recorded on August 30, 1949, at Herzog Studio in Cincinnati, Ohio.

Williams was backed by members of the Pleasant Valley Boys: Zeke Turner (lead guitar), Jerry Byrd (steel guitar) and Louis Innis (rhythm guitar), as well as Tommy Jackson (fiddle) and Ernie Newton (bass).

=== Controversy ===
Music journalist Chet Flippo and Kentucky historian W. Lynn Nickell have both asserted that 21-year-old Kentuckian Paul Gilley wrote the lyrics, then sold them to Williams along with the rights, allowing Williams to take credit for it. Gilley also supposedly wrote the lyrics to "Cold, Cold Heart" and other hit country songs before drowning at the age of 27. The claims have not been widely accepted.

== Release and reception ==
The song was released as the B-side to the blues "My Bucket's Got a Hole in It", because up-tempo numbers were deemed more appropriate for the jukebox trade than melancholy ballads. The single reached number four on the country chart in 1949.

"I'm So Lonesome I Could Cry" has been identified with Williams's musical legacy, and has been widely praised. In the 2003 documentary The Road to Nashville, singer k.d. lang stated: "I think 'I'm So Lonesome I Could Cry' is one of the most classic American songs ever written, truly. Beautiful song." In his autobiography, Bob Dylan recalled: "Even at a young age, I identified with him. I didn't have to experience anything that Hank did to know what he was singing about. I'd never heard a robin weep, but could imagine it and it made me sad." In its online biography of Williams, Rolling Stone notes:

In tracks like "I'm So Lonesome I Could Cry", Williams expressed intense, personal emotions with country's traditional plainspoken directness, a then-revolutionary approach that has come to define the genre through the works of subsequent artists from George Jones and Willie Nelson to Gram Parsons and Dwight Yoakam.

Rolling Stone ranked it number 111 on their list of the 500 Greatest Songs of All Time, the oldest song on the list, and number 3 on its 100 Greatest Country Songs of All Time. In June 2026, CBS News included the song in its list of the 250 essential American songs of the past 250 years.

== Notable cover versions ==
Many musical artists have covered the song:

- Johnny Cash covered the song on his 1960 album Now, There Was a Song!. Cash covered the song again on his 2002 album American IV: The Man Comes Around, this time as a duet with Nick Cave.
- Johnny Tillotson reached number 89 on the American Billboard charts in 1962.
- The Everly Brothers released their version on the 1963 album The Everly Brothers Sing Great Country Hits.
- Among the most notable is a version by B. J. Thomas and the Triumphs, who took the song to number 8 on the Billboard Hot 100 in 1966 and number 2 in Canada.
- In 1972, Charlie McCoy's version charted at number 23 on Billboard's Hot Country Songs chart and number 21 in Canada.
- Leon Russell released a version in 1973, which brought him a modest hit at number 78 on the Hot 100.
- Al Green released a cover on his 1973 album Call Me.
- Elvis Presley covered the song as part of his 1973 TV special Aloha from Hawaii via Satellite and the resulting live album, notably describing it as "probably the saddest song [he'd] ever heard".
- Pittsburgh Steelers quarterback Terry Bradshaw recorded the song in 1975 and released it in 1976; it reached number 17 on the country singles chart for two weeks and also number 17 in Canada. It broke into the Hot 100 at number 91.
- Jerry Lee Lewis released a cover in 1982, peaking at number 43 on the Hot Country Songs chart.
- Stephan Eicher released a cover in 1991, on a music by Johann-Sebastian Bach on the album "Engelberg".
- Volbeat released a heavy metal cover of the song on their 2008 album Guitar Gangsters & Cadillac Blood.
- Yo La Tengo released a cover on their 2015 album Stuff Like That There.
- Sam Williams, Hank Williams' grandson, released his cover on September 15, 2023; two days before what would have been his grandfather's 100th birthday.

== Chart performance ==
=== Hank Williams version ===
Year	Chart	Position
1949	Billboard Country Singles	B-side of "My Bucket's Got a Hole in It"
1966	Billboard Country Singles	No. 43

Williams' version ranked No. 29 in CMT's 100 Greatest Songs in Country Music in 2003.

== Sources ==
- Escott, Colin; Merritt, George; MacEwen, William (2004). Hank Williams: The Biography. New York: Little, Brown.
