= Life (Ricky Nelson song) =

Single by Rick Nelson & The Stone Canyon Band

from the album Rudy the Fifth
- B-side: "California"
- Released: January 30, 1971
- Genre: Rock
- Length: 2:58
- Label: Decca Records 32779
- Songwriter: Ricky Nelson
- Producer: Ricky Nelson

Rick Nelson & The Stone Canyon Band singles chronology
"How Long" (1970)	"Life" (1971)	"Garden Party" (1972)

"Life" is a song written and produced by Ricky Nelson and performed by Rick Nelson & The Stone Canyon Band. The song reached No. 15 on the easy listening chart and No. 109 on the Billboard Hot 100 Bubbling Under chart in 1971.

The song is featured on his 1971 album, Rudy the Fifth.
