= Spotlight on Rick =

Studio album by Rick Nelson
- Released: November 23, 1964
- Genre: Rock and roll
- Length: 28:00
- Label: Decca
- Producer: Charles "Bud" Dant

Rick Nelson chronology
| The Very Thought of You (1964) | Spotlight on Rick (1964) | Best Always (1965) |

Singles from Spotlight on Rick
- 1. "A Happy Guy" Released: November 9, 1964

Spotlight on Rick is the eleventh studio album by rock and roll and pop idol Rick Nelson and his fourth for Decca Records, released on November 23, 1964.

The album was released on compact disc by Ace Records on December 9, 1997, as tracks 13 through 24 on a pairing of two albums on one CD with tracks 1 through 12 consisting of Nelson's 1964 album, The Very Thought of You. Bear Family included the album in the 2008 For You: The Decca Years box set.

== Content ==
The track, "A Happy Guy", was released as a single backed by "Don't Breathe a Word" two weeks before the album's release. The single saw some commercial success, peaking at number 82 on the Billboard Hot 100. It also reached number 83 on the Cashbox singles chart. The album itself features the early recording of "I'm a Fool" (which would later be a hit for Dino, Desi & Billy the following year) and a cover of Chuck Berry "I'm Talking About You", (which he would re-record it on his album Garden Party 8 years later). Jimmie Haskell arranged the album and Charles "Bud" Dant produced it.

== Chart performance ==
The album debuted on the Cashbox looking ahead albums chart in the issue dated January 16, 1965, and remained on the chart for four weeks, peaking at number 107. It debuted on the Record World looking ahead albums chart in the issue dated January 9, 1965, and remained on the chart for five weeks, reaching number 108.

== Reception ==
Professional ratings
Review scores
| Source | Rating |
|---|---|
| AllMusic | 3/5 stars |
| The Encyclopedia of Popular Music | 2/5 stars |
| Record Mirror | 3/5 stars |

The album was met with a positive critical reception upon its release. Billboard selected the album for a "Spotlight Album" review, and stated that "his easy-going ballads and delivered in his usual winning style. The songs are teen-grooved". Cashbox stated his "distinctive wide range baritone voice and emotion-packed delivery carries him in good stead." Record World described the album as a "plain good listening". Variety praised Nelson for "his delivering his ballads with strong rock feeling and belting out the uptempo sides in a manner that should catch the teen beaters." Record Mirror said the album "features a contrast between tracks like 'I'm Talking About You' and 'From a Distance'".

Retrospectively, Richie Unterberger of AllMusic wrote that 'Nelson's mid-'60s albums would have seemed like far more respectable efforts had they been able to escape comparison with a fast-changing rock scene. which had some average contributions by above-average writers like Baker Knight and Jerry Fuller. An energetic stab at Chuck Berry's "I'm Talking About You," and a nice tune from the pen of ex-Cricket Sonny Curtis ("Don't Breathe a Word"), were mild highlights'. Both Record Mirror and AllMusic gave the album three-star ratings, while getting a lower two-star rating from The Encyclopedia of Popular Music, meaning that they believed that album was "flawed or lacking in some way."

== Track listing ==
=== Side one ===
| No. | Title | Writer(s) | Length |
|---|---|---|---|
| 1. | "I'm a Fool" | Joey Cooper, Red West | 1:57 |
| 2. | "I Tried" | Jerry Fuller | 2:43 |
| 3. | "I'm Talking About You" | Chuck Berry | 2:07 |
| 4. | "Yesterday's Love" | Baker Knight | 2:12 |
| 5. | "A Happy Guy" | Larry Kusik, Kenny Rankin | 2:15 |
| 6. | "From a Distance" | Johnny Bachelor | 3:00 |

=== Side two ===
| No. | Title | Writer(s) | Length |
|---|---|---|---|
| 1. | "Stop, Look, Listen" | Joy Byers | 2:11 |
| 2. | "Don't Breathe a Word" | Sonny Curtis | 2:08 |
| 3. | "That's Why I Love You Like I Do" | Charles Bene | 2:38 |
| 4. | "In My Dreams" | Chuck Fain, Dotty Harmony, James Smith, Cathy Temen | 2:25 |
| 5. | "Just Relax" | Baker Knight | 2:04 |
| 6. | "Live and Learn" | Clyde Pitts | 2:20 |

== Charts ==
=== Album ===
| Chart (1965) | Peak position |
|---|---|
| US Cashbox Looking Ahead Albums | 107 |
| US Record World Looking Ahead LP's | 108 |

=== Singles ===
| Year | Title | U.S. Hot 100 | U.S Cashbox |
|---|---|---|---|
| 1964 | A Happy Guy | 83 | 82 |
