= Songs by Ricky =

Studio album by Ricky Nelson
- Released: November 1959
- Genres: Rock and roll; rockabilly
- Length: 32:24
- Label: Imperial
- Producer: Charles "Bud" Dant

Ricky Nelson chronology
| Ricky Sings Again (1959) | Songs by Ricky (1959) | Ricky Sings Spirituals (1960) |

Singles from Songs By Ricky
- 1. "Just a Little Too Much" Released: June 1959; 2. "A Long Vacation" Released: June 1963

Songs by Ricky is the fourth album by Ricky Nelson, released in November 1959 by Imperial Records. The Jordanaires provide vocal accompaniment, the last Nelson album on which they do so. It contains songs from the Burnettes, Baker Knight, and Nelson's uncle Don Nelson. Jimmie Haskell was the arranger, and Charles "Bud" Dant produced the album.

The album debuted on the Billboard Best Selling LPs chart in the issue dated September 29, 1959, remaining on the chart for 26 weeks and peaking at number 22. It reached number nine on the Cashbox albums chart during a 19-week stay on the chart. Successful singles from the album include "Just a Little Too Much" and "Sweeter Than You", both of which peaked at Number nine on the Billboard Hot 100 singles chart. They reached numbers 11 and 18, respectively, on the Cashbox Singles Chart and peaked at numbers 11 and 65 in the UK. "That's All" was issued as singles four years later to coincide with the release of the 1963 Imperial compilation Best Sellers by Rick Nelson, and entered the Hot 100 issue dated February 23, 1963, peaking at number 48 during its six-week stay. and number 53 on the Cashbox singles during its five-week stay. "A Long Vacation" was release as a single four months later in June 1963, to coincide with the release of the 1963 Imperial compilation A Long Vaction, spent four weeks on the Billboard Bubbling Under Hot 100 Singles chart in the issue dated June 29, 1963, peaking at number 120.

The album was released on compact disc by Capitol Records on June 19, 2001, paired with Ricky Sings Again. Bear Family included the album in the 2001 The American Dream box set.

== Reception ==
Professional ratings
Review scores
| Source | Rating |
|---|---|
| AllMusic | 4/5 stars |
| Disc | 5/5 stars |
| The Encyclopedia of Popular Music | 3/5 stars |

Variety wrote that "Nelson has a pleasant set of pipes which he uses well within the relatively narrow vocal and emotional range of songs".

Cashbox in its Popular Picks Of The Week reviews, describing the album as "Great teen merchandise".

Ken Graham of Disc described the album as "his finest work to date"

William Ruhlmann of AllMusic thought "The result was a consistent record by a writing and performing team at the peak of its powers, everyone contributing to an overall sound that was a rhythmic, smooth development on the kind of raw rockabilly invented in Memphis by the original artists at Sun Records. and Nelson had turned into a supple vocalist with a sure sense of the material."

== Track listing ==
=== Side one ===
| No. | Title | Writer(s) | Length |
|---|---|---|---|
| 1. | "You'll Never Know What You're Missing" | Baker Knight | 2:34 |
| 2. | "That's All" | Bob Haymes, Alan Brandt | 2:05 |
| 3. | "Just a Little Too Much" | Johnny Burnette | 2:12 |
| 4. | "One Minute to One" | Baker Knight | 2:05 |
| 5. | "Half Breed" | John D. Loudermilk | 2:05 |
| 6. | "You're So Fine" | Dorsey Burnette | 2:26 |

=== Side two ===
| No. | Title | Writer(s) | Length |
|---|---|---|---|
| 1. | "Don't Leave Me" | Johnny Burnette | 2:16 |
| 2. | "Sweeter Than You" | Baker Knight | 2:19 |
| 3. | "A Long Vacation" | Dorsey Burnette | 2:08 |
| 4. | "So Long" | Don Nelson | 2:01 |
| 5. | "Blood From a Stone" | Johnny Bachelor, Rupert Stephens | 2:12 |
| 6. | "I've Been Thinkin'" | Johnny Burnette | 2:06 |

== Charts ==
=== Album ===
| Chart (1959) | Peak position |
|---|---|
| U.S. Billboard Best Selling LPs (Billboard) | 22 |
| U.S. Cashbox | 9 |

=== Singles ===
| Year | Title | U.S. Hot 100 | U.S. Cashbox |
|---|---|---|---|
| 1959 | "Just a Little Too Much" | 9 | 11 |
| 1959 | "Sweeter Than You | 9 | 18 |
| 1963 | "That's All" | 48 | 53 |
| 1963 | "A Long Vaction | 120 | 107 |
