= You're My One and Only Love =

Single by Ricky Nelson
- B-side: "Honey Rock"
- Released: August 1957
- Genre: Rock and roll
- Length: 2:02
- Label: Verve
- Songwriters: Barney Kessel, Jack Marshall

Ricky Nelson singles chronology
"I'm Walkin'" / "A Teenager's Romance" (1957)	"You're My One and Only Love" (1957)	"Be-Bop Baby" (1957)

"You're My One and Only Love" is a song written by Barney Kessel and Jack Marshall, and originally performed by American musician Ricky Nelson. The song reached number 14 on the Billboard pop chart in 1957.

The single's B-side was "Honey Rock", written by Barney Kessel.

== Other versions ==
- Edna McGriff released a version in Australia as the B-side to her 1957 single, "And That Reminds Me".
