= Rick Sings Nelson =

Studio album by Rick Nelson and The Stone Canyon Band
- Released: 1970
- Recorded: 1970
- Genre: Country rock
- Length: 35:09
- Label: Decca/MCA
- Producer: Rick Nelson

Rick Nelson and The Stone Canyon Band chronology
In Concert at The Troubadour (1970)	Rick Sings Nelson (1970)	Rudy the Fifth (1971)

Rick Sings Nelson is the eighteenth studio album by Rick Nelson and the Stone Canyon Band. It was the first album on which Nelson wrote every song.

The album debuted on the Billboard Top LPs chart in the issue dated November 17, 1970, and remained on the chart for two weeks, peaking at number 196.

The album was later released on a compact disc, titled Rick Nelson & The Stone Canyon Band, by Beat Goes On on January 26, 1999. On this single compact disc Rick Sings Nelson (tracks 1 through 10) is paired with his 1971 album, Rudy the Fifth, (tracks 11 through 22). Bear Family Records also included the album in the 2010 box set, The Last Time Around .

The bass guitar player on the album, Tim Cetera, is the brother of musician Peter Cetera.

== Critical reception ==
Professional ratings
Review scores
Source	Rating
AllMusic	3/5 stars
The Encyclopedia of Popular Music	3/5 stars

The Encyclopedia of Popular Music called the album "accomplished", writing that it was part of "a series of strong, often underrated, albums".

Variety described the album as "an straight outstanding disk".

Billboard said that the album contains "a package of standout material."

== Track listing ==
All tracks composed by Rick Nelson.

1. "We've Got Such a Long Way to Go" – 3:57
2. "California" – 3:04
3. "Anytime" – 4:28
4. "Down Along the Bayou Country" – 2:10
5. "Sweet Mary" – 3:25
6. "Look at Mary" – 3:08
7. "The Reason Why" – 4:19
8. "Mr. Dolphin" – 3:40
9. "How Long" – 3:00
10. "My Woman" – 3:58

== Personnel ==
=== Musicians ===
- Rick Nelson – guitar, piano, lead vocals
- Allen Kemp – lead guitar, backing vocals
- Tim Cetera – bass guitar, backing vocals
- Tom Brumley – steel guitar
- Patrick Shanahan – drums

=== Production ===
- Producer: Rick Nelson
- Executive producer: John Walsh

== Charts ==
Chart (1970–1972)	Peak position
US Billboard Top LPs	196
Australian Albums (Kent Music Report)	33
