= Ricky Sings Again =

Studio album by Ricky Nelson
- Released: January 1959
- Recorded: 1958–1959
- Genre: Rock and roll; rockabilly
- Label: Imperial
- Producer: Charles "Bud" Dant

Ricky Nelson chronology
Ricky Nelson (1958)	Ricky Sings Again (1959)	Songs by Ricky (1959)

Singles from Ricky Sings Again
- 1. "Believe What You Say" Released: March 10, 1958; 2. "Lonesome Town" Released: August 29, 1958; 3. "It's Late" Released: February 9, 1959; 4. "Old Enough to Love" Released: April 1963

Ricky Sings Again is the third studio album by Ricky Nelson, released in January 1959 by Imperial Records. It features a group of songs from the Burnettes and Baker Knight, including covers of Elvis Presley and Hank Williams. The Jordanaires provide vocal accompaniment.

The album debuted on the Billboard Best Selling LPs chart in the issue dated February 2, 1959, remaining on the chart for 19 weeks and peaking at number 14. It debuted on the Cashbox albums chart in the issue dated January 10, 1959, and remained on the chart for in a total of 27 weeks, spending a week at number one. Five singles were released from the album: "Lonesome Town", "It's Late", "Never Be Anyone Else But You", "Believe What You Say" and "Old Enough to Love".

The album was released on compact disc by Capitol Records on June 19, 2001, as tracks 1 through 12 on a pairing of two albums on one disc with tracks 18 through 29 consisting of Nelson's other Imperial album from November 1959, Songs by Ricky. Bear Family included the album in the 2001 The American Dream box set. Ricky Sings Again was included in a box set entitled Four Classic Albums Plus Box Set, which contains all 4 of his studio albums, and was released on July 1, 2016.

== Reception ==
Professional ratings
Review scores
Source	Rating
AllMusic	3/5 stars
The Encyclopedia of Popular Music	2/5 stars
MusicHound Rock	5/5 stars

William Ruhlmann of AllMusic said that the album showed off Nelson's "much more confident vocals" but with more original songs and fewer covers, he "still sounded like a carbon copy of his betters." Ruhlmann concludes that Ricky Sings Again "did not live up to his star status."

Billboard notes "Nelson packs plenty of heart and sales savvy into his rendition of a group of teen-appeal tunes".

Cashbox described the songs from the album as "uptempo and ballad beat Nelson sessions".

Variety mentions "it pegged for the younger set with titles such as "Old Engough to Love", "Restless Kid", and "You Tear Me Up"

Gary Graff, & Daniel Durchholz of MusicHound Rock described the album as "one of the great, unheralded rock 'n' roll albums of the '50s", giving the album a five-star rating. while AllMusic gave the album a three-star rating. while getting a lower two-star rating from The Encyclopedia of Popular Music.

== Track listing ==
=== Side one ===
No.	Title	Writer(s)	Length
1.	"It's Late"	Dorsey Burnette	2:34
2.	"One of These Mornings"	Dorsey Burnette	1:54
3.	"Believe What You Say"	Dorsey Burnette, Johnny Burnette	2:05
4.	"Lonesome Town"	Baker Knight	2:14
5.	"Tryin' to Get to You"	Rose Marie McCoy, Charlie Singleton	2:15
6.	"Be True to Me"	James Kirkland, Nat Stuckey	2:23

=== Side two ===
No.	Title	Writer(s)	Length
1.	"Old Enough to Love"	Al Jones, Bill Jones, Merle Kilgore	2:17
2.	"Never Be Anyone Else But You"	Baker Knight	2:16
3.	"I Can't Help It (If I'm Still in Love with You)"	Hank Williams	2:20
4.	"You Tear Me Up"	Baker Knight	2:21
5.	"It's All in the Game"	Charles G. Dawes, Carl Sigman	1:58
6.	"Restless Kid"	Johnny Cash	1:57

== Charts ==
=== Album ===
Chart (1959)	Peak position
U.S. Billboard Best Selling LPs (Billboard)	14
U.S. Cashbox	1

=== Singles ===
Year	Title	US Hot 100	US Cashbox	UK Singles Chart
1958	"Believe What You Say"	4	12	—
1958	"Lonesome Town"	7	7	—
1959	"Never Be Anyone Else But You"	6	5	14
1959	"It's Late"	9	6	3
1963	"Old Enough to Love"	94	86	—
