= A Teenager's Romance =

1957 song performed by Ricky Nelson

Single by Ricky Nelson
- A-side: "I'm Walkin'"
- Released: April 27, 1957
- Genre: Rock and roll
- Length: 2:23
- Label: Verve
- Songwriter: David Stewart Gillam

Ricky Nelson singles chronology
"A Teenager's Romance" (1957)	"You're My One and Only Love" (1957)

"A Teenager's Romance" is a song written by Teddy Joe Gillum. The song was performed by American musician Ricky Nelson and was on a single with “ I’m Walking” . The song reached #2 on the Billboard Top 100 in 1957.

The song ranked No. 25 on Billboard magazine's Top 50 songs of 1957.
