= Rudy the Fifth =

Studio album by Rick Nelson and The Stone Canyon Band
- Released: November 1971
- Recorded: 1971
- Genre: Country rock
- Length: 38:51
- Label: Decca/MCA
- Producer: Rick Nelson

Rick Nelson and The Stone Canyon Band chronology
Rick Sings Nelson (1970)	Rudy the Fifth (1971)	Garden Party (1972)

Rudy the Fifth is a country rock album by Rick Nelson and the Stone Canyon Band, released on October 4, 1971, and Nelson's nineteenth solo and twentieth studio album overall.

The album contains original songs as well as self-penned compositions, including "The Last Time Around" and "Song for Kristin (which he played classical guitar with no overdubs), and covers such as Bob Dylan's "Just Like a Woman" and "Love Minus Zero/No Limit", The Rolling Stones' "Honky Tonk Women", and Shirley & Lee and Johnny Preston's "Feel So Good". It also featured Nelson playing piano on "Honky Tonk Woman". His close friend Kent McCord designed the cover.

Rudy the Fifth "bubbled under" the Top LPs & Tape chart for two weeks that began in the issue dated November 27, 1971, peaking at number 204.

The album was released on compact disc for the first time by Beat Goes On on January 26, 1999, as tracks 11 through 23 on a pairing of two albums on one CD with tracks 1 through 10 consisting of Nelson's 1970 album, Rick Sings Nelson. Bear Family included also the album in the 2010 The Last Time Around box set.

== Reception ==
Professional ratings
Review scores
Source	Rating
AllMusic	3/5 stars
Christgau's Record Guide	B−
The Encyclopedia of Popular Music	3/5 stars

Billboard gave a positive review, describing the album as "folk-rock"

Dafydd Ress described the album as "one of [Nelson's] best."

== Track listing ==
All tracks composed by Rick Nelson, except where indicated.

1. "This Train" – 2:34
2. "Just Like a Woman" (Bob Dylan) – 4:58
3. "Sing Me a Song" – 3:21
4. "The Last Time Around" – 4:21
5. "Song for Kristin" – 1:14
6. "Honky Tonk Woman" (Mick Jagger, Keith Richards) – 4:11
7. "Feel So Good" (Leonard Lee) – 2:59
8. "Life" – 2:57
9. "Thank You Lord" – 4:00
10. "Song for Kristin" – 1:15
11. "Love Minus Zero/No Limit" (Dylan) – 2:55
12. "Gypsy Pilot" – 4:06

== Personnel ==
=== Musicians ===
- Ricky Nelson – guitar, piano, lead vocals
- Allen Kemp – lead guitar, backing vocals
- Randy Meisner – bass guitar, backing vocals
- Tom Brumley – steel guitar
- Patrick Shanahan – drums
- Andy Belling – piano

=== Production ===
- Producer: Rick Nelson
- Recording engineer: Michael "Nemo" Shields
- Photography: Kent McCord
- Artistic design: John C. Leprevost

== Charts ==
Chart (1971–1972)	Peak position
US Billboard Top LPs	204
Australian Albums (Kent Music Report)	38
