= Be-Bop Baby =

Single by Ricky Nelson

from the album Ricky
- B-side: "Have I Told You Lately That I Love You?"
- Released: September 16, 1957
- Genre: Rock and roll
- Length: 2:00
- Label: Imperial X5643
- Songwriter(s): Pearl Lendhurst

Ricky Nelson singles chronology
"You're My One and Only Love" (1957)	"Be-Bop Baby" (1957)	"Stood Up" (1957)

"Be-Bop Baby" is a song written by Pearl Lendhurst and performed by American musician Ricky Nelson. The song reached No. 3 on the Billboard pop chart and No. 5 on the R&B chart in 1957. The song appears on his 1957 album, Ricky. Joe Maphis was the lead guitar on this recording.

The song ranked No. 42 on Billboard magazine's Top 50 songs of 1957.

Rockabilly musician Autry Inman also recorded the song.
