= I Got a Feeling (Ricky Nelson song) =

Single by Ricky Nelson
- B-side: "Lonesome Town"
- Released: August 29, 1958
- Genre: Rock and roll
- Length: 2:03
- Label: Imperial
- Songwriter(s): Baker Knight

Ricky Nelson singles chronology
"Poor Little Fool" (1958)	"I Got a Feeling" (1958)	"It's Late" / "Never Be Anyone Else But You" (1959)

"I Got a Feeling" is a song written by Baker Knight and recorded by Ricky Nelson. The song reached No. 10 on the Billboard Hot 100 and No. 27 on the UK Singles Chart in 1958.

The song is ranked No. 67 on Billboard magazine's Top 100 Songs of 1958.
