= The Memphis Sessions (Rick Nelson album) =

Studio album by Rick Nelson
- Released: May 1986
- Genres: Rock and roll, rockabilly
- Length: 29:29
- Label: Epic
- Producer: Steve Buckingham

Rick Nelson chronology
| All My Best (1985) | The Memphis Sessions (1986) |

Singles from The Memphis Sessions
- 1. "Dream Lover"" Released: May 1986

The Memphis Sessions is American musician Rick Nelson's final studio album. It was released posthumously in May 1986. Nelson recorded it in 1978–79 in Memphis, Tennessee. A few months after Nelson's death, CBS hired Nashville producer Steve Buckingham to replace the original drum and lead guitar tracks and remix the material. Guitar player John Beland thought that the record label ruined Nelson's material.

The Real Gone Music label included the album in the 2012 The Complete Epic Recordings 2 CD set. Bear Family included the album in the 2010 The Last Time Around box set.

The album charted for four weeks on the Billboard Top Country Albums, peaking at No. 62.

== Critical reception ==
Professional ratings
Review scores
| Source | Rating |
|---|---|
| AllMusic | 3/5 stars |
| The Encyclopedia of Popular Music | 3/5 stars |
| The Rolling Stone Album Guide | 4/5 stars |

Billboard gave the album a positive review, saying that "these recordings from 1978-79 show off Nelson's rockabilly and '60s-rock leanings." Cashbox gave the album a positive review, saying that it features "a compilation of favorites, including 'True Love Ways', 'Send Me Somebody to Love', [and] 'Sleep Tight, Good Night Man'".

The Chicago Times wrote: "The result transforms inspired work that no doubt would have excited Nelson fans into a package that should delight anybody who enjoys classic rock and roll, heartfelt vocal work and good music-making. Buckingham's technique brings Nelson's voice out front as never before." The Ottawa Citizen opined that "Nelson's vocals have never sounded better on such rockabilly songs as 'Rave On' and 'That's All Right Mama'." The Atlanta Journal-Constitution concluded that "the backing, some of which was added after Nelson's death, is uninspired."

== Track listing ==
Side one

| No. | Title | Writer(s) | Length |
|---|---|---|---|
| 1. | "That's All Right" | Arthur Crudup | 2:36 |
| 2. | "It's All Over Now" | Bobby Womack, Shirley Womack | 3:28 |
| 3. | "Dream Lover" | Bobby Darin | 3:12 |
| 4. | "Rave On" | West-Tilghman-Petty | 2:44 |
| 5. | "Sleep Tight, Good Night Man" | John Lorber, Jeff Silbar | 3:24 |

Side two

| No. | Title | Writer(s) | Length |
|---|---|---|---|
| 1. | "Almost Saturday Night" | John Fogerty | 2:42 |
| 2. | "Lay Back in the Arms of Someone" | Nicky Chinn, Mike Chapman | 3:04 |
| 3. | "Stuck in the Middle with You" | Gerry Rafferty, Joe Egan | 3:29 |
| 4. | "Send Me Somebody to Love" | Tim Krekel | 2:55 |
| 5. | "True Love Ways" | Buddy Holly, Norman Petty | 1:55 |

== Charts ==
| Chart (1986) | Peak position |
|---|---|
| US Top Country Albums (Billboard) | 62 |
