= Never Be Anyone Else But You =

Single by Ricky Nelson

from the album Ricky Sings Again
- A-side: "It's Late"
- Released: February 9, 1959
- Recorded: November 24, 1958
- Genre: Rock and roll
- Length: 2:15
- Label: Imperial
- Songwriter: Baker Knight

Ricky Nelson singles chronology
"Lonesome Town" / "I Got a Feeling" (1958)	"Never Be Anyone Else But You" (1959)	"Just a Little Too Much" / "Sweeter Than You" (1959)

"Never Be Anyone Else But You" is a song written by Baker Knight and recorded by Ricky Nelson with the vocal backing of the Jordanaires. The song reached #6 on the Billboard Hot 100 and #14 in the UK in 1959. It reached #3 in Norway. The song was featured on his 1959 album, Ricky Sings Again.

The song is ranked #42 on Billboard magazine's Top 100 songs of 1959.

In 2020, the song was featured in a commercial for Campbell's Chicken Noodle soup.

== Other versions ==
- Heidi Brühl released a version as a single in Germany in 1959 entitled "Wir werden uns finden". It was the B-side to "Immer, wenn du bei mir bist", which reached #37 on the charts.
- Ernie Sigley released a version as a single in Australia in 1959 as the B-side to "It's Late".
- Michael Cox sang the song on the show Oh Boy! in April 1959.
- Rocky Sharpe and the Replays released a version as a single in the United Kingdom in 1981. They performed the song on the television program Musikladen.
- Cliff Richard released a version originally on his limited release album Rock 'n' Roll Silver in 1983 and again the following year on The Rock Connection album.
- Emmylou Harris released a version as a single in 1990 that reached #92 on the country chart in Canada. It was featured on her 1990 album, Brand New Dance.
