= Rick Nelson Sings "For You" =

Studio album by Rick Nelson
- Released: December 9, 1963
- Genre: Rock and roll; rockabilly
- Length: 26:58
- Label: Decca
- Producer: Charles "Bud" Dant

Rick Nelson chronology
For Your Sweet Love (1963)	Rick Nelson Sings "For You" (1963)	The Very Thought of You (1964)

Singles from Rick Nelson Sings for You
- 1. "Fools Rush In (Where Angels Fear to Tread)" Released: September 1963; 2. "For You" Released: December 1963

Rick Nelson Sings "For You" is the ninth studio album by rock and roll and pop idol Rick Nelson and his second for Decca Records.

The album was released on December 9, 1963, and features the singles "Fools Rush In (Where Angels Fear to Tread)" (which peaked at No. 12 in the US, US Cashbox and the UK) and "For You", the latter reached No. 6 on the Billboard Hot 100, No. 8 on the Cashbox, and No. 14 in the UK in January 1964. Nelson's version of the song was his last top ten hit for eight years before the British Invasion hit the U.S. when the Beatles arrived one month later on February 7, 1964.

The album debuted on the Billboard Top LPs chart in the issue dated January 4, 1964, and remained on the chart for 22 weeks, peaking at number 14. It also debuted on the Cashbox albums chart in the issue dated December 14, 1963, and remained on the chart for a total of 36 weeks, peaking at number 11.

The album was released on compact disc by Ace Records in 1997 as tracks 12 through 24 on a pairing of two albums on one CD with tracks 1 through 12 consisting of Nelson's debut Decca album, For Your Sweet Love. Bear Family included the album in the 2008 For You: The Decca Years box set.

== Reception ==
Professional ratings
Review scores
Source	Rating
AllMusic	3/5 stars
The Encyclopedia of Popular Music	3/5 stars
Record Mirror	3/5 stars
The Rolling Stone Album Guide	3/5 stars

Richie Unterberger thought the track "'Fools Rush In', with its classic James Burton guitar work, overshadowed everything else on Nelson's second Decca album".

Billboard selected the album for a "Spotlight Album" review, and stated that following hot on the heels of his current hit single, "Fools Rush In" is this designed to please young and old alike, and a generous serving of tunes to please the younger set such as "Hey There, Miss Tease" and "That's All She Wrote".

Cash Box claimed "Jack Haskell has created some stunning, imaginative arrangements for a fine batch of evergreens and newer material".

Variety praised Nelson for "His fine handing of such oldies as "For You", "Fools Rush In" and "The Nearness of You"

Record Mirror described the album as "a good pleasing listen".

The critics of Record Mirror, The Rolling Stone Album Guide, AllMusic, and The Encyclopedia of Popular Music each gave the album a three-star rating."

== Track listing ==
=== Side one ===
No.	Title	Writer(s)	Length
1.	"For You" (from the Fox Film picture: Billboard Girl)	Joe Burke, Al Dubin	2:15
2.	"Fools Rush In (Where Angels Fear to Tread)"	Johnny Mercer, Rube Bloom	2:31
3.	"Down Home"	Gerry Goffin, Carole King	2:40
4.	"That Same Old Feeling"	Jerry Crutchfield, Gerald Nelson	2:05
5.	"You're Free to Go"	Lou Herscher, Don Robertson	1:57
6.	"I Rise, I Fall"	Paul Hampton	2:14

=== Side two ===
No.	Title	Writer(s)	Length
1.	"That's All She Wrote"	Keith Colley, Nancie Mantz	2:09
2.	"(I'd Be) A Legend in My Time"	Don Gibson	2:32
3.	"Just Take a Moment"	Jerry Fuller, Cissi Wilson	2:07
4.	"Hello Mister Happiness"	Dave Burgess	2:07
5.	"Hey There, Little Miss Tease"	Jerry Fuller	2:15
6.	"The Nearness of You"	Hoagy Carmichael, Ned Washington	2:06

== Personnel ==
- Guitar: James Burton, Rick Nelson
- Bass: Joe Osborn
- Drums: Richie Frost
- Piano: Ray Johnson

== Charts ==
=== Album ===
Chart (1963)	Peak position
U.S. Top LPs (Billboard)	14
U.S. Cashbox	11

=== Singles ===
Year	Title	U.S. Hot 100	UK	U.S. AC	U.S. Cashbox
1963	"Fools Rush In (Where Angels Fear to Tread)"	12	12	—	12
1964	"For You"	6	14	1	8
