= Sweeter Than You =

Single by Ricky Nelson

from the album Songs by Ricky
- A-side: "Just a Little Too Much"
- Released: June 22, 1959
- Genre: Ballad
- Length: 2:17
- Label: Imperial
- Songwriter(s): Baker Knight

Ricky Nelson singles chronology
"It's Late" / "Never Be Anyone Else But You" (1959)	"Sweeter Than You" (1959)	"I Wanna Be Loved" / "Mighty Good" (1959)

"Sweeter Than You" is a song written by Baker Knight and performed by Ricky Nelson. The song reached #9 on the Billboard Hot 100 and #19 in the UK Singles Chart in 1959. The song was featured on his 1959 album, Songs by Ricky.

The song is ranked No. 83 on Billboard magazine's Top 100 songs of 1959.

== Other versions ==
- The Four Pennies released a version as part of an EP in the United Kingdom in 1965.
- Crippled Black Phoenix released a version as the opener to their album "White Light Generator" in 2014

== In media ==
- Nelson's version was featured on season 1, episode 14 of the show Cold Case entitled "The Boy in the Box".
