= Just a Little Too Much =

Single by Ricky Nelson

from the album Songs by Ricky
- A-side: "Sweeter Than You"
- Released: June 22, 1959
- Genre: Rock and roll
- Length: 2:10
- Label: Imperial
- Songwriter(s): Johnny Burnette

Ricky Nelson singles chronology
"It's Late" / "Never Be Anyone Else But You" (1959)	"Just a Little Too Much" (1959)	"I Wanna Be Loved" / "Mighty Good" (1959)

"Just a Little Too Much" is a song written by Johnny Burnette and performed by Ricky Nelson. The song reached #9 on the Billboard Hot 100 and #11 in the UK in 1959. The song was featured on his 1959 album, Songs by Ricky.

The song is ranked No. 78 on Billboard magazine's Top 100 songs of 1959.

== Other versions ==
- Col Joye released a version as a single in Australia in 1964.
- Olivia Newton-John released a version as a single in 1972. It was featured on her 1972 album, Olivia.
- The Troggs released a version as a single in the United Kingdom in 1978.
- Mac Curtis released a version on his 1981 album, Truckabilly.
