= Believe What You Say =

Single by Ricky Nelson

from the album Ricky Sings Again
- A-side: "My Bucket's Got a Hole in It"
- Released: March 10, 1958
- Genre: Rock and roll
- Length: 2:04
- Label: Imperial Records 5503
- Songwriters: Dorsey Burnette, Johnny Burnette

Ricky Nelson singles chronology
"Stood Up" (1957)	"Believe What You Say" (1958)	"Poor Little Fool" (1958)

"Believe What You Say" is a song written by Dorsey Burnette and Johnny Burnette and performed by Ricky Nelson. The song reached No. 4 on the Billboard Hot 100, No. 6 on the R&B chart, and No. 10 on the country chart in 1958. The song appeared on his 1959 album, Ricky Sings Again, with additional backing vocals (the Imperial single 5503 did not have the backing vocals). The song also appeared on his 1970 album, In Concert at the Troubadour, 1969.

The Burnette brothers along with Joe Campbell sat on Nelson's home steps to get a meeting with him. Their persistence and their work impressed Nelson, and he agreed to record the song. This is the first recording that Nelson recorded with musicians James Burton, James Kirkland, Richie Frost, and Gene Garf as a unit, however Burton had played rhythm guitar on Nelson's previous single, "Waitin' in School" (backed with "Stood Up"), while Joe Maphis did the lead guitar on those tracks.

== Other versions ==
- Billy Burnette released a version of the song in 1976.
