= Lonesome Town =

1958 song by Ricky Nelson

Single by Ricky Nelson

from the album Ricky Sings Again
- A-side: "I Got a Feeling"
- Released: August 29, 1958
- Studio: Harvard University
- Genre: Rock and roll
- Length: 2:17
- Label: Imperial
- Songwriter: Baker Knight

Ricky Nelson singles chronology
| "Poor Little Fool" (1958) | "Lonesome Town" (1958) | "It's Late" / "Never Be Anyone Else But You" (1959) |

"Lonesome Town" is a song written by Baker Knight. A version sung by Ricky Nelson became a hit single in the United States, reaching No. 7 on the Billboard Hot 100 and No. 15 on the R&B chart in 1958. The song was featured on his 1959 album, Ricky Sings Again. Nelson is accompanied on the recording by the vocal quartet the Jordanaires.

== Other versions ==
- Johnny Tillotson recorded and released his version of this song in 1962.
- Paul McCartney recorded it for his 1999 album Run Devil Run. He also performed the song live alongside David Gilmour for a 1999 PETA fundraiser concert.
- The Ventures recorded at least two versions of this song, the first released in 1961 on their album The Ventures (subsequently mistitled on later CDs as Lonesome Road) and the second, new recording on their 1975 cassette-only album Hollywood Metal Dinamic Sound 3000.
- Jerry Garcia, guitarist for the Grateful Dead, recorded two versions during the 1974 sessions for his solo album Garcia. Neither version were included on the original release but both, one being acoustic, were included in the 2004 box set All Good Things: Jerry Garcia Studio Sessions.
- The song was covered by the psychobilly band The Cramps on the EP Gravest Hits and also featured on compilations Off the Bone and How to Make a Monster.
- Australian singer Jason Donovan recorded it for his album Let It Be Me (2008).
- Milton Mapes recorded a cover version for the covers compilation soundtrack released in support of video game Stubbs the Zombie in 2005.
- The song was covered and released as single by English garage legend Holly Golightly. The song also appears on Singles Round-Up.
- The song was covered by Portuguese rocker Legendary Tiger Man with Rita Redshoes on vocals on his 2009 album Femina.
- The song was covered by Tom Petty and Bob Dylan on their Live on Air / Radio Broadcast 1986 Live album.
- Françoise Hardy recorded a version in French, La Rue des cœurs perdus in 1968.
- Richard Hawley recorded it as a b-side for his 2008 single "Valentine".

== In media ==
- The song appears on the soundtrack to the film Pulp Fiction. The song is played as characters Mia and Vincent begin their conversation in the restaurant.
- The song was used on the NBC television series Heroes in chapter 14 of the fourth season, in the episode "Close to You", which aired January 11, 2010.
- The song was used in Episode 4 of the Netflix series The End of the F***ing World.
- The song was used in the trailer for the Hulu series Castle Rock.
- The song is used in the beginning of Grantchester season 7 episode 3 on PBS.
- The song is used in Will Gowling’s play The Model.
- The song was used in the NBC television Series "Crossing Jordan" in season 2, episode 8 "Don't Look Back."
