= Ricky Nelson (album) =

Studio album by Ricky Nelson
- Released: July 1958
- Genres: Rock and roll; rockabilly
- Label: Imperial
- Producer: Charles "Bud" Dant

Ricky Nelson chronology
Ricky (1957)	Ricky Nelson (1958)	Ricky Sings Again (1959)

Singles from Ricky Nelson
- 1. "Poor Little Fool" Released: June 23, 1958; 2. "I'm in Love Again" Released: February 1963

Ricky Nelson is the second studio album by American singer Ricky Nelson, released in July 1958 by Imperial Records.

The album features of then-recent hits and older songs updated for his style, including a cover of Bobby Lee Trammell "Shirley Lee", Little Walter's "My Babe", "Unchained Melody", Fats Domino's "I'm in Love Again", and Roy Orbison's "Down the Line" it also contained Ricky Nelson's first composition, "Don't Leave Me This Way", The Jordanaires provide backing vocals.

The album debuted on the Billboard Top Pop Albums chart in the issue dated July 28, 1958, and remained on the chart for nine weeks, peaking at number 7. It debuted on the Cashbox albums chart in the issue dated June 21, 1958, and remained on the chart for 13 weeks, peaking at number 4.. The album was also issued simultaneously on three 4-song EPs, entitled Someday, Down The Line and Unchained Melody.

The singles from the album, "Poor Little Fool" became the first number-one song on Billboard magazine's then-new Hot 100 chart, in the issue dated July 7 1958, eventually spending two weeks at number one during its 15-week stay. on the Cashbox singles weeks it spent one week at number two during its 15-week stay. and number four in The U.K during its 14-week stay. "I'm in Love Again" was issued as a single 5 years later to coincide with the release of the 1963 Imperial compilation Best Sellers by Rick Nelson, and entered the Hot 100 issue dated February 23, 1963, peaking at number 67 during its six-week stay. and number 51 on the Cashbox singles during its six-week stay.

The album was released on compact disc by Capitol Records on June 19, 2001, as tracks 16 through 27 on a pairing of two albums on one CD with tracks 1 through 12 consisting of Nelson's debut studio album Ricky. Bear Family included also the album in the 2001 The American Dream box set. Ricky Nelson was included in a box set entitled Four Classic Albums Plus Box Set, which contains all 4 of his studio albums, and was released on July 1, 2016.

== Reception ==
Professional ratings
Review scores
Source	Rating
AllMusic	4/5 stars
Disc	3/5 stars
The Encyclopedia of Popular Music	2/5 stars

A review by AllMusic said that Ricky Nelson "remained a slavish imitator of the Sun Records rockabilly style on his sophomore long-player, but he had improved enormously in the endeavor", and gave the album a positive rating.

Ken Graham of Disc described the album as "entertaining"

== Track listing ==
1. "Shirley Lee" (Bobby Lee Trammell) – 2:00
2. "Someday (You'll Want Me to Want You)" (Jimmie Hodges) – 2:51
3. "There's Good Rockin' Tonight" (Roy Brown) – 1:50
4. "I'm Feelin' Sorry" (Jack Clement) – 2:19
5. "Down the Line" (Roy Orbison, Phillips) – 2:33
6. "Unchained Melody" (Alex North, Hy Zaret) – 2:21
7. "I'm in Love Again" (Dave Bartholomew, Fats Domino) – 2:20
8. "Don't Leave Me This Way" (Ricky Nelson) – 2:29
9. "My Babe" (Willie Dixon) – 2:33
10. "I'll Walk Alone" (Sammy Cahn, Jule Styne) – 2:39
11. "There Goes My Baby" (James Burton, James Kirkland) – 2:15
12. "Poor Little Fool" (Sharon Sheeley) – 2:33

== Charts ==
=== Album ===
Chart (1958)	Peak position
U.S. Billboard Best Selling LPs (Billboard)	7
U.S. Cashbox	4

=== Singles ===
Year	Title	U.S. Hot 100	U.S. Cashbox	U.K. Singles Chart
1958	"Poor Little Fool"	1	2	4
1963	"I'm in Love Again"	67	51	—
