= It's Late (Ricky Nelson song) =

1959 song performed by Ricky Nelson

Single by Ricky Nelson

from the album Ricky Sings Again
- A-side: "Never Be Anyone Else But You"
- Released: February 9, 1959
- Genre: Rock and roll
- Length: 1:57
- Label: Imperial X5565
- Songwriter(s): Dorsey Burnette

Ricky Nelson singles chronology
"Lonesome Town" / "I Got a Feeling" (1959)	"It's Late" (1959)	"Just a Little Too Much" / "Sweeter Than You" (1959)

"It's Late" is a song written by Dorsey Burnette, who recorded it on August 28, 1958. Released as a single by Ricky Nelson in February 1959, it subsequently reached number 3 in the UK, number 9 on the Billboard Hot 100, and number 30 on the R&B chart that year. The song is featured on the 1959 album Ricky Sings Again. It was re-released on a compilation album by Imperial Records in 1980.

"It's Late" is ranked number 74 on Billboard magazine's Top 100 songs of 1959.

== Charts ==
=== Weekly charts ===
Chart (1959)	Peak position
Australia (Kent Music Report)	28
UK Singles (OCC)	3
US Billboard Hot 100	9
US Hot R&B/Hip-Hop Songs (Billboard)	30
US Cash Box Top 100	6

=== Year-end charts ===
Chart (1959)	Position
US Billboard Hot 100	74

== Shakin' Stevens version ==
"It's Late"

Single by Shakin' Stevens

from the album The Bop Won't Stop
- B-side: "It's Good for You (Baby)"
- Released: 15 July 1983
- Recorded: 1983
- Studio: Eden Studios, London
- Genre: Rock and roll
- Length: 2:01
- Label: Epic
- Songwriter(s): Dorsey Burnette
- Producer(s): Christopher Neil

Shakin' Stevens singles chronology
"Your Ma Said You Cried in Your Sleep Last Night" (1983)	"It's Late" (1983)	"Cry Just a Little Bit" (1983)

In 1983 Shakin' Stevens recorded the song and released it as a single on the Epic Records label as the first single from his album The Bop Won't Stop. Some of the singles were issued as a novelty-shaped picture disk. It peaked at number 11 on the UK Singles Chart.

=== Charts ===
Chart (1983)	Peak position
Belgium (Ultratop 50 Flanders)	36
Denmark (Hitlisten)	4
Germany (GfK)	18
Ireland (IRMA)	3
UK Singles (OCC)	11
