= It's Up to You (Ricky Nelson song) =

Single by Rick Nelson

from the album It's Up to You
- B-side: "I Need You"
- Released: December 1962
- Genre: Pop
- Length: 2:30
- Label: Imperial Records 5901
- Songwriter: Jerry Fuller

Rick Nelson singles chronology
"Teen Age Idol" (1962)	"It's Up to You" (1962)	"I'm in Love Again" (1963)

"It's Up to You" is a song written by Jerry Fuller and performed by Ricky Nelson. The song reached No. 6 on the Billboard Hot 100, No. 4 on the easy listening chart, No. 24 on the R&B chart, and No. 22 in the UK Singles Chart in 1963. The single's B-side, "I Need You", reached No. 83 on the Billboard Hot 100. The song is featured on his 1962 album, It's Up to You.
