= Teen Age Idol =

Single by Rick Nelson
- B-side: "I've Got My Eyes on You (And I Like What I See)"
- Released: August 4, 1962
- Genre: Pop
- Length: 2:25
- Label: Imperial Records 5864
- Songwriter(s): Jack Lewis

Rick Nelson singles chronology
"Young World" / "Summertime" (1962)	"Teen Age Idol" (1962)	"It's Up to You" (1962)

"Teen Age Idol" is a song written by Jack Lewis and performed by Rick Nelson. The song reached No. 2 on the easy listening chart, No. 5 on the Billboard Hot 100, and No. 39 on the UK Singles Chart in 1962. The single's B-side, "I've Got My Eyes on You (And I Like What I See)", reached No. 105 on the Billboard singles chart.

The song is ranked No. 77 on Billboard magazine's Top 100 songs of 1962.

== Cover versions ==
- Jo Ann Campbell released a version as a single in New Zealand in 1962.
- Keith Moon released a version on his 1975 album, Two Sides of the Moon.
- Under the title L'idole des jeunes (1963), Teen age idol is one of French singer Johnny Hallyday's most famous singles.
- The Vandals covered the song for their 1991 album Fear of a Punk Planet.
- Zine covered the song in Occitan language for their 199_ album Cantates d'azur Under the title Miss Pantaï .
