= Stood Up (song) =

Single by Ricky Nelson
- B-side: "Waitin' in School"
- Released: December 9, 1957
- Genre: Rock and roll
- Length: 1:57
- Label: Imperial
- Songwriter(s): Dub Dickerson, Erma Herrold

Ricky Nelson singles chronology
"Be-Bop Baby" (1957)	"Stood Up" (1957)	"My Bucket's Got a Hole in It" / "Believe What You Say" (1958)

"Stood Up" is a song written by Dub Dickerson and Erma Herrold and performed by American musician Ricky Nelson. The song reached No. 2 on the Billboard pop chart, No. 4 on the R&B chart, No. 8 on the country chart, and No. 27 on the UK Singles Chart in 1957. James Burton and Joe Maphis played guitar on the song, with Joe Maphis doing the guitar solo.

The song ranked No. 16 on Billboard magazine's Top 50 songs of 1958.

== Other versions ==
- Willie Nile released a version on his 1997 album, Live in Central Park.
- Cliff Richard released a version on his 2013 album, The Fabulous Rock 'n' Roll Songbook.
