= My Bucket's Got a Hole in It =

Song written and composed by Clarence Williams

Single by Hank Williams With His Drifting Cowboys
- B-side: "I'm So Lonesome I Could Cry"
- Released: November 8, 1949
- Recorded: August 30, 1949
- Studio: Herzog Studio, Cincinnati
- Genre: Honky-tonk, blues, proto-rockabilly
- Length: 2:30
- Label: MGM 10560
- Songwriter: Clarence Williams

Hank Williams With His Drifting Cowboys singles chronology
"Mind Your Own Business" (1949)	"My Bucket's Got a Hole in It" (1949)	"I Just Don't Like This Kind of Living" (1949)

"My Bucket's Got a Hole in It" is a song widely attributed to Clarence Williams, who obtained a copyright in 1933, although the melody was recorded under various names years earlier. The song became popular performed by Hank Williams for MGM and reached number 4 on the country chart in 1949.

== Origins ==
A rendering (1927) by Tom Gates and his Orchestra (on Gennett 6184) as "The Bucket's Got A Hole In It" gives writing credit to musicians Lee Blevins and Victor Sells. This version predates the C. Williams copyright. The original melody evolved from the second theme of "Long Lost Blues" published in 1914 by J. Paul Wyer and H. Alf Kelley. The "Long Lost Blues" theme was a variation of "Bucket's Got a Hole in It", a motif that appears in several versions of "Keep A-Knockin". This tune later became the basis for several versions of the song, "You Can't Come In" recorded by multiple artists. However, "Bucket's Got a Hole in It" has also been attributed to Buddy Bolden, which would date it before 1906. As one critic noted, Hank Williams "could have been given this ditty to record, [but] he may have been familiar with this ditty from previous recordings or had heard it while growing up in Alabama."

== Tom Gates version ==
Tom Gates and his Orchestra performed the earliest known recording of this song on July 25, 1927 (Gennett 6198-A Champion 15307) in St. Paul, Minnesota as "The Bucket's Got a Hole in It." Band members included the composers, Lee N. Blevins on trombone and Victor Sells on trumpet. Also playing were Earl Clark, Frank Cloustier (piano, musical director), Bob Gates, Tom Gates, Tracy "Pug" Mama, Nevin Simmons (alto saxophone and vocals), and Harold Stoddard. Even in this early recording, the melody had already been used by the New Orleans Rhythm Kings in their "She's Crying For Me Blues" (1925 – Victor), also by Louis Dumaine's Jazzola Eight in 1927 as "To-Wa-Bac-A-Wa-Yale Blues".

== Washboard Sam version ==
Washboard Sam, aka Robert Brown, released a version of this song on Bluebird B-7906 known as "Bucket's Got A Hole In It." This recording was made in 1937 as one of "several historic blues recording sessions [that] took place on the top floor of the Leland Hotel located in downtown Aurora, Illinois. Lester Melrose, a freelance A&R man, and record producer, put together those recording sessions for the Bluebird label. Melrose brought together a small group of artists from St. Louis, and some of Chicago's finest blues artists of the time, and over the course of the next 20 months, recorded over 300 tracks. " Featured in this series of recordings are the performers Tampa Red, Washboard Sam, Big Bill Broonzy, Walter Davis, John Lee “Sonny Boy” Williamson, Big Joe Williams, Henry Townsend, Robert Lee McCoy, Speckled Red, Merlene Johnson, Addie “Sweet Peas” Spivey, Bill “Jazz” Gillum and One Arm Slim, amongst many others.

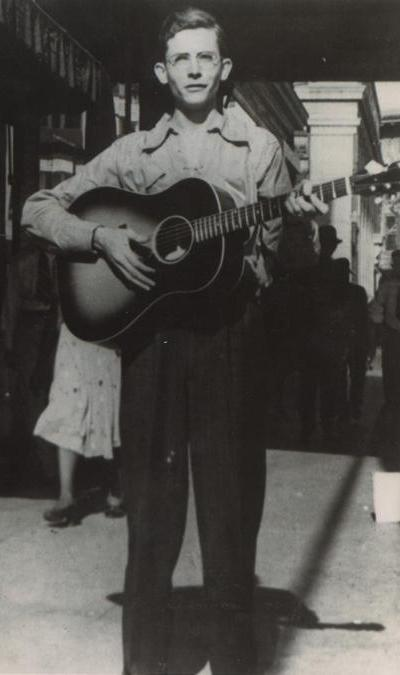
Hank Williams playing guitar in Montgomery, Alabama in 1938

== Hank Williams version ==
Williams likely first heard "My Bucket's Got a Hole in It" from Rufus Payne, nicknamed "Tee Tot," a black street singer who taught a young Hank to play blues guitar. In the essay to the 1990 Polygram box set Hank Williams: The Original Singles Collection, Colin Escott quotes Williams in an interview with Ralph Gleason in 1952: "I was shinin' shoes and sellin' newspapers and following this old Nigrah around to get him to teach me how to play the git-tar. I'd give him 15 cents or whatever I could get ahold of for a lesson." Understandably, producer Fred Rose was wary of the song's commercial potential; as country music historian Escott notes, "Fred Rose's opposition to the song had a lot to do with the fact that it mentioned beer, and probably had something to do with the fact that Acuff-Rose didn't publish it." In addition, Williams originally had a couplet mentioning a Ford automobile ("Me an' my baby, we got a Ford/Now we change the gears from the running board") and Rose demanded that, if Williams did record it, the reference be dropped because if Hank endorsed Ford, "then deejays sponsored by GM, Chrysler, and Studebaker wouldn't spin his record." Williams recorded the song on August 30, 1949, at Herzog Studio in Cincinnati, Ohio, (the same session that produced the B-side "I'm So Lonesome I Could Cry"). He is backed by members of the Pleasant Valley Boys — Zeke Turner (lead guitar), Jerry Byrd (steel guitar), and Louis Innis (rhythm guitar) — as well as Tommy Jackson (fiddle) and Ernie Newton (bass).

"My Bucket's Got a Hole in It" (Hank Williams version)
Hank Williams' 1949 recording of the song

The song is significant for featuring the only guitar solo Williams ever recorded:

"Hank came into the studio with the guitar solo already worked out. He played it twice as he demo'd it for the band, then reprised it on the record, and while it didn't break new ground, it was loose and swinging and wonderfully bluesy. The entire record had a compelling swing that showed just how deeply Hank was immersed in black music."

The blues influence is evident in other Williams songs, such as "Move It on Over," "Mind Your Own Business," and "Honky Tonk Blues," but "My Bucket's Got a Hole in It" remains the song that displays the influence most prominently.

== Other versions ==
- T. Texas Tyler covered the song for 4 Star Records in 1949. The song reached number 4 on the country chart.
- Fat Man Robinson recorded an R&B version for Decca that contained the lines relating to a Ford automobile that Williams had dropped from his version.
- Louis Armstrong recorded the song in 1950.
- Sonny Burgess released a version as a single in 1957.
- Ken Colyer's Jazzmen released a version as a single in 1956 in the United Kingdom.

"My Bucket's Got a Hole in It"

Single by Ricky Nelson
- B-side: "Believe What You Say"
- Released: March 10, 1958
- Genre: Rock and roll
- Length: 2:00
- Label: Imperial Records 5503
- Songwriter: Clarence Williams

Ricky Nelson singles chronology
"Stood Up" (1957)	"My Bucket's Got a Hole in It" (1958)	"Poor Little Fool" (1958)

- Ricky Nelson released a version of the song in 1958, backed by the Top-10 hit, "Believe What You Say". The song reached number 6 on the R&B chart, number 10 on the country chart, and number 12 on the Billboard Hot 100. Nelson substituted "I can't buy no beer" with "It don't work no more."
- Lefty Frizzell covered the song on his album The One and Only Lefty Frizzell released by Columbia in 1959.
- The Ramsey Lewis Trio released a version on their 1962 album, Country Meets the Blues.
- Bob Dylan and The Band recorded the song in 1967, released in 2014 on The Bootleg Series Vol. 11: The Basement Tapes Complete.
- Chris Spedding released a version as a single in 1975 in the United Kingdom.
- Andy Fairweather Low recorded his own version and it appeared on his 1975 album, La Booga Rooga.
- Jim Goad recorded a version on his 1997 album as Big Red Goad, Truck Drivin' Psycho.
- Page and Plant released a version on the 2001 compilation, Good Rockin' Tonight - The Legacy Of Sun Records.
- Troy Cassar-Daley covered the song on his album, Borrowed & Blue in 2004.
- Van Morrison released a version on his 2006 album, Pay the Devil.
- Willie Nelson and Wynton Marsalis released a version on their 2008 album, Two Men with the Blues.
- Tim Timebomb released a version in 2012.

== Sources ==
- Escott, Colin; Merritt, George; MacEwen, William (2004). Hank Williams: The Biography. New York: Little, Brown.
