= Baker Knight =

American musician (1933–2005)

- Born: Thomas Baker Knight Jr. July 4, 1933; Birmingham, Alabama, U.S.
- Died: October 12, 2005 (aged 72) Birmingham, Alabama, U.S.
- Occupations: Singer, songwriter
- Years active: 1956–1987
- Labels: Decca, Coral, RCA, Chess, Checker, Challenge, Jubilee, Everest, Reprise, Happy Tiger, Warner Bros.

Thomas Baker Knight Jr. (July 4, 1933 – October 12, 2005) was an American songwriter and musician. His best known compositions were "Lonesome Town", "The Wonder of You", and "Don't the Girls All Get Prettier at Closing Time". His songs have been recorded by Ricky Nelson, Paul McCartney, Dean Martin, The Cramps, Elvis Presley, Frank Sinatra, Perry Como, Mickey Gilley, Sammy Davis Jr. and Jerry Lee Lewis.

== Life and career ==
He was born in Birmingham, Alabama, to Thomas Baker Knight Sr. and his wife Mary (Obear) Knight. His father died in 1939 at the age of 32, and because of his mother's poor health Knight was raised mainly by relatives. He learned to play guitar while serving in the Air Force, and after his discharge entered the University of Alabama, where he wrote music in his spare time. In 1956 he founded a rockabilly group, Baker Knight and the Knightmares, with Shuler Brown (bass), A.D. Derby (keyboards), Bill Weinstein (drums), Glenn Lane (sax), and Nat Tortorici (sax). Their debut single, "Bop Boogie to the Blues", was released on Kit Records that year. The next release, "Bring My Cadillac Back", was a local hit and was picked up for national distribution by Decca Records, but radio stations refused to play it as it served as unpaid advertising for Cadillac cars. Decca held on to Knight and had him release three solo records featuring arrangements by Ray Ellis: "Reelin' and Rockin' (Bippin' and Boppin' Over You)", "Just a Little Bit More", and "Love-A Love-A Love-A". None sold well, and Decca dropped his contract soon afterwards.

Knight moved to Hollywood in 1958 in hopes of pursuing a career in acting, but was unsuccessful. He became friends with Eddie Cochran and Cochran's girlfriend, songwriter Sharon Sheeley, who had written "Poor Little Fool" for Ricky Nelson, and they helped him find work as a songwriter. Knight wrote "Lonesome Town", which became a hit for Nelson in 1958, as did the B-side, Knight's "I Got a Feeling". Nelson continued to record Knight's songs, many of which became hits, including "Never Be Anyone Else But You", "Sweeter Than You", and "I Wanna Be Loved". However, he refused to let Nelson record his tune "Just Relax", which he instead released himself as a solo single in 1959, with Cochran on guitar, for Coral Records. Neither this nor the next, "Pretty Little Girl", sold well and Coral dropped his contract.

Knight then wrote "The Wonder of You" for Perry Como, but Ray Peterson recorded it instead at the behest of Como's arranger Dick Peirce, and the song became a hit in both the U.S. and UK. Elvis Presley later recorded it with even greater success. Knight continued to record solo with RCA, Chess, Reprise, and Challenge, but never with much luck. He pursued his movie career, but he only appeared on screen once, in the 1966 B-movie, Swamp Country. He had a small part as a strolling minstrel and sang several of his own songs.

In 1966, Dean Martin picked up "Somewhere There's a Someone", the first of eleven of Knight's songs he would cover. Frank Sinatra recorded a handful of Knight tunes, including "Anytime at All". Knight also wrote psychedelic music for the West Coast Pop Art Experimental Band in the late 1960s.

In 1971, he teamed with producer Jimmy Bowen and singers Kim Carnes and Mike Settle to create the bubblegum pop studio group The Sugar Bears. An album, Presenting the Sugar Bears, and three singles were released with one song, Knight's "You Are The One", reaching #51 on the Billboard charts.

Knight turned to country music in the 1970s, writing songs for Ernest Ashworth, Hank Williams, Jr., Jerry Lee Lewis, Dave & Sugar, and Mickey Gilley, whose No. 1 hit "Don't the Girls All Get Prettier at Closing Time" won Knight the Academy of Country Music's Song of the Year in 1976.

In 1985, Knight returned to Birmingham, suffering from chronic fatigue syndrome and agoraphobia, and his output decreased considerably. In the 1990s, he set up his own home studio and self-released several solo albums through his website, including The Way I Hear It, Music Is My Woman, and Music for Romantic Dreamers, the last one all instrumental. Knight published a memoir entitled A Piece of the Big-Time (my songs - my success - my struggle for survival) in 2005 just before his death.

Thomas Baker Knight Jr. died in Birmingham, Alabama, in 2005 at the age of 72. He was survived by his daughter, singer-actress Tuesday Knight, and his son, Dr. Thomas Baker Knight III.

== Discography ==
=== Singles ===
Year	Title	Record Label
1956	"Bop Boogie To The Blues" / "Little Heart"	Kit 889/891
1956	"Bring My Cadillac Back" / "I Cried"	Kit SO 900/901
1956	"Bring My Cadillac Back" / "I Cried"	Decca 9–30135
1957	"Reelin’ and Rockin’" / "When The World Gets Around"	Decca 9–30213
1957	"Just A Little Bit More" / "The Value Of Love"	Decca 9–30306
1957	"Love-A-Love-A-Love-A" / "High School Days"	Decca 9–30426
1958	"Ain't Nothin' But Love" / "My Heart Cries for You"	Jubilee 45–5342
1958	"I Never Get To Kiss You Anymore" / "Wishing"	Jubilee 45–5357
1959	"Just Relax" / "Takin’ A Chance"	Coral 9–62132
1959	"Pretty Little Girl" / "Tag Along Blues"	Coral 9–62160
1959	"Sister" / "Peek-A-Boo"	Kick 713
1960	"I Can Tell" / "The Beginning Of The End"	RCA 47–7814
1961	"Dum Dum Diddley Dum" / "Any Time At All"	RCA 47-7892
1961	Theme From The Devil's Hand" / "Peek-A-Boo"	Chess 1795
1962	"Whose Little Baby Are You?" / "Bring It On Home To Me"	Kit 102
1962	"Hungry For Love" / "House Next Door"	Checker 1023
1963	"Best Thing That Ever Happened To Me" / "My Memories Of You"	Challenge 9214
1963	"Big City Girls" / "Look In The Mirror"	Everest 2033
1964	"Surrender To Me" / "When Somebody Mentions Your Name"	Challenge 59231
1964	"Apple Dandy" / "Good Evening Mr. Heartache"	Challenge 59260
1965	"(I'm A Sucker For A) Girl Like That" / "Hello Mama"	Challenge 59287
1965	"I’m The Wolf Man" / "Sit and Dance" (as "Round Robin")	Domain 1424
1966	"Man With A Plan" / "I Woke Up On The Wrong Side Of The World"	Reprise 0403
1966	"It Goes Deeper Than That" / "From A Distance"	Reprise 0448
1966	"Would You Believe It" / "Tomorrow's Good Time Girl"	Reprise 0465
1966	"I Want What You Got" / "Sorry ‘Bout That"	Reprise 0523
1967	"I Feel Sick About The Whole Thing" / "Hallucinations"	Reprise 0554
1967	"Things Are Looking Good (Out In Hollywood)" / "Stick-To-It-Ivity"	Reprise 0583
1968	"The Verge Of Success" / "Are You Satisfied Now?"	Reprise 0678
1970	"Lady Hamilton" / "Man Who Never Made It"	Happy Tiger HT-536
1975	"A Legend On The Stage" / same (mono)	Another ARDJ 1002
1977	"If Only" / "Physical Thing"	Warner Bros. WBS 8469
1987	"Those Songs Of Yesteryear" / same (mono)	Snug Harbor SNH-711-NSD

=== Albums ===
Year	Title	Record Label
2001	The Way I Hear It	Snug Harbor 701882
2001	Music For Romantic Dreamers	Snug Harbor 707022
2004	Music Is My Woman	Snug Harbor 707025

=== Compilations ===
Year	Title	Record Label
1992	High School Days (Germany)	Eagle 309013
2006	The Baker Knight Story (Spain)	America 5001
2011	Surrender To Me (internet release)	Red Bus
2011	The Very Best of Baker Knight	Master Classics

== External resources ==
- Label scans at www.45cat.com
- Discography at wangdangdula.com
- Sessionography and discography at Prague Frank's Country Music Discographies
