= Ricky Nelson =

American musician and actor (1940–1985)

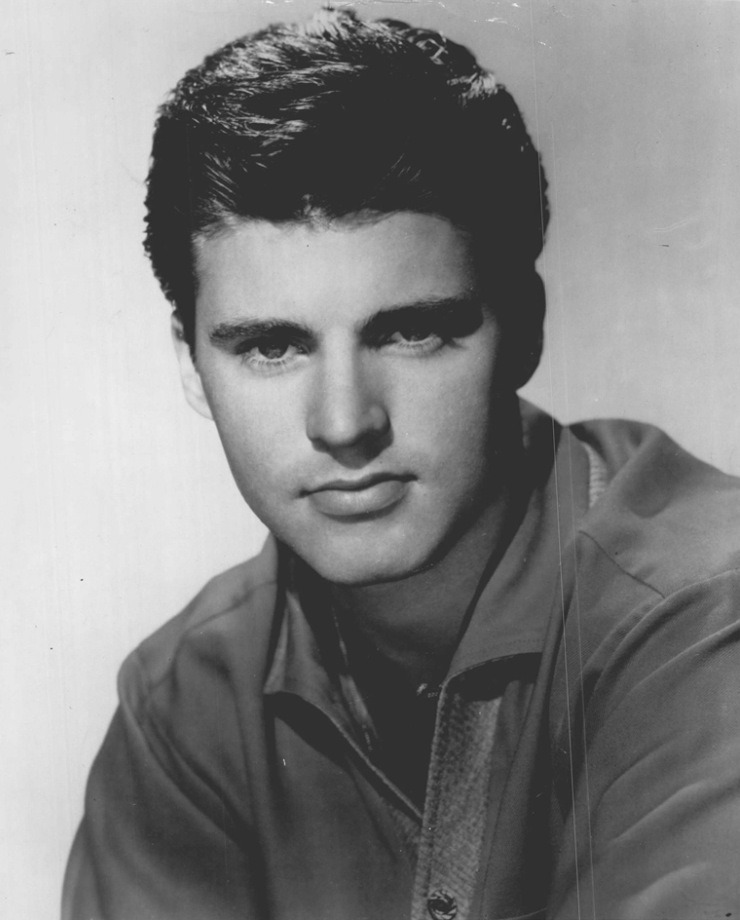
- Nelson in a publicity photo for Decca Records in 1966

Background information
- Also known as: Rick Nelson
- Born: Eric Hilliard Nelson; May 8, 1940; Teaneck, New Jersey, U.S.
- Died: December 31, 1985 (aged 45) De Kalb, Texas, U.S.
- Genres: Rockabilly; rock and roll; pop; country; country rock
- Occupations: Musician; songwriter; actor
- Years active: 1949–1985
- Labels: Verve; Imperial; London; Renown Records; Decca/MCA; Epic
- Website: rickynelson.com
- Spouse: Sharon Kristin Harmon (m. 1963; div. 1982)
- Children: 4, including Tracy, Matthew and Gunnar

Signature
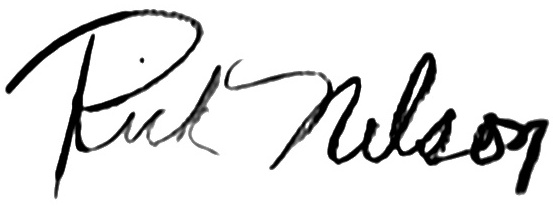

Eric Hilliard "Ricky" or "Rick" Nelson (May 8, 1940 – December 31, 1985) was an American musician and actor. From age eight, he starred alongside his family in the radio and television series The Adventures of Ozzie and Harriet. In 1957, he began a long and successful career as a popular recording artist.

His fame as both a recording artist and television star also led to a motion picture role co-starring alongside John Wayne, Dean Martin, Walter Brennan, and Angie Dickinson in Howard Hawks's western feature film Rio Bravo (1959). He placed 54 songs on the Billboard Hot 100 and its predecessors between 1957 and 1973, including "Poor Little Fool" in 1958, which was the first number one song on Billboard magazine's then-newly created Hot 100 chart. He recorded 17 additional top ten hits and was inducted into the Rock and Roll Hall of Fame on January 21, 1987. In 1996, Nelson was ranked No. 49 on TV Guide's 50 Greatest TV Stars of All Time.

Nelson began his entertainment career in 1949, playing himself in the radio sitcom series The Adventures of Ozzie and Harriet. In 1952, he appeared in his first feature film, Here Come the Nelsons. In 1957, he recorded his first single ("I'm Walkin'" b/w "A Teenager's Romance", Verve 10047X4S), debuted as a singer on the television version of the sitcom, and released the No. 1 album Ricky. In 1958, Nelson released his first No. 1 single, "Poor Little Fool", and in 1959 received a Golden Globe nomination for "Most Promising Male Newcomer" after starring in Rio Bravo. A few films followed, and when the television series was cancelled in 1966, Nelson made occasional appearances as a guest star on various television programs. In his twenties, he moved away from the pop music of his youth and began to perform in a country rock style after multiple straight country music albums. After recording several albums with mostly session musicians, most of which flopped, he formed the Stone Canyon Band in 1969 and experienced a career resurgence, buoyed by the live album In Concert at the Troubadour, 1969 and had a surprise hit with 1972's "Garden Party", which peaked at number six on the Billboard Hot 100. His comeback was short-lived, however, as his record label was bought out and folded, and his followup albums were not well promoted by his new label. He continued to perform live and take small television roles through the 1970s, though his label dropped him by the end of the decade. He released two more albums, with unimpressive results, before his death in a plane crash on New Year's Eve, 1985.

Nelson was married once, to Sharon Kristin Harmon, from 1963 until their divorce in 1982. They had four children: actress Tracy Nelson, twin sons and musicians Gunnar and Matthew, and actor Sam.

== Early life ==
Nelson was born on May 8, 1940, in Teaneck, New Jersey. He was the second son of entertainment couple Ozzie and Harriet Nelson. His father was of half-Swedish descent. The Nelsons' older son was actor David Nelson.

Harriet, normally the vocalist for Ozzie's band, remained in Englewood, New Jersey, with her newborn and toddler. Meanwhile, bandleader Ozzie toured with the Nelson orchestra. The Nelsons bought a two-story colonial house in Tenafly, New Jersey, and six months after the purchase moved with son David to Hollywood, where Ozzie and Harriet were slated to appear in the 1941–42 season of Red Skelton's The Raleigh Cigarette Hour; Ricky remained in Tenafly in the care of his paternal grandmother. In November 1941, the Nelsons bought what would become their permanent home: a green and white, two-story, Cape Cod colonial home at 1822 Camino Palmero in Los Angeles. Ricky joined his parents and brother there in 1942.

Ricky was a small and insecure child who suffered from severe asthma. At night, his sleep was eased with a vaporizer emitting tincture of evergreen. He was described by Red Skelton's producer John Guedel as "an odd little kid", likable, shy, introspective, mysterious, and inscrutable. When Skelton was drafted in 1944, Guedel crafted the radio sitcom The Adventures of Ozzie and Harriet for Ricky's parents. The show debuted on Sunday, October 8, 1944, to favorable reviews. Ozzie eventually became head writer for the show and based episodes on the fraternal exploits and enmity of his sons. The Nelson boys were first played in the radio series by professional child actors until twelve-year-old Dave and eight-year-old Ricky joined the show on February 20, 1949, in the episode "Invitation to Dinner".

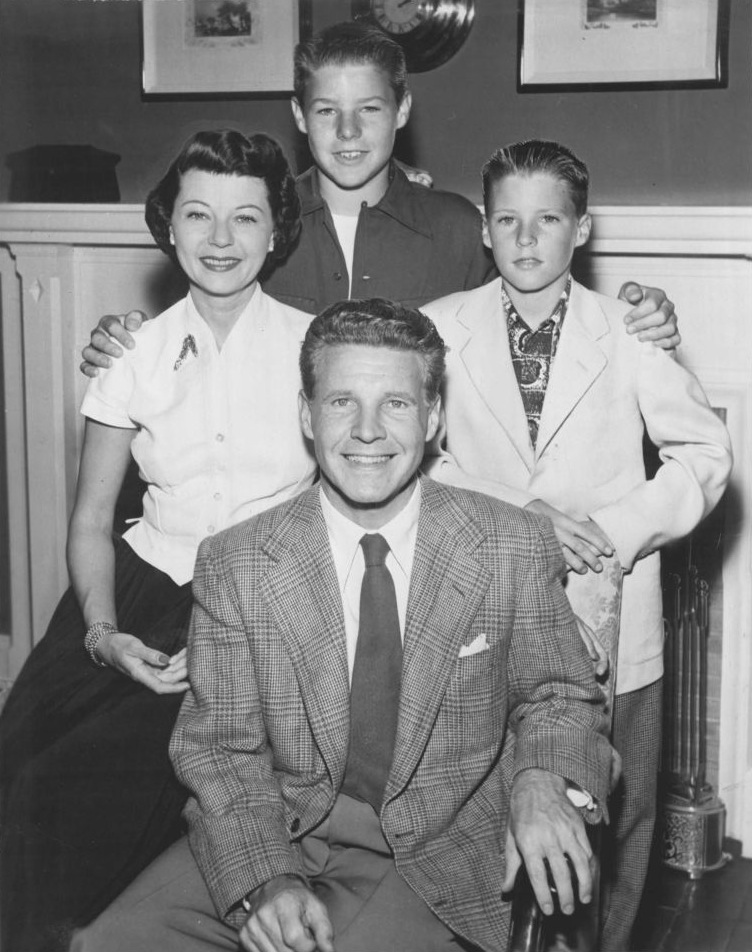
The Nelson family, 1952

In 1952, the Nelsons tested the waters for a television series with the theatrically released film Here Come the Nelsons. The film was a hit, and Ozzie was convinced the family could make the transition from radio's airwaves to television's small screen. On October 3, 1952, The Adventures of Ozzie and Harriet made its television debut and was broadcast in first run until September 3, 1966, to become one of the longest running sitcoms in television history.

== Education ==
Nelson attended Gardner Street Public School, Bancroft Junior High, and, between 1954 and 1958, Hollywood High School, from which he graduated with a B average. He played football at Hollywood High and represented the school in interscholastic tennis matches. Twenty-five years later, Nelson told the Los Angeles Weekly he hated school because it "smelled of pencils" and he was forced to rise early in the morning to attend. In January 1960, the athletic Nelson brothers formed a trapeze act with stunts in the 1/27/1960 episode of "Adventures of Ozzie and Harriet" titled 'THE CIRCUS'.

Ozzie Nelson was a Rutgers alumnus and keen on college education, but eighteen-year-old Ricky was already in the 93 percent income-tax bracket and saw no reason to attend. At age thirteen, Ricky was making over $100,000 per annum, and at sixteen he had a personal fortune of $500,000 (equivalent to $5,920,000 in 2025).

Nelson's wealth was astutely managed by his parents, who channeled his earnings into trust funds. Although his parents permitted him a $50 allowance at the age of eighteen, Ricky was often strapped for cash and one evening collected and redeemed empty pop bottles to gain entrance to a movie theater for himself and a date.

== Music career ==
=== Debut ===
Nelson played clarinet and drums in his tweens and early teens, learned the rudimentary guitar chords, and vocally imitated his favorite Sun Records rockabilly artists in the bathroom at home or in the showers at the Los Angeles Tennis Club. He was strongly influenced by the music of Carl Perkins and once said he tried to emulate the sound and the tone of the guitar break in Perkins's March 1956 Top Ten hit "Blue Suede Shoes".

At age sixteen, he wanted to impress his girlfriend of two years, Diana Osborn(e), who was an Elvis Presley fan and, although he had no record contract at the time, told her that he, too, was going to make a record. With his father's help, he secured a one-record deal with Verve Records, an important jazz label looking for a young and popular personality who could sing or be taught to sing. On March 26, 1957, he recorded the Fats Domino standard "I'm Walkin'" and "A Teenager's Romance" (released in late April 1957 as his first single), and "You're My One and Only Love".

Before the single was released, he made his television rock-and-roll debut on April 10, 1957, singing and playing the drums to "I'm Walkin'" in the Ozzie and Harriet episode "Ricky, the Drummer". About the same time, he made an unpaid public appearance, singing "Blue Moon of Kentucky" with The Four Preps at a Hamilton High School lunch-hour assembly in Los Angeles and was greeted by hordes of screaming teens who had seen the television episode.

"I'm Walkin'" reached No. 4 on Billboard's Best Sellers in Stores chart and its flip side, "A Teenager's Romance", hit No. 2. When the television series went on summer break in 1957, Nelson made his first road trip and played four state and county fairs in Ohio and Wisconsin with the Four Preps, who opened and closed for him.

=== First album, band, and No. 1 single ===
In early summer 1957, Ozzie Nelson pulled his son from Verve after disputes about royalties and signed him to a lucrative five-year deal with Imperial Records that gave him approval over song selection, sleeve artwork, and other production details. Ricky's first Imperial single, "Be-Bop Baby", generated 750,000 advance orders, sold over one million copies, and reached No. 3 on the charts. Nelson's first album, Ricky, was released in October 1957 and hit No. 1 before the end of the year. Following these successes, Nelson was given a more prominent role on the Ozzie and Harriet show and ended every two or three episodes with a musical number.

Nelson grew increasingly dissatisfied performing with older jazz and country session musicians, who were openly contemptuous of rock and roll. After his Ohio and Minnesota tours in the summer of 1957, he decided to form his own band with members closer to his age. Eighteen-year-old electric guitarist James Burton was the first signed. Bassist James Kirkland, drummer Richie Frost, and pianist Gene Garf completed the band. Their first recording together was "Believe What You Say". Prior to this, Joe Maphis had been playing the lead guitar part, and played lead on his first hits "Be-Bop Baby", "Stood Up", and "Waitin In School".

In 1958, Nelson recorded 17-year-old Sharon Sheeley's "Poor Little Fool" for his second album, Ricky Nelson, released in June 1958. Radio airplay brought the tune notice, and Imperial suggested releasing a single, but Nelson opposed the idea, believing a single would diminish EP sales. When a single was released nonetheless, he exercised his contractual right to approve any artwork and vetoed a picture sleeve. On August 4, 1958, "Poor Little Fool" became the No. 1 single on Billboard's newly instituted Hot 100 singles chart and sold over two million copies.

Nelson stated:

Anyone who knocks rock 'n' roll either doesn't understand it, or is prejudiced against it, or is just plain square. – NME – November 1958

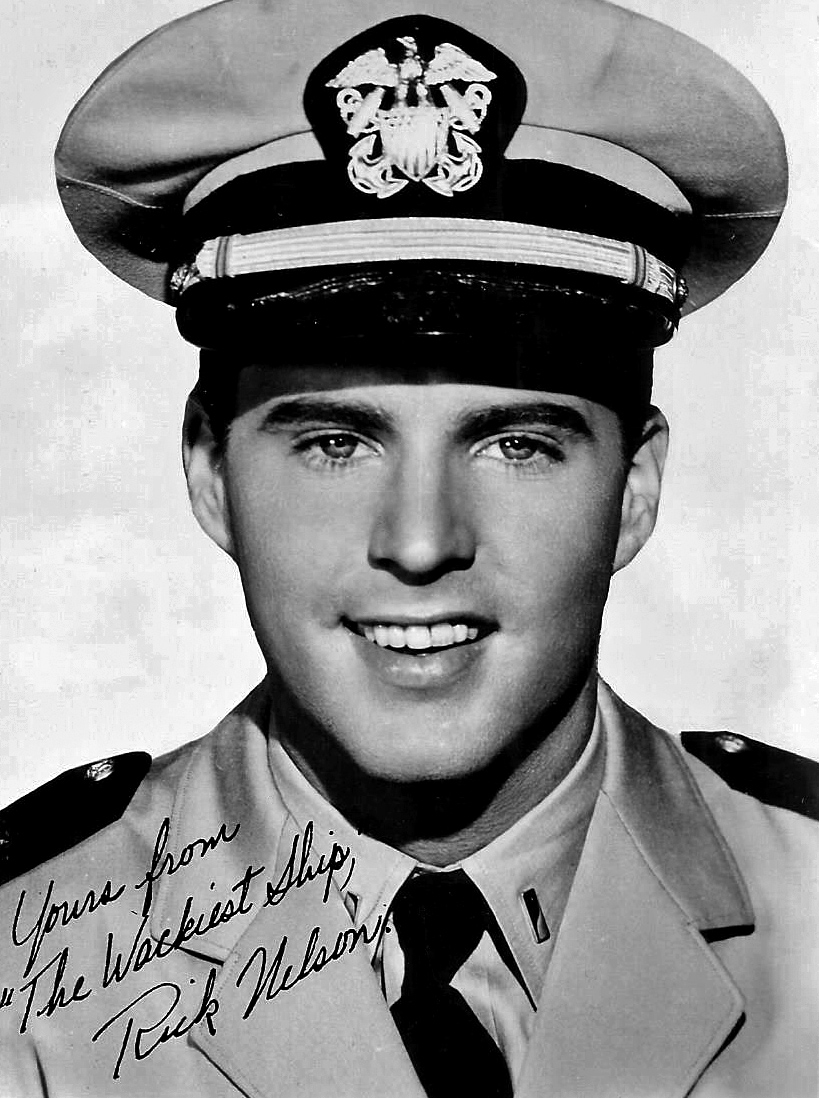
Nelson publicity photo, 1960

During 1958 and 1959, Nelson had twelve hits in the charts in comparison with Elvis Presley's eleven. During these two years, Presley had recorded music only for the movie King Creole, in January and February 1958, before Elvis' induction into the U.S. Army and a brief recording session (consisting of five songs) while on military leave four months later.

In the summer of 1958, Nelson conducted his first full-scale tour, averaging $5,000 nightly. By 1960, the Ricky Nelson International Fan Club had 9,000 chapters around the world.

Perhaps the most embarrassing moment in my career was when six girls tried to fling themselves under my car, and shouted to me to run over them. That sort of thing can be very frightening! – NME – May 1960

Nelson was the first teen idol to use television to promote hit records. Ozzie Nelson even had the idea to edit footage together to create some of the first music videos. This creative editing can be seen in videos Ozzie produced for "Travelin' Man". Nelson appeared on The Ed Sullivan Show in 1967, but his career by that time was in limbo. He also appeared on other television shows (usually in acting roles). In 1973, he had an acting role in an episode of The Streets of San Francisco. He starred in the episode "A Hand For Sonny Blue" from the 1977 series Quinn Martin's Tales of the Unexpected (known in the United Kingdom as Twist in the Tale). In 1979, he guest-hosted on Saturday Night Live, spoofing his television sitcom image by appearing in a Twilight Zone sendup in which, always trying to go "home," he finds himself among the characters from other 1950s/early 1960s-era sitcoms, Leave It to Beaver, Father Knows Best, Make Room for Daddy, and I Love Lucy.

Nelson knew and loved music and was a skilled performer even before he became a teen idol, largely because of his parents' musical background. Nelson worked with many musicians of repute, including James Burton, Joe Osborn, and Allen "Puddler" Harris, all natives of Louisiana, and Joe Maphis, The Jordanaires, Scotty Moore, and Johnny and Dorsey Burnette.

Nelson's music is considered to be recorded with a clear, punchy sound—thanks in part to engineer Bunny Robyn and producer Jimmy Haskell.

From 1957 to 1962, Nelson had 30 Top-40 hits, more than any other artist except Presley (who had 53) and Pat Boone (38). Many of Nelson's early records were double hits with both the A and B sides hitting the Billboard charts.

While Nelson preferred rockabilly and uptempo rock songs like "Believe What You Say" (Hot 100 No. 4), "I Got a Feeling" (No. 10), "My Bucket's Got a Hole in It" (No. 12), "Hello Mary Lou" (No. 9), "It's Late" (No. 9), "Stood Up" (No. 2), "Waitin' in School" (No. 18), "Be-Bop Baby" (No. 3), and "Just a Little Too Much" (No. 9), his smooth, calm voice made him a natural to sing ballads. He had major success with "Travelin' Man" (No. 1), "A Teenager's Romance" (No. 2), "Poor Little Fool" (No. 1), "Young World" (No. 5), "Lonesome Town" (No. 7), "Never Be Anyone Else But You" (No. 6), "Sweeter Than You" (No. 9), "It's Up to You" (No. 6), and "Teen Age Idol" (No. 5).

== Film and television actor ==
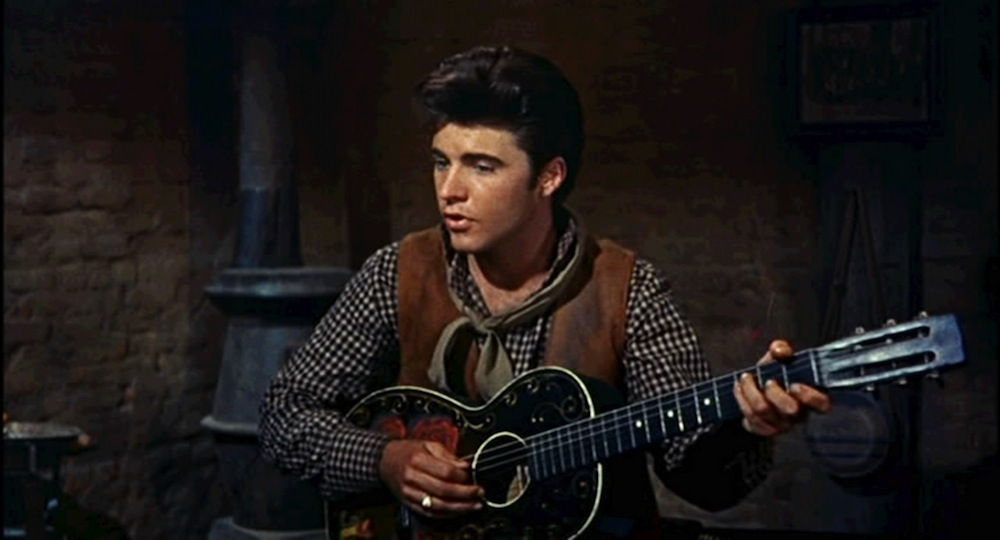
Nelson in Rio Bravo, 1959

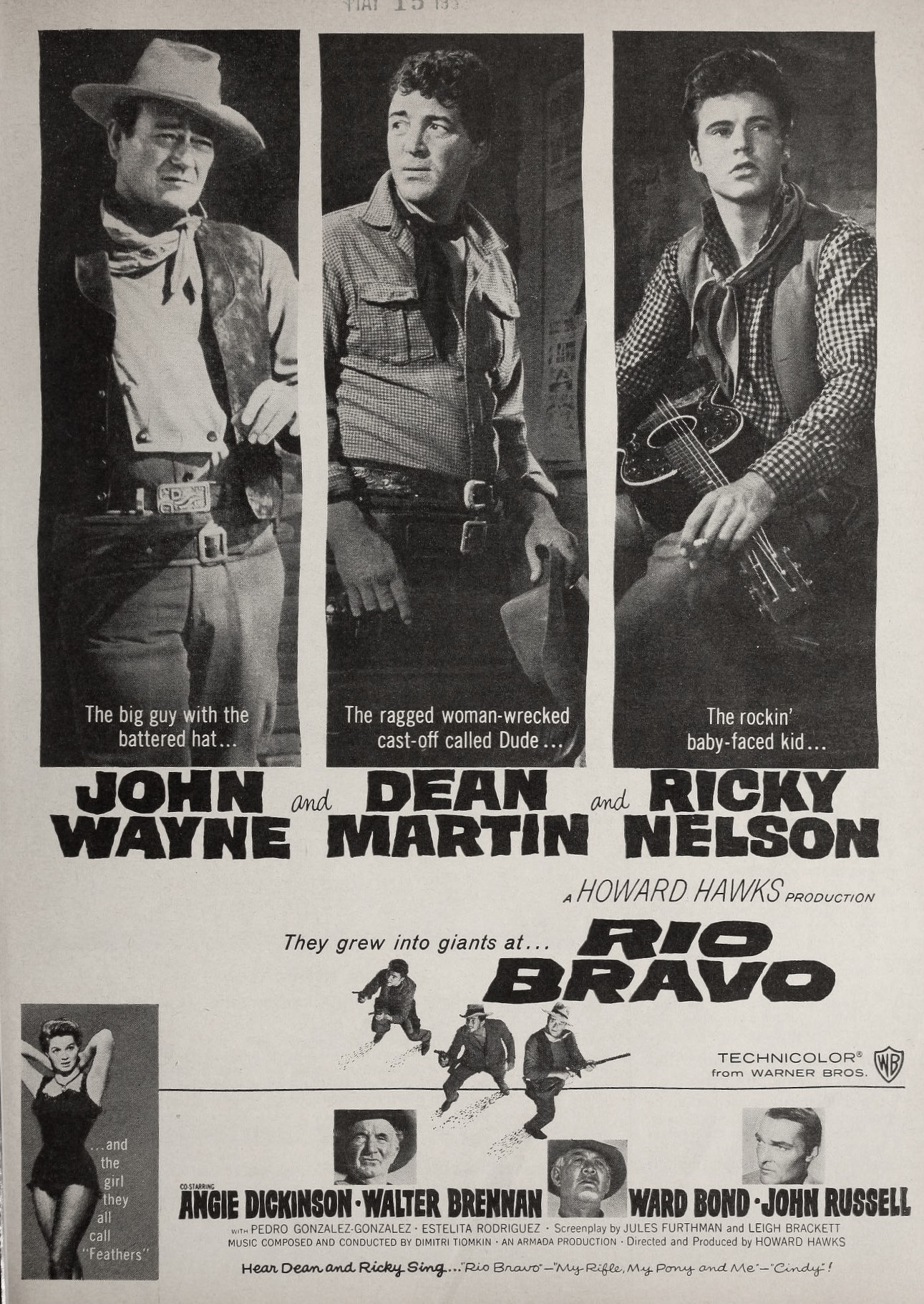

In addition to his recording career, Nelson appeared in movies. He made his film debut in Here Come the Nelsons (1952) and had a small role in The Story of Three Loves (1953) at MGM directed by Vincente Minnelli playing Farley Granger as a boy.

Following his success on TV and with singing, Howard Hawks cast him as a gunslinger in Rio Bravo (1959) with John Wayne and Dean Martin; Hawks attributed much of the film's box office success to Nelson.

Nelson co-starred with Jack Lemmon in The Wackiest Ship in the Army (1960), which was popular enough to give rise to a TV series (in which Nelson did not appear). He guest starred on General Electric Theatre ("The Wish Book") and starred in a romantic comedy feature written and directed by his father, Love and Kisses (1965) with Jack Kelly.

Nelson guest starred on Hondo (playing Jesse James), and had a support role in The Over-the-Hill Gang (1969) with Walter Brennan and Pat O'Brien.

Nelson was in Fol-de-Rol (1972), guest starred on McCloud, The Streets of San Francisco, Owen Marshall, Counselor at Law, Petrocelli, A Twist in the Tale, The Hardy Boys/Nancy Drew Mysteries, and The Love Boat. On The Hardy Boys/Nancy Drew Mysteries he played the part of "Tony Eagle" and performed various well-known Nelson songs throughout the episode.

He had supporting actor roles in the TV films Three on a Date and High School USA (1983).

== Name change and 1960s career ==
On May 8, 1961 (his 21st birthday), he officially modified his recording name from "Ricky Nelson" to "Rick Nelson". His childhood nickname proved hard to shake, especially among the generation who watched him grow up on Ozzie and Harriet. Even in the 1980s, when Nelson realized his dream of meeting Carl Perkins, Perkins noted that he and "Ricky" were the last of the "rockabilly breed".

In 1963, Nelson signed a 20-year contract with Decca Records. After some early successes, most notably 1964's "For You" (No. 6), Nelson's chart career came to a dramatic halt in the wake of Beatlemania, The British Invasion, and later the Counterculture era. However, Decca kept him on board.

In the mid-1960s, Nelson began to move toward country music, becoming a pioneer in the country-rock genre. He was one of the early influences of the so-called "California Sound" (which would include singers like Jackson Browne and Linda Ronstadt and bands such as Eagles). Yet Nelson himself did not reach the Top 40 again until 1970, when he recorded Bob Dylan's "She Belongs to Me" with the Stone Canyon Band, featuring Randy Meisner, who in 1971 became a founding member of the Eagles, and former Buckaroo steel guitarist Tom Brumley.

== "Garden Party" and comeback ==
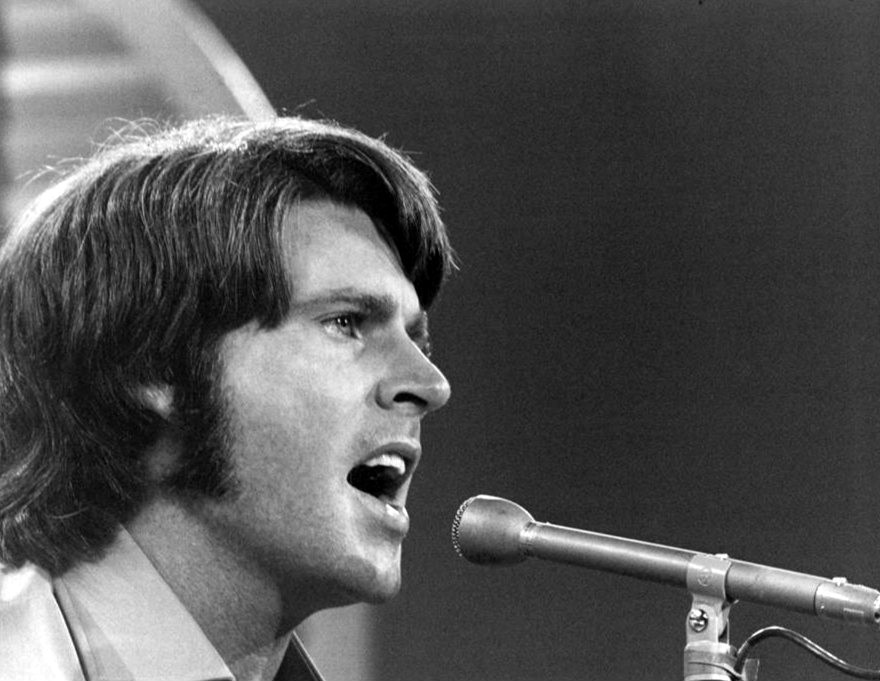
Nelson performing on The Jim Nabors Show in 1970

In 1972, Nelson reached the Top 40 one last time with "Garden Party," a song he wrote in disgust after a 1971 Richard Nader Oldies Concert at Madison Square Garden where the audience booed. Nelson thought it was directed at him — either because he sported long hair and wore "mod" clothing, or perhaps because he chose to play a song that was not one of his earlier hits.

When Nelson sang The Rolling Stones' "Country Honk" (a country version of "Honky Tonk Women"), there was booing from the crowd. Though some reports say the booing was directed at security breaking up a fight in the back of the audience, Nelson interpreted it as disapproval of his new look and sound. Upset, he went backstage and watched the rest of the show on a TV monitor until Richard Nader convinced him to return to the stage and play his "oldies." He did so, and the audience responded with applause, according to Deborah Nader, President of Richard Nader Entertainment. However, Nelson then left the building and did not appear onstage for the finale.

He wanted to record an album featuring original material, but Garden Party was released as a single before the album was completed. "Garden Party" reached No. 6 on the Billboard Hot 100 and no. 1 on the Billboard Adult Contemporary chart and was certified as a gold single. The second single released from the album was "Palace Guard", which peaked at No. 65.

In 1973, MCA Records, whose parent company MCA Inc. had owned American Decca since 1962, ceased the label's operations and transferred Nelson (and many other Decca artists) to its roster. His comeback was short-lived, and Nelson's band soon resigned. MCA wanted Nelson to have a producer on his next album. A new band was formed by Lindy Goetz, then a promoter for MCA Records. The band moved to Aspen and changed their name to "Canyon." Nelson and the new Stone Canyon Band began to tour for the Garden Party album. Nelson still played nightclubs and bars, but soon advanced to higher-paying venues because of the single's success.

In 1974, MCA was unsure about what to do with the former teen idol. Albums such as Windfall failed to have an impact. Nelson became an attraction at theme parks like Knott's Berry Farm and Disneyland, and also started appearing in minor TV roles. He tried to score another hit, but had no luck with songs such as "Rock and Roll Lady." With seven years to go on Nelson's contract, MCA dropped him.

== Personal life ==
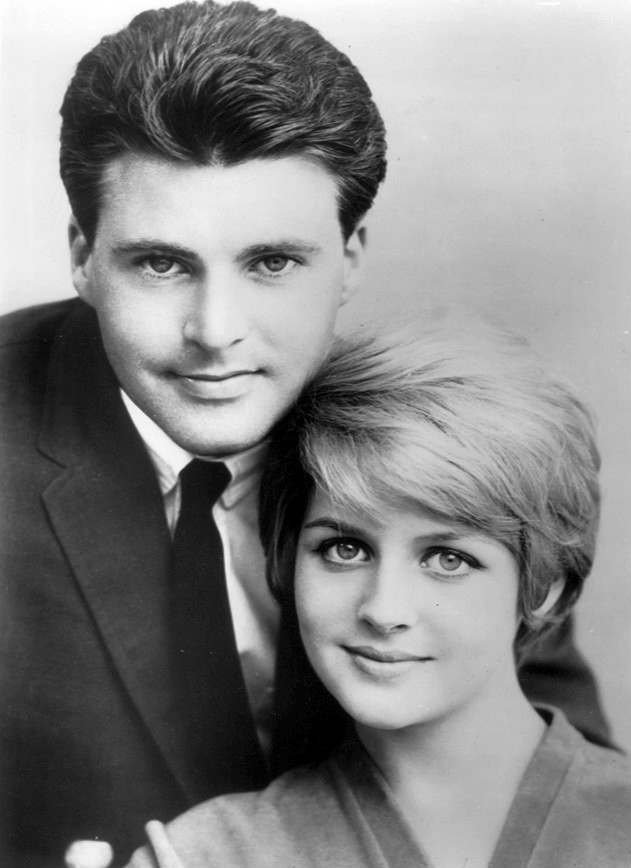
Ricky and Kristin Nelson in 1964

In 1957, when Nelson was 17, he met and fell in love with Marianne Gaba, who played the role of Ricky's girlfriend in three episodes of Ozzie and Harriet. Nelson and Gaba were too young to enter a serious relationship, although according to Gaba "we used to neck for hours."

The next year, Nelson fell in love with 15-year-old Lorrie Collins, a country singer appearing on a weekly telecast called Town Hall Party. The two wrote Nelson's first composition, the song "My Gal", and she introduced him to Johnny Cash and Tex Ritter. Collins appeared in an Ozzie and Harriet episode as Ricky's girlfriend and sang "Just Because" with him in the musical finale. They went steady and discussed marriage, but their parents discouraged the idea.

=== Kris Harmon ===
In 1961, Nelson began dating Kristin Harmon (June 25, 1945 – April 26, 2018), the daughter of football player Tom Harmon and actress Elyse Knox (née Elsie Kornbrath) and the older sister of Kelly and Mark Harmon. The Nelsons and the Harmons had long been friends, and a union between their children held great appeal. Rick and Kris had much in common: quiet dispositions, Hollywood upbringings, and high-powered, domineering fathers.

They married on April 20, 1963. Kris was pregnant, and Rick later described the union as a "shotgun wedding". Nelson, a nonpracticing Protestant, received instruction in Catholicism at the insistence of the bride's parents and signed a pledge to have any children of the union raised in the Catholic faith. Kris Nelson joined the television show as a regular cast member in 1963. They had four children: actress Tracy Kristine Nelson, twin sons Gunnar Eric Nelson and Matthew Gray Nelson who formed the band Nelson, and Sam Hilliard Nelson.

By 1975, following the birth of their last child, the marriage had deteriorated and a very public, controversial divorce involving both families was covered in the press for several years. In October 1977, Kris filed for divorce and asked for alimony, custody of their four children, and a portion of community property. The couple temporarily resolved their differences, but Kris retained her attorney to pursue a permanent break. Kris wanted Rick to give up music, spend more time at home, and focus on acting, but the family enjoyed a recklessly expensive lifestyle, and Kris's extravagant spending left Rick with no choice but to tour relentlessly. The impasse over Rick's career created unpleasantness at home. Kris became an alcoholic and left the children in the care of household help. After years of legal proceedings, they were divorced in December 1982. The divorce was financially devastating for Nelson, with attorneys and accountants taking over $1 million. Years of legal wrangling followed.

=== Helen Blair ===
In 1980, Nelson met Helen Blair, a part-time model and exotic animal trainer, in Las Vegas. Within months of their meeting, she became his road companion, and in 1982 she began living with him. She was the only woman he dated after his divorce.

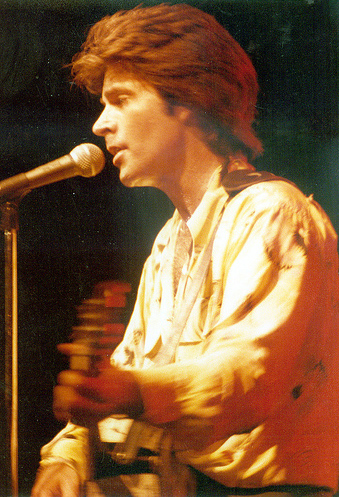
Nelson plays at a concert in Lawton, Oklahoma.

Blair acted as personal assistant to Nelson, organizing his day and acting as a liaison for his fan club, but Nelson's mother, brother, business manager, and manager disapproved of her presence in his life. He contemplated marrying her but eventually declined. Blair died with Nelson in the airplane fire. Her name was never mentioned at Nelson's funeral. Blair's parents wanted their daughter buried next to Nelson at Forest Lawn Cemetery, but Harriet dismissed the idea. The Blairs refused to bury Helen's remains and filed a $2 million wrongful death suit against Nelson's estate. They received a small settlement.

== Death ==
On December 31, 1985, Nelson died when the Douglas DC-3, on which he was a passenger, was stricken with a cabin fire and forced to make a crash landing in a field. The aircraft had been traveling between Guntersville, Alabama, and Dallas, Texas, where Nelson was to perform a New Year's Eve concert. The aircraft, which Nelson owned, had suffered mechanical failures on previous flights. The fire was determined to have been caused by a defective heater in the tail of the plane. Both pilots survived by escaping through the cockpit windows before the plane was consumed by flames, but all seven passengers died because they were unable to escape the smoke-filled passenger cabin.

== Legacy ==
- Nelson appears in Stephen King's 1992 short story "You Know They Got a Hell of a Band" as a resident of Rock and Roll Heaven, Oregon, along with several other deceased rock musicians.
- In 1994, a Golden Palm Star on the Palm Springs, California, Walk of Stars was dedicated to him.
- In 2004, Rolling Stone ranked Nelson number 91 on their list of the 100 Greatest Artists of All Time.
- In 2005, at the 20th anniversary of Nelson's death, PBS televised Ricky Nelson Sings, a documentary featuring interviews with his children as well as James Burton and Kris Kristofferson.
- Nelson dies in 1996 in Paul Levinson's 2024 novel It's Real Life: An Alternate History of The Beatles, chapter 8.
- Hall of Fame baseball player Rickey Henderson was named Rickey Nelson Henley Henderson after Ricky Nelson.

== Discography ==
Studio albums

- Ricky (1957)
- Ricky Nelson (1958)
- Ricky Sings Again (1959)
- Songs by Ricky (1959)
- More Songs by Ricky (1960)
- Rick Is 21 (1961)
- Album Seven by Rick (1962)
- For Your Sweet Love (1963)
- Rick Nelson Sings "For You" (1963)
- The Very Thought of You (1964)
- Spotlight on Rick (1964)
- Best Always (1965)
- Love and Kisses (1965)
- Bright Lights and Country Music (1966)
- Country Fever (1967)
- Another Side of Rick (1967)
- Perspective (1969)
- Rick Sings Nelson (1970)
- Rudy the Fifth (1971)
- Garden Party (1972)
- Windfall (1974)
- Intakes (1977)
- Playing to Win (1981)
- All My Best (1985)
- The Memphis Sessions (1986)

== Filmography ==
Year	Title	Role	Notes
1952	Here Come the Nelsons	Himself	
1952–66	The Adventures of Ozzie and Harriet	Himself	series regular (433 episodes) credited in later seasons as Rick Nelson
1953	The Story of Three Loves	Tommy (age 11)	segment "Mademoiselle"
1959	Rio Bravo	Colorado Ryan	
1960	The Wackiest Ship in the Army	Ensign Tommy J. Hanson	
1961	General Electric Theater	Lonnie Follett	— "The Wish Book"
1965	The Ed Sullivan Show	Himself	— "18.19" credited as Rick Nelson
1965	Love and Kisses	Buzzy	
1966	The Ed Sullivan Show	Himself	— Musical guest "Ricky Nelson, / Duke Ellington, Maria Cole, Eydie Gorme, Jo Anne Worley, George Kirby, Robert Bob King" credited as Rick Nelson
1966	ABC Stage 67	Carlos O'Connor	— On the Flip Side, a television musical with music by Burt Bacharach and lyrics by Hal David
1967	Hondo	Jesse James	— "Hondo and the Judas" credited as Rick Nelson
1967	Malibu U.	Himself (Host)	recurring role (6 episodes)
1969	The Over-the-Hill Gang	Jeff Rose	TV movie
1969	The Glen Campbell Goodtime Hour	Himself	— Musical guest "Michele Lee, George Lindsey, Rick Nelson"
1970	The Resurrection of Broncho Billy	voice role	Short Film
1970	Swing Out, Sweet Land	Confederate Soldier	TV special about U.S. history
1970	The Johnny Cash Show	Himself	— Musical guest "1.30"
1970	The Everly Brothers Show	Himself	— "1.9"
1970	The Merv Griffin Show	Himself	— Musical guest "Pat Pausen, Rick Nelson, Alex Dreier, Charo, Sidney Sheldon"
1972	Fol-de-Rol	The Minstrel	TV movie credited as Rick Nelson
1972	McCloud	Jimmy Roy Taylor	— "The New Mexican Connection" credited as Rick Nelson
1972, 1974	Owen Marshall, Counselor at Law	Vic / Gar Kellerman	2 episodes — "Victim in the Shadow" (1972) — "A Foreigner Among Us" (1974) credited as Rick Nelson
1973	The Streets of San Francisco	William T. "Billy" Jeffers	— "Harem" credited as Rick Nelson
1973	Easy to Be Free	Himself	
1974	Petrocelli	Country Boy White	— "Music to Die By" credited as Rick Nelson
1974	Sonic Boom	Jess of the Van	Short Film credited as Rick Nelson
1977	Tales of the Unexpected	Sonny Blue	— "A Hand for Sonny Blue"
1977	The Hardy Boys/Nancy Drew Mysteries	Tony Eagle	— "The Flickering Torch Mystery" credited as Rick Nelson
1978	The Love Boat	Ted Wilcox / Alex Fowler	— "Memories of You / Computerman / Parlez Vous?" credited as Rick Nelson
1978	Three on a Date	Bob Oakes	TV movie
1979	Saturday Night Live	Himself (Host / Musical Guest)	— "Ricky Nelson / Judy Collins" credited as Rick Nelson
1981	CBS Library	Skeeter	— "A Tale of Four Wishes"
1984	High School U.S.A.	Principal Pete Kinney	TV movie credited as Rick Nelson
