= Garden party (disambiguation) =

A garden party is a gathering of people at an outdoor venue, particularly of social elites.

Garden Party may also refer to:

== Film and television ==
- The Garden Party, a 1973 short film by Jack Sholder
- Garden Party (2008 film), a film starring Vinessa Shaw and Willa Holland
- Garden Party (2017 film), a CG animated short film
- "Garden Party" (The Office), an episode of The Office
- "The Garden Party" (Surgical Spirit), a 1990 television episode
- "The Garden Party", an episode from season 1 of the animated television series The Boondocks

== Music ==
- Garden Party (album), a 1972 album by Rick Nelson
  - "Garden Party" (Rick Nelson song), a song from the album
- "Garden Party" (Marillion song), released by Marillion in 1983
- "Garden Party", a song by Mezzoforte, from the 1982 album Surprise Surprise
- Garden Party (festival), an Irish music festival

== Other uses ==
- The Garden Party (play), a 1963 play by Václav Havel
- The Garden Party (short story collection), a 1922 collection of short stories by Katherine Mansfield
  - "The Garden Party" (short story), a story from the collection
- Rosa 'Garden Party', a hybrid tea rose cultivar
- An alternative name for the 1633 Rubens painting The Garden of Love
- Garden Party (Germany), a political party in Germany
