= Mezzo forte =

Mezzo forte may refer to:

- Mezzo forte (musical notation), a dynamic level in musical notation
- Mezzo Forte, an anime series
- Mezzoforte (band), an Icelandic instrumental jazz-funk fusion group
  - Mezzoforte (album), their 1979 debut album

== See also ==
- Requiem – Mezzo Forte, an album by Virgin Black
