= Gunnar Þórðarson =

Icelandic musician (1945–2026)

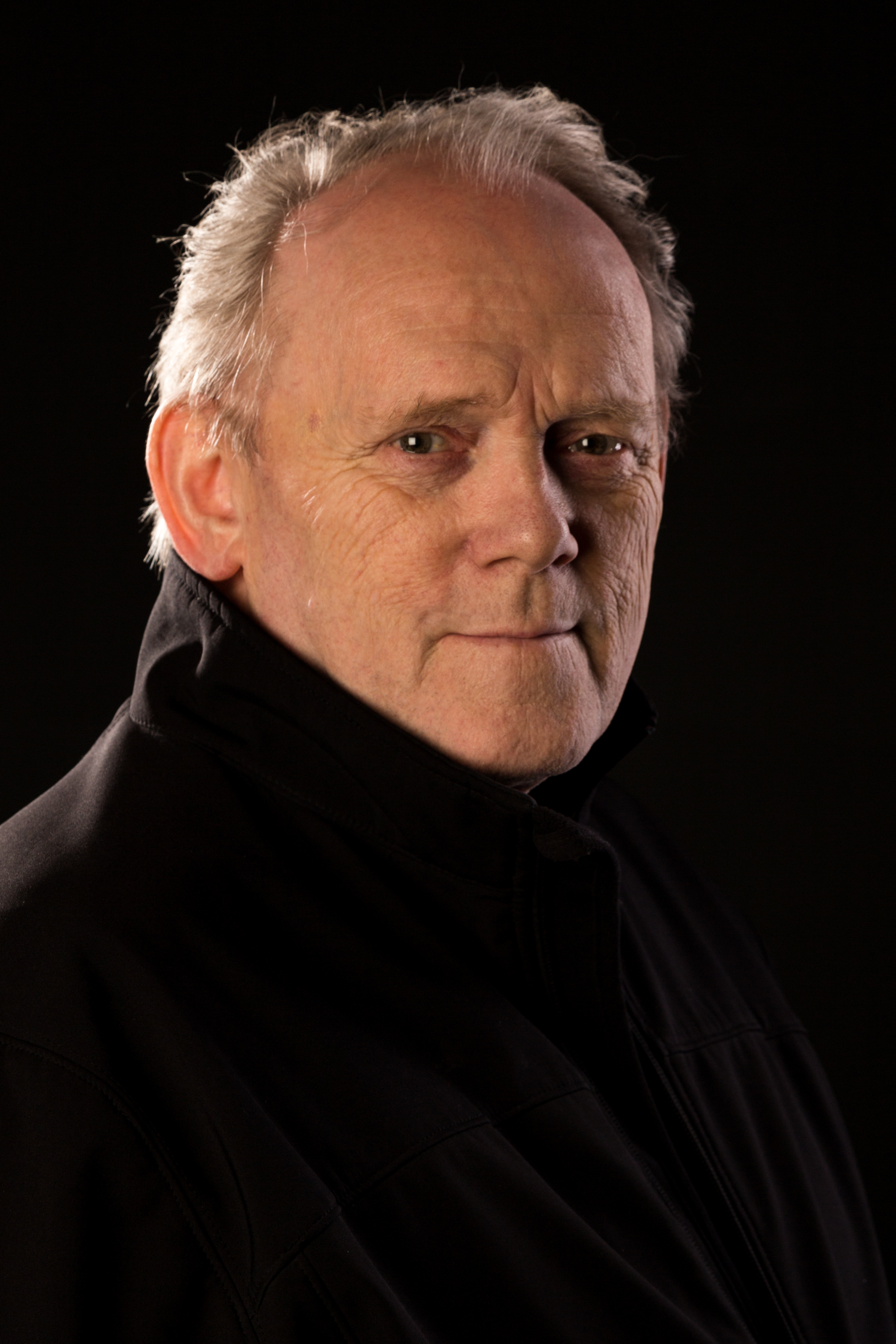
- Born: 4 January 1945; Hólmavík, Iceland
- Died: 29 July 2026 (aged 81); Reykjavík, Iceland
- Occupation: Musician
- Spouse: Toby Sigrún Herman

Gunnar Þórðarson (THOR-thar-son; Icelandic pronunciation: [θorːðar.sɔn]) (4 January 1945 – 29 July 2026) was an Icelandic songwriter, guitarist, producer, and composer. He is considered one of Iceland's greatest songwriters of the second half of the 20th century, and made significant contributions in a wide variety of genres, including pop, rock, disco, folk, and classical.

== Life and career ==
Gunnar Þórðarson was born in Hólmavík, but moved with his family to Keflavík at age eight. His father worked for the U.S. army at the local NATO base, and the U.S. Army radio station became an early musical influence, as it played music that was not commonly heard on Icelandic National Radio. He played drums and guitar as a boy and at age eighteen joined his first band. In 1963, he and Rúnar Júlíusson started the band Hljómar, which soon became Iceland's most popular "Beatles"-band. He began writing his own songs in 1964, later naming Burt Bacharach, the Beatles, Stevie Wonder, and Brian Wilson among his most significant influences.

Hljómar's first 45-rpm record was released in 1965 and was an immediate hit, containing the up-tempo "Fyrsti kossinn" (The First Kiss) and the ballad "Bláu augun þín" (Your Blue Eyes). In 1969, Hljómar joined another band, Flowers, to create the "super-group" Trúbrot, which was active until 1973 and released three LP-records. Gunnar was also an active member of Ríó Tríó, a popular folk band.

In the 1970s and 1980s, Gunnar was active as a songwriter, performer, and producer, with a string of successful records with groups including Ðe Lónlí Blú Bojs, Þú og ég, and Lummurnar, as well as highly popular albums of Christmas music and children's songs. In 1999, he was a founding member of the guitar trio Guitar Islancio, which released several albums, largely consisting of arrangements of Icelandic folk songs.

Gunnar was largely self-taught as a musician. His love for classical music led him to study classical harmony and instrumentation, and he wrote three large-scale classical works. Heilög messa (Holy Mass) for soloists, choir, and orchestra was premiered in 2000, followed by Brynjólfsmessa (Mass of Brynjólfur) in 2006. In 2013 he premiered his only large-scale classical work, the opera Ragnheiður to a libretto by Friðrik Erlingsson, based on the story of Ragnheiður Brynjólfsdóttir, the daughter of the Bishop of Skálholt (1641–1663). The opera was highly popular and received outstanding reviews; it was released both on CD and DVD.

He was among Iceland's most awarded musicians. He received the Order of the Falcon in 2002, and the Lifetime Achievement Award at the Icelandic Music Awards in 1996. In 2014 he was the Honorary Artist of the City of Reykjavík. His biography, Gunnar Þórðarsson: Lífssaga, was published in 2021.

Gunnar died on 29 July 2026, at the age of 81.

== Discography (selected) ==
- Þuríður & Pálmi syngja lög eftir Gunnar Þórðarson (1972)
- Gunnar Þórðarson (1975)
- Einu sinni var – Vísur úr Vísnabókinni (1976)
- Jólastjörnur (1976)
- Gamlar góðar lummur (with Lummurnar, 1977)
- Út um græna grundu (1977)
- Lummur um land allt (1978)
- Í hátíðarskapi (1980)
- Himinn og jörð (1981)
- Borgarbragur Gunnars Þórðarsonar (1985)
- Reykjavíkurflugur (1986)
- Heilög messa (2000)
- Brynjólfsmessa (2006)
- Ragnheiður, opera (2014)
