= Steinar (disambiguation) =

Steinar (born 1994) is an Icelandic singer.

Steinar may also refer to:

- Steinar (name), a given name (and list of people with the name)
- Thor Steinar, a German clothing brand by Thor Steinar Mediatex GmbH
- Steinar, Icelandic record label now part of Sena
