= Bubbi Morthens =

Icelandic musician (born 1956)

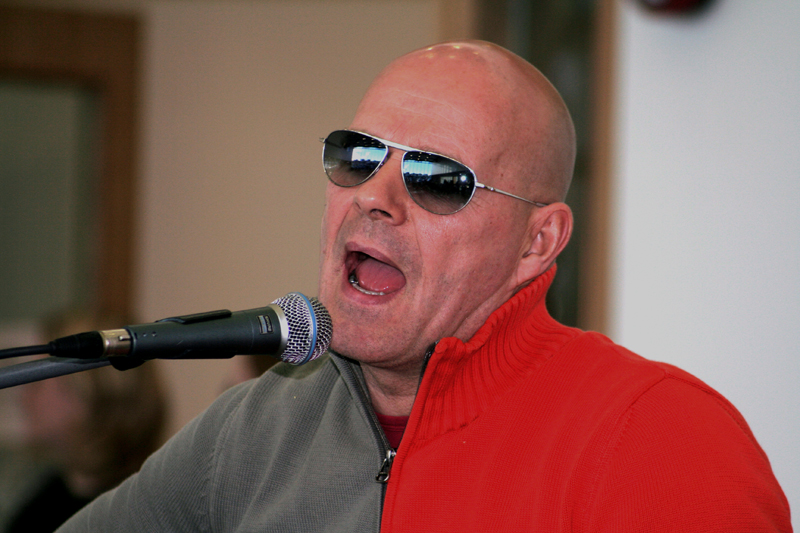
- Bubbi Morthens in 2006

Background information
- Born: Ásbjörn Kristinsson Morthens; 6 June 1956 (age 70)
- Origin: Reykjavík, Iceland
- Genres: Rock; blues; reggae
- Occupations: Musician; songwriter
- Instruments: Vocals; guitar; harmonica
- Years active: 1979–present
- Labels: Iðunnn; Steinar; Safarí; Gramm; Mistlur; Geisli; Skífan; Mál Og Menning; Sena; Blindsker
- Website: bubbi.is

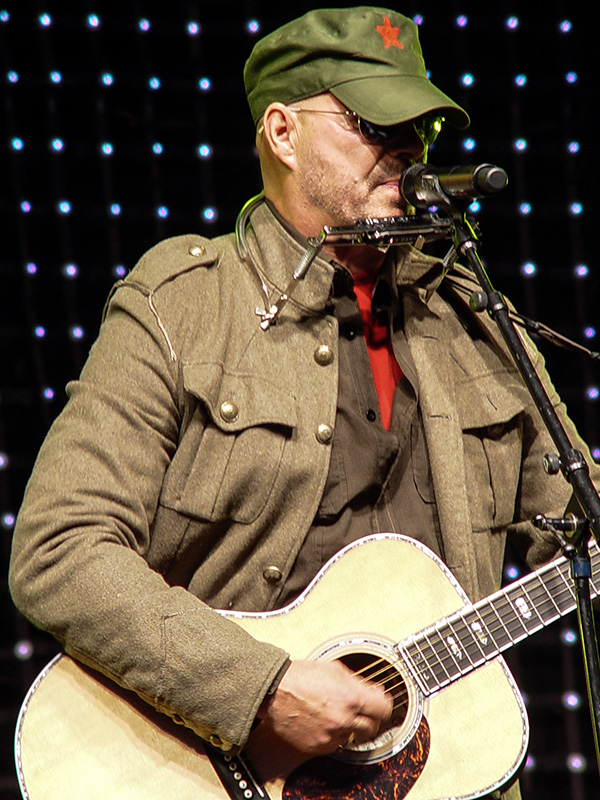
Bubbi Morthens, Laugardalsvöllur, Iceland (2007)

Bubbi Morthens (full name Ásbjörn Kristinsson Morthens; born 6 June 1956) is an Icelandic singer and songwriter. Aside from a lengthy solo career, he has been a member of such Icelandic bands as Utangarðsmenn and Egó.

== Personal life ==
Bubbi was born in Reykjavík to a Danish mother and a half-Norwegian, half-Icelandic father. Bubbi is a common nickname for Ásbjörn.

He developed a strong addiction to cocaine and alcohol in his youth, and later in life he became an advocate for sobriety and addiction prevention. In 2018, he published the poetry book Rof about the sexual abuse he was a victim of as a child.

In 1973 (at the age of 17), Bubbi became a migrant worker.

In 2004, the documentary Blindsker about the life of Bubbi was released.

In 2020, a musical based on the life of Bubbi, named Níu líf ("Nine Lives") was shown in Reykjavík City Theatre.

== Discography ==
=== With Utangarðsmenn, (1980–1981) ===
==== EPs ====
- 1980 – Ha ha ha (Rækjureggae) (Steinar)
- 1981 – 45 RPM (Steinar)

==== Albums ====
- 1980 – Geislavirkir (Steinar)
- 1981 – Í upphafi skyldi endinn skoða (Steinar), compilation release
- 1994 – Utangarðsmenn (Japís), Live
- 2000 – Fuglinn er floginn (Skífan), compilation release

==== Collaborations ====
- 1981 – Flugur (Steinar) Icelandic compilation
- 1981 – Gæðapopp (Steinar), Icelandic compilation
- 1981 – Northern Lights Playhouse (Fálkinn), Icelandic compilation
- 1982 – Næst á dagskrá (Steinar), Icelandic compilation
- 1985 – Með lögum skal land byggja (Steinar), Icelandic compilation
- 1998 – Nælur (Spor) compilation

=== Discography of Egó ===
Discography of Egó (1982–1984, 2001, 2009–present):

==== Albums ====
- 1982 – Breyttir tímar (Steinar)
- 1982 – Í mynd (Steinar)
- 1984 – Egó (Steinar)
- 2001 – Frá upphafi til enda (Skífan), compilation release
- 2009 – 6. október (Sena)

==== Singles ====
- 2009 – "Kannski Varð Bylting Vorið 2009" (Sena); only released on the internet
- 2009 – "Í Hjarta Mér" (Sena); only released on the internet
- 2009 – "Fallegi Lúserinn minn" (Sena); only released on the internet
- 2009 – "Ástin ert þú á litinn" (Sena); only released on the internet
- 2009 – "Engill ræður för" (Sena); only released on the internet
- 2014 – "Ég fyrirgef þér allt"

==== Featuring on film ====
- 1982 – Rokk í Reykjavík (Íslenska kvikmyndasamsteypan), documentary directed by Friðrik Þór Friðriksson
- 2004 – Blindsker

=== Discography of Das Kapital ===
==== Album ====
- 1984 – Lili Marlene (Gramm)

==== Featuring ====
- 1987 – Geyser – Anthology of the Icelandic Independent Music Scene of the Eighties (Enigma Records), Icelandic compilation

=== Discography of MX-21 ===
==== Singles ====
- 1987 – Skapar fegurðin hamingju? (Gramm)
- 2023 - Kennarasleikja (Gramm)

=== Discography of Bubbi and Megas ===
==== Album ====
- 1988 – Bláir draumar (Gramm)

=== Discography of G.C.D. ===
==== Albums ====
- 1991 – G.C.D. (Steinar)
- 1993 – Svefnvana (Skífan)
- 1995 – Teika (Skífan)
- 2002 – Mýrdalssandur (Skífan), compilation release

=== Discography of Bubbi Morthens and Björn Jr. Friðbjörnsson ===
==== Singles ====
- 2008 – "Ég er kominn heim" (Sena), Only released on the internet

==== Featuring ====
- 2008 – Pottþétt 46 (Sena)

=== Discography of Bubbi Morthens and Björgvin Halldórsson ===
==== Singles ====
- 2013 – "Það er gott að elska" (from the Duet 3 album)

Discography of Bubbi Morthens and Dimma

• 2015 - Bubbi & Dimma

• 2016 - Minnismerki

Discography of Bubbi Morthens and Spaðadrottningarnar

• 2015 - 18 konur

== Bubbi Morthens solo discography ==
=== Solo albums ===
- 1980 – Ísbjarnarblús (Bubbi/Iðunn)
- 1981 – Plágan (Steinar)
- 1983 – Fingraför (Steinar)
- 1983 – Línudans (Steinar), compilation release
- 1984 – Ný spor (Safarí)
- 1985 – Kona (Gramm)
- 1986 – Blús fyrir Rikka (Gramm)
- 1987 – Frelsi til sölu (Gramm)
- 1987 – Dögun (Gramm)
- 1988 – Serbian Flower (Mistlur)
- 1989 – Nóttin Langa (Geisli)
- 1990 – Fingraför (Steinar)
- 1990 – Sögur af landi (Steinar)
- 1991 – Ég er (Steinar)
- 1992 – Von (Steinar)
- 1993 – Lífið er ljúft (Skífan)
- 1994 – 3 Heimar (Skífan)
- 1995 – Í Skugga Morthens (Skífan)
- 1996 – Allar áttir (Skífan)
- 1996 – Hvíta hliðin á svörtu (Mál & Menning)
- 1997 – Trúir þú á engla (Skífan)
- 1998 – Arfur (Skífan)
- 1999 – Sögur 1980–1990 (Íslenskir Tónar), compilation release
- 2000 – Bellman (Skífan)
- 2000 – Sögur 1990–2000 (Íslenskir Tónar), compilation release
- 2001 – Nýbúinn (Skífan)
- 2002 – Sól að morgni (Skífan)
- 2003 – 1000 kossa nótt (Skífan)
- 2004 – Blindsker (Skífan), Soundtrack
- 2004 – Tvíburinn (Skífan)
- 2005 – Ást (Skífan)
- 2005 – Í 6 skrefa fjarlægð frá Paradís (Skífan)
- 2005 – Gleðileg jól (Tolli/Bónus)
- 2006 – Bláir (Íslenskir Tónar)
- 2006 – Lögin Mín (Sena)
- 2006 – 06.06.06 (Sena)
- 2007 – Góð Verk 07 (Stafræn útgáfa fyrir iPod) (Sena/Apple), compilation release
- 2008 – Fjórir Naglar (Sena/Blindsker)
- 2008 – Bubbi og Stórsveit Reykjavíkur (Sena/Blindsker)
- 2010 – Sögur af ást, landi og þjóð 1980–2010 (Sena), compilation release, 3XCD+DVD
- 2011 – Ég Trúi Á Þig (Sena)
- 2012 – Þorpið (Sena)
- 2013 – Stormurinn (Sena)
- 2013 – Æsku minnar jól (Sena)
- 2015 – 18 konur (Tónlist.is) with Spaðadrottningarnar
- 2015 – Bubbi & Dimma (Prime Umboðsskrifstofa) with Dimma, live album
- 2016 – Minnismerki (Prime Umboðsskrifstofa) with Dimma, live album
- 2017 – Tungumál (Prime Umboðsskrifstofa)
- 2019 – Regnbogans stræti
- 2021 – Sjálfsmynd
- 2023 – Ljós og skuggar
- 2024 – Dansaðu

=== Solo EPs ===
- 1988 – 56 (Gramm)
- 1989 – Hver er næstur? (Geisli)
- 1999 – Mér líkar það (Íslenskir Tónar)

=== Solo singles ===
- 1988 – "Moon in the Gutter" (Mistlur); taken from the Mistlur LP Serbian Flower
- 2004 – "Nei Nei Nei – Tjáningarfrelsi" (Skífan)
- 2005 – "Þú" (Skífan); taken from Ást; only released on the internet
- 2005 – "Ástin getur aldrei orðið gömul frétt", Taken from Í 6 Skrefa Fjarlægð Frá Paradís (Skífan); only released on the internet
- 2006 – "Grafir og bein" (Sena), Taken from Lögin Mín; only released on the internet
- 2007 – "Ísbjarnarblús" (Sena); only released on the internet
- 2008 – "Ég Er Kominn Heim" with Björn Jr. Friðbjörnsson, (Sena); only released on the internet
- 2010 – "Sól" (Sena); only released on the internet
- 2011 – "Ísabella" (Sena); only released on the internet
- 2011 – "Blik þinna augna" (Sena); only released on the internet
- 2011 – "Háskaleikur" (Sena); only released on the internet
- 2012 – "Þorpið" with Mugison (Sena); only released on the internet
- 2013 – "Brosandi börn"
- 2013 – "Allt var það krónunni að kenna"
- 2013 – "Trúðu á ljósið"
- 2013 – "Hátíð í bæ"
- 2014 – "Ég fyrirgef þér allt"
- 2024 – "Dansaðu"
- 2024 – "Ástarvalsinn"
- 2024 – "Tveir tveir fjórir"

== Related bibliography ==
- Gestur Guðmundsson (1990). Rokksaga Íslands. Forlagið. ISBN 9979-53-015-4.
