= Surprise Surprise (album) =

Studio album by Mezzoforte
- Released: 1982
- Recorded: 1982 July–August PRT Studios, London
- Genres: Jazz-Fusion, Jazz-Pop
- Length: 49:27
- Label: Steinar
- Producer: Geoff Calver

Mezzoforte chronology
Þvílíkt Og Annað Eins (1981)	Surprise Surprise (1982)	Observations (1983)

Singles from Surprise Surprise
- 1. "Garden Party" Released: 1983

Surprise Surprise is the 1982 studio album of Mezzoforte on Steinar. Their fourth album – originally released in Iceland as 4 with a different cover – made the band famous worldwide when, after the international release, the single "Garden Party" hit the charts.

== Background ==
Earlier in 1982, the second keyboard player, Bjorn Thorarensen who's been with them for their previous two albums, left Mezzoforte. The saxophone player Kristinn Svavarsson became a full member after playing as a guest on the band's first two albums. Surprise Surprise was recorded at PRT Studios, London in July–August 1982 and mixed at Red Bus Studios in September. It was the second time the band worked with producer Geoff Calver in London after the recording of their second album Í Hakanum – released internationally as Mezzoforte and re-released as Octopus in 1996 – in 1980. Despite gaining some popularity and playing concerts in the UK, the album was first released in Iceland in 1982 simply named 4 and then renamed Surprise Surprise for the international release.

== Cover ==
Surprise Surprise was originally released in Iceland as 4 with a different cover, but the record company decided to use the cover of Mezzoforte's third album – Þvílíkt Og Annað Eins, released only in Iceland – for the international release. The 1996 remastered version was released with the slightly modified international cover. This edition has a few discrepancies: Chris Hunter and Bill Eldridge are credited as trumpet and saxophone players respectively – this mistake was even present on the band's official website for a while – Eirikur Ingolfsson is not credited as percussionist, and Shady Calver is credited on her maiden name: Shady Owens.

Mezzoforte 4 Icelandic cover art

== "Garden Party" ==
"Garden Party" was chosen to be released as a single, even though the band wasn't sure whether to include the song on the album. It became Mezzoforte's biggest hit and charted in most European countries and Japan. After its success the band moved to England and started touring in Europe. "Garden Party" has been featured in TV programs and commercials, gaining even more publicity for Mezzoforte through the years. The song was covered by Herb Alpert in 1983.

== Track listing ==
No.	Title	Writer(s)	Icelandic title	Length
1.	"Surprise"	Eythor Gunnarsson	Fyrsta Paragraf (a)	1:25
2.	"Garden Party"	Eythor Gunnarsson	Sprett Úr Spori	6:00
3.	"Gazing At The Clouds"	Kristinn Svavarsson	Spáðu Í Skýin	6:30
4.	"Early Autumn"	Fridrik Karlsson	Undur Vorsins	6:17
5.	"Action Man"	Eythor Gunnarsson	Fjörkálfur	4:58
6.	"Funk Suite No.1"	Mezzoforte	Fönksvíta Nr. 1 Fyrir Trommur Og Hljómsveit	5:49
7.	"Easy Jack"	Fridrik Karlsson	Rólegur Jakob	4:45
8.	"Fusion Blues"	Fridrik Karlsson	Fusion Blues	5:40
9.	"The Old Neighborhood"	Fridrik Karlsson	Tilhugalíf Í Gamla Bænum	5:32
10.	"Surprise (Reprise)"	Eythor Gunnarsson	Fyrsta Paragraf (b)	0:50

== Charts ==
Album charts (weekly)
Chart (1982)	Peak position
UK Album Chart	23
Australia (Kent Music Report)	46
Dutch Album Top 100	10
German Top 100 Albums	33

Song charts
Year	Title	Chart peak positions				
Year	Title	UK	Australia (Kent Music Report)	NL	GER	BEL
1983	"Garden Party"	17	32	5	36	10

== Personnel ==
Mezzoforte:

- Fridrik Karlsson – Guitars (Yamaha and Ibanez electric, Ramirez acoustic), Percussion
- Eythor Gunnarsson – Keyboards (Rhodes, MiniMoog, Grand Piano, OBX-A, Jupiter 8, Prophet V, Roland Vocoder), Percussion
- Johann Asmundsson – Bass Guitars (JA-Special, Yamaha, Fender fretless), Percussion
- Gulli Briem – Drums (Premier drums), Percussion
- Kristinn Svavarsson – Saxophones (Yamaha alto, Selmer MK VI '58 tenor), Percussion

Additional musicians:

- Louis Jardim – Percussion
- Eirikur Ingolfsson – Percussion
- Shady Calver – Voice
- Chris Cameron – Voice
- Steve Dawson – Flugelhorn on Garden Party
- Winston Sela – OBX programming

Horns Section:

- Chris Hunter – Alto Saxophone, Tenor Saxophone
- Bill Eldridge – Trumpet
- Martin Dobson – Tenor Saxophone
- Stuart Brooks – Trumpet

Technical:

- Ernst J. Backman: Original International Artwork
- Geoff Calver: Producer, Engineer
- Jonatan Gardarsson: Editor
- Eirikur Ingolfsson: 1996 Liner notes
- Seventh Heaven: 1996 Artwork and design
- Oskar Pall Sveinsson: 1996 Digital Remaster

== Release history ==
Year	Format	Label	Country	Note
1982	LP	Steinar (Steinar 062)	Iceland	Titled 4
1982	LP	Steinar (Steinar LP02)	UK	—
1982	MC	Steinar (Steinar STEC02)	UK	—
1982	LP	Polydor (28MM0275)	Japan	—
1982	LP	Plaza Records (PZ001)	Australia, New Zealand	—
1982	LP	Polydor (811 724-1)	Germany	—
1982	CD	Polydor (811 724-2)	Germany	—
1983	LP	CGD (INT 20359)	Italy	—
1983	LP	CBS (S 25456)	Spain	—
1983	LP	Jump And Shout (JS 3301)	Belgium	—
1989	LP	RCA (NL 74131)	Germany	—
1989	CD	BMG (ND 74131)	Germany	—
1996	CD	CNR Music (2002973)	Netherlands	Remastered
1996	CD	ZYX Music (ZYX 10024-2)	Germany	Remastered
1996	CD	Record Express (REC 255103-2)	Hungary	Remastered
1996	SPOR Records (MEZZCD04)	Austria		Remastered
Steinar (CD STE 02)	Germany			Remastered
2020	LP	Quality Vinyl Projects (GR-150)	Netherlands	Re-mastered from original analogue master tapes
