= Þvílíkt Og Annað Eins =

Studio album by Mezzoforte
- Released: November 1981
- Recorded: October 1981 at Nova Suite, London
- Genre: Jazz-Fusion, Jazz-Pop
- Length: 39:20
- Label: Steinar
- Producer: Simon Heyworth

Mezzoforte chronology
Í Hakanum/Octopus (1980)	Þvílíkt Og Annað Eins (1981)	Surprise Surprise (1982)

Singles from Þvílíkt Og Annað Eins
- 1. "Dreamland / Shooting Star" Released: 1982

Þvílíkt Og Annað Eins is the 1981 studio album of Mezzoforte on Steinar. It is their third album, released only in Iceland only on LP. Along with their first record, Mezzoforte (1979), these two weren't remastered in 1996 with the rest of their early discography, or ever released internationally or on CD, however 7 of the 9 tracks from Þvílíkt Og Annað Eins were released internationally in 1983 on the compilation album Catching Up with Mezzoforte which also included 7 songs from their second album, Í Hakanum/Octopus and peaked at #95 on the UK Album Chart. Even though the third album’s title track was translated as Surprise, the album is sometimes referred to in English as Dreamland, which is the only song from the album released on a single, thus it can’t be confused with their fourth album, titled Surprise Surprise which was an international success, peaking at #23 on the UK Album Chart. The song Dreamland was released in 1982 on a double A-side single with second album’s Shooting Star.

== Cover ==
Mezzoforte’s fourth album was originally released in Iceland as 4, but the record company decided to use the cover of Þvílíkt Og Annað Eins for the international release, titled Surprise Surprise.

== Track listing ==
No.	Title	Writer(s)	Length
1.	"Uppstúf / Rise And Shine"	Mezzoforte	4:30
2.	"Þvílíkt Og Annað Eins / Surprise"	Eyþór Gunnarsson	0:30
3.	"Sykur Og Sætindi / Sugar And Sweets"	Friðrik Karlsson	4:00
4.	"Með Mátulega Hóflegri Bjartsýni / Modestly Optimistic"	Friðrik Karlsson	4:21
5.	"Greiðið Afnotagjöldin / Pay Your License"	Eyþór Gunnarsson	4:39
6.	"Ferðin Til Draumalandsins / Dreamland"	Friðrik Karlsson	4:41
7.	"Fagurgali / Sweet Nothings"	Eyþór Gunnarsson	6:05
8.	"Freðýsufönk / The Funky Fish Fillet"	Eyþór Gunnarsson	4:50
9.	"Gæsaræll / Goosebumps"	Friðrik Karlsson	4:00

== Personnel ==
Mezzoforte:

- Friðrik Karlsson – Guitar
- Eyþór Gunnarsson – Keyboard
- Björn Thorarensen – Keyboard
- Jóhann Ásmundsson – Bass
- Gunnlaugur Briem – Drums

Additional musicians:

- Louis Jardim – Percussion
- Ron Aspery – Alto and Tenor Saxophone (3, 5)

Technical:

- Simon Heyworth: Producer, Recording Engineer
- Ernst J. Backman: Cover Artwork
