= Julius Fridriksson =

VP for Research at the University of South Carolina

Vice President for Research of the University of South Carolina
- Incumbent
- Assumed office July 1, 2021
- President: Michael Amiridis
- Preceded by: Prakash Nagarkatti

Personal details
- Education: University of Central Florida; University of Arizona
- Scientific career
- Fields: Neuroscience, Aphasia, Cognitive Neuroscience, Stroke recovery, Neuroimaging

Julius Fridriksson is an Icelandic-American academic and scientist who is the Vice President for Research at the University of South Carolina (USC). He is also a SmartState Endowed Chair and Health Sciences Distinguished Professor in the Arnold School of Public Health at USC, and Director of the Aphasia Laboratory there.

Fridriksson's expertise and research center on the neurobiology of human communication, particularly focusing on the impacts of damage to the brain areas responsible for communication. He has been a faculty member and university leader at USC since 2001, garnering more than $50 million in research funding throughout that time, primarily from the National Institutes of Health.

== Early life and education ==
Julius Fridriksson was born in the coastal town of Keflavík, in southwest Iceland. His brother, Johann Fridrik Fridriksson is a member of the Icelandic parliament, Althing.

Julius was the first member of his family to graduate from college. In 1995, he earned a bachelor's degree in speech and hearing sciences from the University of Central Florida (UCF), where he went on to earn a master's degree in speech-language pathology in 1997. In 2001, Fridriksson completed his terminal degree, a Ph.D. in speech and hearing sciences from the University of Arizona (UA).

Fridriksson's early research career began in 1995 while he was earning his master's degree from UCF. From 1995 through 1997, he worked as a Graduate Research Assistant at UCF's Speech Science Laboratory in the Department of Communication Disorders.

After obtaining his master's degree, Fridriksson spent four years working as a speech-language pathologist, first at Avante Rehabilitation Center in Leesburg, Florida, from 1997 to 1998, and then at Kino Hospital in Tucson, Arizona, from 1999 to 2001, while he studied for his Ph.D. at UA.

== Career ==
Fridriksson was hired at USC in 2001, initially as an assistant professor in the Department of Communication Sciences and Disorders. Progressing through the faculty ranks, Fridriksson received tenure in 2007 and full professorship in 2011, followed by appointment as USC Health Sciences Distinguished Professor in the Department of Communication Sciences and Disorders in 2012.

== Research ==
As a neuroscientist, Fridriksson's research focuses primarily on the brain-based communication disorder, aphasia, which is typically caused by stroke or neurodegeneration (primary progressive aphasia). Aphasia is characterized by difficulty understanding or generating language because of injury to specific areas of the brain's left hemisphere that control communication. Fridriksson also has research interest and expertise in cognitive neuroscience, stroke recovery, stroke rehabilitation and neuroimaging. Over the course of his career, Fridriksson has garnered more than $50 million in research funding as a principal investigator (PI) to study aphasia and other areas of interest.

In 2016, Fridriksson received an $11.1 million P50 program project grant from the National Institute on Deafness and Other Communication Disorders to found and run the Center for the Study of Aphasia Recovery (C-STAR) for five years.

Fridriksson has also been the SmartState Endowed Chair of Memory and Brain Function since 2016.

== Leadership ==
Julius Fridriksson has been Vice President for Research at USC since July 1, 2021, succeeding Prakash Nagarkatti.

Fridriksson implemented several new research programs in his first two years in the Office of the Vice President for Research. The Propel Research Mentorship Program came first, offering professional development and support for faculty early in their research careers as they develop a complete grant proposal for submission to either the NIH or NSF. Over the course of one academic year, Propel provides a series of nine grant-writing workshops and pairs early-career faculty with more experienced senior researchers who can provide direct support. The first cohort of Propel mentees completed the program in spring 2022. By October 2023, Propel mentees had submitted about 175 grant applications and brought in more than $18 million in awards.

In 2023, Fridriksson pursued development of the USC Brain Health Network and Brain Health Center, securing state and federal funding to launch a network of satellite brain health clinics throughout South Carolina and build a cutting-edge hub for brain care and research in Columbia, South Carolina.

The Brain Health Network supports South Carolina patients experiencing cognitive symptoms of dementia by providing specialized screening and diagnostic services, along with neurologist-directed care plans a network of satellite clinics in rural and underserved areas around the state. This network meets a growing need in South Carolina for specialty care to support patients with Alzheimer's disease and other related dementias for which age is the greatest risk factor. The Brain Health Center in Columbia, slated to open in winter 2025-2026 will be equipped with a 7-tesla MRI scanner and a 3-tesla MRI scanner, spaces for infusion drug treatments and other facilities to treat and research dementias and other brain-based disorders. Fridriksson and university partners secured funding for this pair of projects in 2023. For the Brain Health Center, the state of South Carolina provided $30 million to renovate an existing facility, along with $5 million in recurring funds to support the Brain Health Network. Fridriksson and colleagues secured additional funding from the federal Health Resources and Services Administration to purchase MRI scanners for the Brain Health Center.

In 2023, Fridriksson worked with partners to form a coalition to pursue designation and funding through the U.S. Department of Commerce Economic Development Association's Regional Technology and Innovation Hub program, created by the bipartisan CHIPS and Science Act of 2022. The South Carolina Tech Hub project consortium came together in 2023 under the title South Carolina Nexus for Advanced Resilient Energy (SC Nexus). The statewide SC Nexus consortium includes more than 35 public and private member organizations led by the South Carolina State Department of Commerce. The University of South Carolina is a core member of SC Nexus. In October 2023, SC Nexus received the EDA's Tech Hub designation, and in 2024, the consortium applied for EDA Phase 2 funding to support its energy resiliency research and development efforts.

== Awards and honors ==
- UA Distinguished Alumnus Award, 2011
- Louis M. DiCarlo National Award for Clinical Advancement, American Speech and Hearing Foundation, 2011
- UCF Alumni Professional Achievement Award, 2013
- USC Breakthrough Leadership in Research Award, 2017
- SEC Faculty Achievement Award, 2018
