= Í hjarta mér =

Single by Egó

from the album 6. Október
- Released: February 19, 2009
- Recorded: January 5 – February 28, 2009 at Stúdíó Sýrland.
- Genre: Rock
- Length: 3:48
- Label: Sena
- Songwriter: Bubbi Morthens
- Producer: Bubbi Morthens

Egó singles chronology
"Kannski Varð Bylting Vorið 2009" (2009)	"Í hjarta mér" (2009)	"Fallegi Lúserinn Minn" (2009)

"Í hjarta mér" ("in my heart") is the second single from Egó's album 6. Október. The name of the band is sometimes stylized as EGÓ. The single released on February 19, 2009. The song became a big hit immediately and peaked at No. 1 on all charts in Iceland. The single was released as a Digital download only.

== Track listing ==
No.	Title	Length
1.	"Í Hjarta Mér"	3:48

== Personnel ==
- Arnar Geir Ómarsson – drums
- Bergþór Morthens – electric guitar
- Bubbi Morthens – vocals, electric guitar & acoustic guitar
- Hrafn Thoroddsen – orgel
- Jakob Magnússon – bass

== Charts ==
Chart 2009	Peak position
Tónlistinn	1
Vinsældalisti Rásar 2	1
Vinsældalisti Tónlist.is	1
Topp 10 á Bylgjunni	1
