= Mezzoforte (album) =

Studio album by Mezzoforte
- Released: November 1979
- Recorded: Hljóðriti Studios
- Genre: Jazz-Fusion, Jazz-Pop
- Length: 36:42
- Label: Steinar
- Producer: Gunnar Þórðarson

Mezzoforte chronology
Mezzoforte (1979)	Í Hakanum/Octopus (1980)

Mezzoforte is the debut album of Mezzoforte on Steinar, released only in Iceland in 1979. It consists of eight instrumental songs. Along with their third record, Þvílíkt Og Annað Eins (1981), these two weren't remastered in 1996 with the rest of their early discography, or ever released internationally or on CD.

== Background ==
Mezzoforte was founded in 1977 by four 15-17 year old musicians: Friðrik Karlsson, Eyþór Gunnarsson, Jóhann Ásmundsson and Gunnlaugur Briem. What brought them together was a shared interest in jazz and fusion music. Having played in Reykjavík (mainly in high schools) for just over a year they were offered a recording contract with Steinar Records and recorded their first album in Hljóðriti, the only 24 track studio in Iceland at that time. Simply titled Mezzoforte, it is the first Icelandic fusion album. The band was a five-piece band during the first years, Stefán S. Stefánsson played saxophone on the first album, but left soon after the release of the album. The band became well respected for their music and the members were in increased demand as session players and backing band members to vocalists. Some interest was also building up outside Iceland.

== Track listing ==
No.	Title	Writer(s)	Length
1.	"Kínahverfið"	Gunnar Þórðarson	5:17
2.	"Í Dagsins Önn"	Friðrik Karlsson	4:07
3.	"Kvöldstund Með Þér"	Friðrik Karlsson	4:57
4.	"Þeir Settu Svip Á Bæinn"	Stefán S. Stefánsson	5:10
5.	"Fyrirkomulagið"	Eyþór Gunnarsson	4:41
6.	"Gengið Á Jökulinn"	Friðrik Karlsson, Eyþór Gunnarsson, Gulli Briem, Jóhann Ásmundsson	4:53
7.	"Þegar Tangóinn Fékk Sér Nýjan Kjól"	Friðrik Karlsson	3:29
8.	"Sólroðinn"	Friðrik Karlsson, Eyþór Gunnarsson	4:08

== Personnel ==
Mezzoforte:

- Friðrik Karlsson – Guitar
- Eyþór Gunnarsson – Keyboards (Fender Rhodes, Mini-Moog, Yamaha Synthesizers, Hohner Clavinet)
- Jóhann Ásmundsson – Bass
- Gunnlaugur Briem – Drums, Percussion
- Stefán S. Stefánsson – Alto and Soprano Saxophone

Additional musicians on track 1, 2:

- Magnús Kjartansson - Trumpet
- Andrés Helgason – Trumpet
- Kristinn Svavarsson – Alto and Tenor Saxophone

Technical:

- Gunnar Þórðarson: Producer
- Gunnar Smári Helgason: Recording Engineer
- Gunnar Hannesson: Front Cover Photo
- Kristinn Ragnar Kristinsson: Back Cover Photos
- Pétur Halldorsson: Cover
