= Ðe lónlí blú bojs =

Icelandic folk band (1974–1976)

Ðe lónlí blú bojs (phonetically, "The Lonely Blue Boys") were an Icelandic folk music band created in 1974, and lasting until 1976. Their most popular album was the Icelandic Gold Record "Stuð, stuð, stuð". They only sang in Icelandic and were never popular abroad. Its members were:

- Gunnar Þórðarson (Guitar)
- Rúnar Júlíusson (Bass Guitar)
- Engilbert Jensen (Vocals)
- Björgvin Halldórsson (Vocals)
- Terry Doe (Drummer)

== Discography ==
=== Singles ===
- Ðe Lónlí blú bojs (1974) Diggy liggy lo
- Ðe Lónlí blú bojs (1975) Kærastan kemur til mín

=== Studio albums ===
- Stuð stuð stuð (1975)
- Hinn gullni meðalvegur (1975)
- Á ferð (1976)

=== Compilations ===
- Vinsælustu lögin (1976)
- 25 vinsælustu lögin (1989)
- Komplít (2005)
