= Kannski Varð Bylting Vorið 2009 =

Single by EGÓ
- Released: January 10, 2009
- Recorded: January 7, 2009 at Stúdíó Sýrland.
- Genre: Rock
- Length: 4:47
- Label: Sena
- Songwriter: Bubbi Morthens
- Producer: Bubbi Morthens

EGÓ singles chronology
"Kannski Varð Bylting Vorið 2009" (2009)	"Í Hjarta Mér"" (2009)

"Kannski Varð Bylting Vorið 2009" is EGÓ's first song in 25 years. It was released on January 10, 2009. Bubbi first performed the song at a radio show Poppland at Rás 2 on January 5. On January 7, EGÓ recorded the song at Stúdíó Sýrland. EGÓ also recorded another song by Bubbi called "Fallega Þú" but later got the name "Í Hjarta Mér". All of their albums have been recorded at Hljóðriti in Hafnarfjörður except that one. The single was released to promote EGÓ's upcoming album 6. Október but for some reason the song was not included on the album.

== Track listing ==
No.	Title	Length
1.	"Kannski Varð Bylting Vorið 2009"	4:47

== Personnel ==
- Arnar Geir Ómarsson – drums
- Bergþór Morthens – electric guitar
- Bubbi Morthens – vocals, electric guitar & acoustic guitar
- Hrafn Thoroddsen – orgel
- Jakob Magnússon – bass

== Charts ==
Chart 2009	Peak position
Tónlistinn	3
Tonlist.is – Netlistinn	3
