= Birna Arnbjörnsdóttir =

Icelandic academic

- Born: 1952 (age 73–74)

Academic background
- Education: University of Iceland (BA); University of Reading (MA); University of Texas at Austin (PhD)

Academic work
- Discipline: Linguist
- Sub-discipline: Second-language acquisition
- Institutions: Notre Dame College; University of Iceland

Birna Arnbjörnsdóttir (born 1952) is an Icelandic linguist. She is professor of second language studies at the University of Iceland, director of the Vigdís Finnbogadóttir Institute of Foreign Languages and dean of the Faculty of Languages and Cultures.

== Early life and education ==
Birna Arnbjörnsdóttir was born in 1952. Her parents, Arnbjörn Ólafsson (1922–2001) and Erna Vigfúsdóttir (1929–2019), were merchants in Keflavík, Iceland, where she was raised. Birna completed a Bachelor of Arts degree in English and French from the University of Iceland in 1976, a Master of Arts degree from the University of Reading in England in 1977, and a PhD in linguistics from the University of Texas at Austin in 1990.

== Professional career ==
From 1988 to 2000, Birna was assistant professor and later associate professor and director of TESL at Notre Dame College in New Hampshire and taught linguistics and English writing at the University of New Hampshire, University of Southern Maine and St. Anselm College in the United States. Birna came to the University of Iceland in 2000. She served as an assistant professor, then associate professor, and, from 2008, as professor of second language studies.

Birna's teaching has mostly been in applied linguistics and second-language acquisition.

== Research and development projects ==
Birna's research has mostly focused on language contact; bilingualism and multilingualism of individuals and communities and on Icelandic as a heritage language. In her Ph.D. thesis, Birna examined the linguistic and social factors that influenced the development of flámæli (apparent vowel mergers) in Icelandic as a heritage language in North America. The thesis was published by the University of Manitoba Press in 2006. Birna has been active in research on Icelandic as a heritage language and has published widely on that topic. She is one of the organisers of an international research network on heritage languages, WILA. Together with Höskuldur Þráinsson, Birna received a RANNÍS grant for the project, Heritage Language, Linguistic Change and Cultural Identity. The findings were published in Sigurtunga edited by Birna along with Höskuldur Þráinsson and Úlfar Bragason.

Birna and Hafdís Ingvarsdóttir directed a longitudinal project examining the influence of English in Iceland. The project, English as a Lingua Franca in Icelandic in a Changing Linguistic Environment, was also supported by RANNÍS. The results showed the enormous presence of English in Icelandic society and an overestimation on the part of speakers of their English language skills, which leads to difficulties in academic studies and work. The findings of that project were presented in the book, Language Development Across the Life Span, published by Springer in 2018. Birna is one of the leaders of the international research network, PRISEAL, on the writing and publication of academic articles in English as a second language and its effects on knowledge creation. Birna is also a participant in a project on the influence of English on Icelandic in a digital world.

Birna has led the development of Icelandic Online since its inception. The Icelandic Online website includes six courses with more than 5,000 learning objects at five skill levels. The courses are accessible by computers and smart devices, and are open and free of charge. Icelandic Online has contributed to improved access to Icelandic teaching all over the world. Icelandic Online was recognized by the Ministry of Education, Science and Culture in 2014 for its contribution to supporting the Icelandic language. The project received the Applied Science Prize of the University of Iceland and a recognition from the Icelandic Language Council in 2019. The instructional methodology and technical platform of Icelandic Online have been used to develop Faroese Online and Finland Swedish Online.

Birna has also participated in projects in the field of language technology with Hannes Högni Vilhjálmsson, Icelandic Language and Culture Training in Virtual Reykjavík, where virtual reality is used for language instruction.

Birna's latest research is a continuation of prior research. On the one hand, Birna leads the project Mót vestnorrænna tungumála (e. Language Contact in the West Nordic Region) along with Auður Hauksdóttir, which examines the intense contact between Danish and English and local languages, Greenlandic, Faroese and Icelandic. The project is supported by Nordplus – sprog. Another current project involves the development and evaluation of a new methodology in teaching English academic writing and literacy in higher education aimed at students in programs where English is the medium of instruction.

== Service ==
Birna has served her community in different ways. In the United States, she participated in developing educational programs for immigrants to New Hampshire. She served on numerous committees on educating second language learner children, for example, the New Hampshire Department of Education Ad Hoc Committee on Multicultural Affairs (1989–1991); The New Hampshire Professional Standards for Teachers Task Force (1999–2000); The Nashua, New Hampshire Title VII Advisory Council (1991); The Manchester, New Hampshire Title VII Advisory Council (1992); The New Hampshire Task Force on Diversity in the Health and Human Resources Sector (1998–2000).

Birna was president of the Northern New England Teachers of English to Speakers of Other Languages organization (NNETESOL) during 1998–2000 and served as the organization's representative to the TESOL International Association. Birna is the author of the first curriculum for Icelandic as a second language (1999) and pioneered the teaching of language for specific purposes through her company Fjölmenning (English: Multiculture), in collaboration with Ingibjörg Hafstað and the Icelandic unions. Birna is one of the founders of the organization, Móðurmál (English: Mother Tongue), which has the aim of strengthening the first language skills of children who migrate to Iceland.

Birna represented the humanities and social sciences on the University Council from 2006 to 2008, and served on the board of the National and University Library of Iceland 2006–2008 and on the board of the University of Iceland Computing Services 2012–2016. Birna has served on the board of the Vigdís Finnbogadóttir Institute of Foreign Languages from 2010; under its auspices is an international language centre which is a UNESCO Category II Centre. She became chair of the board of the Vigdís Finnbogadóttir Institute of Foreign Languages and its Director in 2018.

Birna is owner and acting chair of the board of RASK, a company that specializes in computer-assisted language teaching.

== Personal life ==
Birna has four children.

== Publications ==
- North American Icelandic : the linguistic and social context of vowel mergers, 1990
- Af stað : kennslubók í íslensku fyrir byrjendur, 2003
- North American Icelandic : the life of a language, 2006
- Integrasjon gjennom voksen- og videreutdanning : landrapport Island, 2010
- Language development across the life span : the impact of English on education and work in Iceland, 2017
