= Ingvarsdóttir =

Ingvarsdóttir is an Icelandic surname. Notable people with the surname include:

- Hafdís Ingvarsdóttir (fl. 1964), Icelandic professor
- Sigurlína Ingvarsdóttir (born 1978), Icelandic video game developer
