= Í Hakanum/Octopus =

Studio album by Mezzoforte
- Released: November 1980
- Recorded: mid August – mid October 1980 at Hot Ice Studios Hafnarfjörður, Iceland
- Genre: Jazz-Fusion, Jazz-Pop
- Length: 36:17
- Label: Steinar
- Producer: Geoff Calver

Mezzoforte chronology
Mezzoforte (1979)	Í Hakanum/Octopus (1980)	Þvílíkt Og Annað Eins (1981)

Singles from Í Hakanum/Octopus
- 1. "Dreamland / Shooting Star" Released: 1982; 2. "Midnight Express (live) / Midnight Express" Released: 1983

Í Hakanum is a 1980 studio album by Mezzoforte, released on Steinar and originally released in Iceland only. The September 1981 UK release, titled Mezzoforte, had a different cover artwork, but since their first album, released only in Iceland, too was called Mezzoforte, Í Hakanum was usually referred to as Octopus, which later became the title of the 1996 CD re-release.

Seven of the eight tracks were included in 1983 on the compilation album Catching Up With Mezzoforte which also included 7 songs from their third album, Þvílíkt Og Annað Eins and peaked at #95 on the UK Album Chart. The song Shooting Star was released in 1982 on a double A-side single with third album’s Dreamland. Midnight Express was released on a single in 1983 along with its live version from the Spelllifandi album.

== Background ==
Though still in their teens, members of Mezzoforte were already working as session musicians in Iceland, playing in various bands and backing singers. After their debut album as a quartett, Bjorn Thorarensen joined Mezzoforte as a second keyboard player. Í Hakanum was the first Mezzoforte album, produced by Geoff Calver. Recordings took place at Hot Ice Studios in Hafnarfjörður, Iceland from mid August to mid October 1980 with some additional recordings and mixing in London’s Red Bus Studios in late October. The album features Kristinn Svavarsson on sax, who became a full member of the band in 1982.

== Cover ==
The cover of Í Hakanum’s original Icelandic edition was changed for the international release. Since then the album was usually referred to as Octopus (see also the lead section), under which title it was re-released on CD in 1996 with its 1981 cover redesigned in accordance with the art concept of the reissue series. Ron Aspery’s surname is misspelled on all editions as Asprey.

Í Hakanum original Icelandic cover art

== Track listing ==
No.	Title	Writer(s)	Icelandic title	Length
1.	"Humoresque"	Eythor Gunnarsson, Fridrik Karlsson	Gletta	3:41
2.	"Midnight Express"	Fridrik Karlsson	Miðnæturhraðlestin	3:35
3.	"Danger High Voltage"	Eythor Gunnarsson, Johann Asmundsson	Háspenna Lifshætta	4:05
4.	"Octopus"	Eythor Gunnarsson	Eftirsjá	5:31
5.	"Shooting Star"	Eythor Gunnarsson, Johann Asmundsson	Stjörnuhrap	5:14
6.	"Northern Winds"	Fridrik Karlsson	Vindur Úr Suðri	5:32
7.	"Rendez-Vous"	Fridrik Karlsson	Fyrstu Kynni	5:57
8.	"Finale"	Mezzoforte	Niðurlagið	2:29

== Personnel ==
Mezzoforte:

- Fridrik Karlsson – Guitar (Yamaha electric, Martin acoustic, Eko classical)
- Eythor Gunnarsson – Keyboard (Rhodes, Mini-Moog, Yamaha and Roland Synthesizers)
- Johann Asmundsson – Bass (Yamaha electric, Kramer fretless)
- Gulli Briem – Drums (Premier drums, Gravier fire extinguisher)
- Bjorn Thorarensen – Keyboard (Roland Jupiter, ARP Odyssey)

Additional musicians:

- Kristinn Svavarsson – Saxophone (2, 7)
- Bobby Harrison – Congas (5) (Note: not credited on the 1981 and 1983 issues)
- Ellen Kristjánsdóttir – Voice (2, 5)
- Shady Owens – Voice (2, 5)
- Ron Aspery – Saxophone (3, 5)
- Louis Jardim – Percussion, Bits And Pieces Here And There
- Mezzoforte – Claps and snaps

Technical:

- Ernst J. Backman: Original International Artwork
- Geoff Calver: Producer, Engineer
- Jonatan Gardarsson: Editor
- Eirikur Ingolfsson – 1996 Liner notes
- Seventh Heaven: 1996 Artwork and design
- Oskar Pall Sveinsson: 1996 Digital Remaster

== Release history ==
Year	Format	Label	Country	Note
1980	LP	Steinar (Steinar 039)	Iceland	Titled Í Hakanum
1980	MC	Steinar (Steinar 039)	Iceland	Titled Í Hakanum
1981	LP	Steinar (Steinar LP01)	UK	Titled Mezzoforte
1983	LP	Steinar, Promusix (PRO S.T.L.P. 009)	Portugal	Titled Mezzoforte
1996	CD	CNR Music (2002975)	Netherlands	Titled Octopus, Remastered
1996	CD	ZYX Music (ZYX 10041-2)	Germany	Titled Octopus, Remastered
