= Hafdís =

Hafdís is a given name. Notable people with the name include:

- Hafdís Bjarnadóttir (born 1977), Icelandic composer
- Hafdís Helgadóttir (born 1965), Icelandic basketball player
- Hafdís Huld (born 1979), Icelandic singer
- Hafdís Ingvarsdóttir, Icelandic professor
- Hafdís Renötudóttir (born 1997), Icelandic handball player
- Hafdís Sigurðardóttir (born 1989), Icelandic racing cyclist
