= Thor's Hammer (band) =

Icelandic rock band

- Also known as: Hljómar
- Origin: Keflavík, Iceland
- Genres: Garage rock, fuzz rock, freakbeat
- Years active: 1963–1969, 1973-1974, 2003-2008
- Labels: Parlophone, Columbia, Big Beat

Thor's Hammer, or Hljómar, was an Icelandic rock band primarily active in the 1960s. Outside of Iceland, they are known among music collectors for their rare releases on Parlophone, sung in English and recorded in London for export. The most famous of these is the 1966 EP Umbarumbamba, regarded as one of the rarest released records in the world and known to fetch prices into the thousands of dollars when a copy surfaces. Their style can be described as garage rock, fuzz rock, and freakbeat, with noticeable influences from both The Who and The Beatles.

== History ==
Formed in Keflavik in 1963 under the name Hljómar (literally "Chords"), they soon became popular in Iceland at a time when local rock music was a rarity. By the mid-1960s they were recording in London on Parlophone Records for the international market, including the EP Umbarumbamba, now a valuable collector's item. This record was recorded as a tie-in with a movie starring the band also entitled Umbarumbamba, but the film was not a success. From these sessions also came the singles "Once" and "If You Knew". The band even attempted a single entitled "Stay" in the United States on Columbia Records, which was produced by John Simon, known for his work with The Band and Big Brother and the Holding Company's album Cheap Thrills with Janis Joplin.

In 1969 a number of Thor's Hammer members went on to form the prog-flavored band Trúbrot, which recorded four albums until itself splitting in 1973.

Continual interest in the band among collectors of 1960s rock music lead to the 2001 Ace Records compilation album From Keflavik With Love, which collects all of the band's English-language output, including the tracks from Umbarumbamba, "Once", "If You Knew", and "Stay", as well as a number of their Icelandic tracks.

Rúnar Júlíusson died on 5 December 2008 at the age of 63 after going into cardiac arrest.

The group's collected work is featured on the anthology, From Keflavík, With Love, released in 2001 on Big Beat Records.

== Band members ==
- Rúnar Júlíusson (13 April 1945 – 5 December 2008) – vocals, bass
- Gunnar Þórðarson – guitar, vocals
- Erlingur Björnsson (1966–1969) – guitar, vocals
- Engilbert Jensen – vocals, drums
- Shady Owens (1968–1969) – vocals
- Gunnar Jökull Hákonarson (1968) – drums
- Björgvin Halldórsson (1973–1974) – vocals
- Birgir Hrafnsson (1973–1974) – guitar
- Pétur Östlund (1966) – drums

== Discography ==
Studio albums

- 1967: Hljómar
- 1968: Hljómar (a second self-titled album)
- 1974: 74

Compilation albums

- Fyrsti kossinn - Hljómar í 50 ár

Singles and EPs

- 1965: Fyrsti Kossinn / Bláu Augun Þín
- 1965: Fjögur Ný Lög (EP)
- 1968: Hljómar (EP)
