= Steinar (name) =

Steinar is a common name in Norway and Iceland. The name originates from Proto-Scandinavian StainawarijaR which means "stone guardian".

It may refer to:

== Given name ==
- Steinar Baldursson (born 1995), simply known as Steinar, Icelandic singer
- Steinar Aase (born 1955), Norwegian football (soccer) player
- Steinar Dagur Adolfsson (born 1970), Icelandic football (soccer) player
- Steinar Amundsen (born 1945), Norwegian sprint canoer
- Steinar Aspli (born 1957), Norwegian politician
- Steinar Bastesen (born 1945), Norwegian politician
- Steinar Bjølbakk (born 1946), Norwegian ice hockey player
- Steinar Birgisson (born 1955), Icelandic handball player
- Steinar Bragi (born 1975), Icelandic writer
- Steinar Ege (born 1972), Norwegian handball player
- Steinar Gil (born 1943), Norwegian philologist and diplomat
- Steinar Gullvåg (born 1946), Norwegian politician
- Steinar Hansson (1947–2004), Norwegian journalist and publisher
- Steinar Hoen (born 1971), Norwegian high jumper
- Steinar Imsen (born 1944), Norwegian historian
- Steinar Johansen (born 1972), Norwegian speed skater
- Steinar Lem (1951–2009), Norwegian environmental activist, author
- Steinar Løding (born 1950), Norwegian novelist
- Steinar Lone (born 1955), Norwegian translator
- Steinar Sverd Johnsen (born 1972), Norwegian keyboardist and composer
- Steinar Maribo (born 1942), Norwegian politician
- Steinar Ness (born 1959), Norwegian politician
- Steinar Nilsen (born 1972), Norwegian football coach
- Steinar Ofsdal (born 1948), Norwegian composer, musician, flute player
- Steinar Opstad (born 1971), Norwegian poet
- Steinar Pedersen (born 1975), Norwegian football (soccer) player
- Steinar Pedersen (politician) (born 1947), Norwegian politician
- Steinar Raknes (born 1975), Norwegian jazz musician
- Steinar Reiten (born 1963), Norwegian politician
- Steinar Schjøtt (1844-1920), Norwegian educator, philologist and lexicographer
- Steinar Stjernø (born 1945), Norwegian academic
- Steinar Stokke (born 1955), Norwegian businessperson and former civil servant
- Steinar Tenden (born 1978), Norwegian football (soccer) player
- Steinar Tjomsland (born 1948), Norwegian Supreme Court Justice
- Steinar Aadnekvam (born 1984), Norwegian jazzguitarist

== Middle name ==
- Árni Steinar Jóhannsson (1953–2015), Icelandic politician
- Håkon Steinar Giil (born 1943), Norwegian politician
- Odd Steinar Holøs (1922–2001), Norwegian politician
- Olav Steinar Namtvedt (born 1947), Norwegian politician
- Per Steinar Osmundnes (born 1980), Norwegian politician

== See also ==
- Steinar (disambiguation)
