= Ég er kominn heim =

1960 song by Óðinn Valdimarsson

Single by Óðinn Valdimarsson and K.K. sextettinn

from the album Óðinn
- A-side: "14 ára"
- Released: 1960
- Studio: RÚV
- Length: 3:15
- Label: Íslenzkir tónar
- Songwriter: Jón Sigurðsson
- Producer: Jón Sigurðsson

Music video
- "Ég er kominn heim" on YouTube

"Ég er kominn heim" is a song performed by the Icelandic singer Óðinn Valdimarsson and the band K.K. sextettinn. The song is originally a number (Heut’ nacht hab’ ich geträumt von dir) from the operetta Das Veilchen vom Montmartre by Hungarian composer Emmerich Kálmán; the Icelandic lyrics are unrelated to the original lyrics and were written by banker and songwriter Jón Sigurðsson. It was released in 1960 on the album Óðinn. The song gained a resurgence after being covered by Björgvin Halldórsson on his 2003 album Íslandslög 6. In 2008, the song was covered by Bubbi Morthens and Björn Jörundur Friðbjörnsson. By the 2010s, the song had become an unofficial song of the Icelandic national teams, being performed noticeably during the 2015 EuroBasket, the 2016 European Men's Handball Championship, UEFA Euro 2016 and the 2018 FIFA World Cup.
