= From Keflavík, With Love =

Compilation album by Thor's Hammer
- Released: 2001
- Recorded: 1960s
- Genre: Beat music, garage rock, freakbeat, psychedelic
- Length: 53:37

From Keflavík, With Love is a retrospective anthology issued in 2001 by Big Beat Records consisting of twenty songs by Thor's Hammer (Hljómar), a 1960s garage rock and beat group from Iceland who were one of the best-known Icelandic groups during the era. Though they worked with different producers on various labels, Thor's Hammer sound is best-typified by the tough, aggressive fuzz-drenched rockers they recorded in London for Parlophone Records in 1966, such as "I Don't Care," "My Life," "Better Days," and "The Big Beat Country Dance", and "If You Knew". While the lyrics to most of their songs were sung in English, several tracks were recorded in their native Icelandic, such as "Fyrsti Kossinn", "Ef Hún Er Nálægt Mér", and "Ertu Med", which was covered by the Savages on their Live 'n Wild album. Some of the tracks from Thor's Hammer's final period in the late 1960s, such as "Stay", show the group stretching their sound stylistically, augmenting certain arrangements with keyboards and horns. At his time, Thor's Hammer moved into a more eclectic direction, but they broke up in 1969, with several of their members going on to join the progressive rock group, Trubrot.

== Track listing ==
1. "If You Knew" 2:25
2. "I Don't Care" 2:43
3. "Better Days" 2:41
4. "By the Sea" 2:00
5. "The Big Beat Country Dance" 2:00
6. "Love Enough" 3:07
7. "My Life" 2:21
8. "A Memory" 2:39
9. "Once" 3:19
10. "Fyrsti Kossinn" 2:11
11. "Ef Hún Er Nálægt Mér" 2:09
12. "Show Me You Like Me" 3:10
13. "Minningin Um Thig" 3:04
14. "Ertu Med" 2:34
15. "Kvöld Vid Keflavik" 2:23
16. "Stay" 2:26
17. "By the Sea" 2:33
18. "Heyrdu Mig Góda" 2:35
19. "Thu Og Ég" 3:09
20. "Midsumarnótt" 4:08

== Catalogue and release information ==
- From Keflavík, With Love (Big Beat CDWIKD 206, 2001)
