= Jón Jónsson =

Icelandic singer (born 1985)

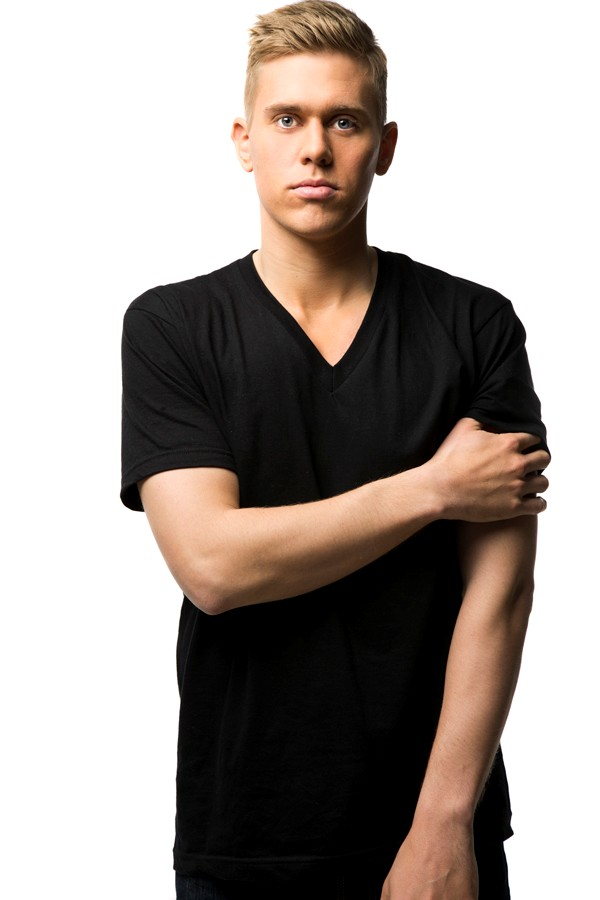

Background information
- Born: Jón Ragnar Jónsson; 30 October 1985 (age 41); Hafnarfjörður, Iceland
- Genres: Pop; blues
- Occupation: Singer
- Years active: 2010–present
- Label: Epic
- Website: jonjonsson.is

Jón Ragnar Jónsson (born 30 October 1985) is an Icelandic singer. He was signed by Epic Records and has released three albums, Wait for Fate (2011), Heim (2014), and Lengi lifum við (2021).

== Life and career ==
Jón has been a performer since the age of 10. He is a native of Iceland. His brother is pop singer Friðrik Dór. He started music in his local music school in Iceland and took part in productions in high school and college. He studied in Boston University on a soccer scholarship. While in college, he pursued acting while writing, recording, and performing his own music at local venues.

After graduating in 2009, Jón returned to Iceland and became a professional musician. He cooperates with Kristján Bjarnason who takes part in arrangements and recording of Jón Jónsson's music in their studio. His first singles "Lately" and "Kiss in the Morning" had considerable radio play and his third single "When You're Around" reached number 2 in Lagalistinn Top 30 followed by "Sooner or Later".

Debut album was released on 4 July 2011 called Wait for Fate and was certified gold. "Get In" his fifth single reached number 2 on "Lagalistinn". Another single "All, You, I" was a non-album release. He took part in a number of festivals including Icelandic Culture Night, the Icelandic Independence Day, and the Þjóðhátíð Music Festival.

In August 2012, Jón traveled to New York with his friend, Kristján Bjarnason, and after an audition with L.A. Reid was signed to Reid's Epic Records label.

Jón's first four singles were in the top 30 on Iceland music charts and he also received a People's Choice Award as the Best New Artist from Iceland's FM 957. His songs are heard in regular rotation on radio and some have reached top 10 on Bylgjan and Rás 2 radio as well as the Icelandic Billboard.

He was signed by Epic Records after he was said to impress record producer L.A. Reid.

In addition to his music career, Jón is the editor-in-chief of Monitor, a youth weekly for Monitor. He is active in awareness campaigns for various causes.

He lent his voice to the main character in the Icelandic voice-over for the animated feature, The Lorax.

== Music style ==
Jón has been referred to as the European version of Jack Johnson, John Mayer, and Gavin DeGraw. His music contains a mix of pop and R&B with undertones of R&B. His songs range from romantic lyric ballads to piano and guitar driven pop.

== Band ==
- Kristján Bjarnason - piano, keyboards, arrangements
- Steini Gudjonsson - electric guitar
- Brynjar Unnsteinsson - bass
- Andri Bjartur Jakobsson - drums

== Awards and nominations ==
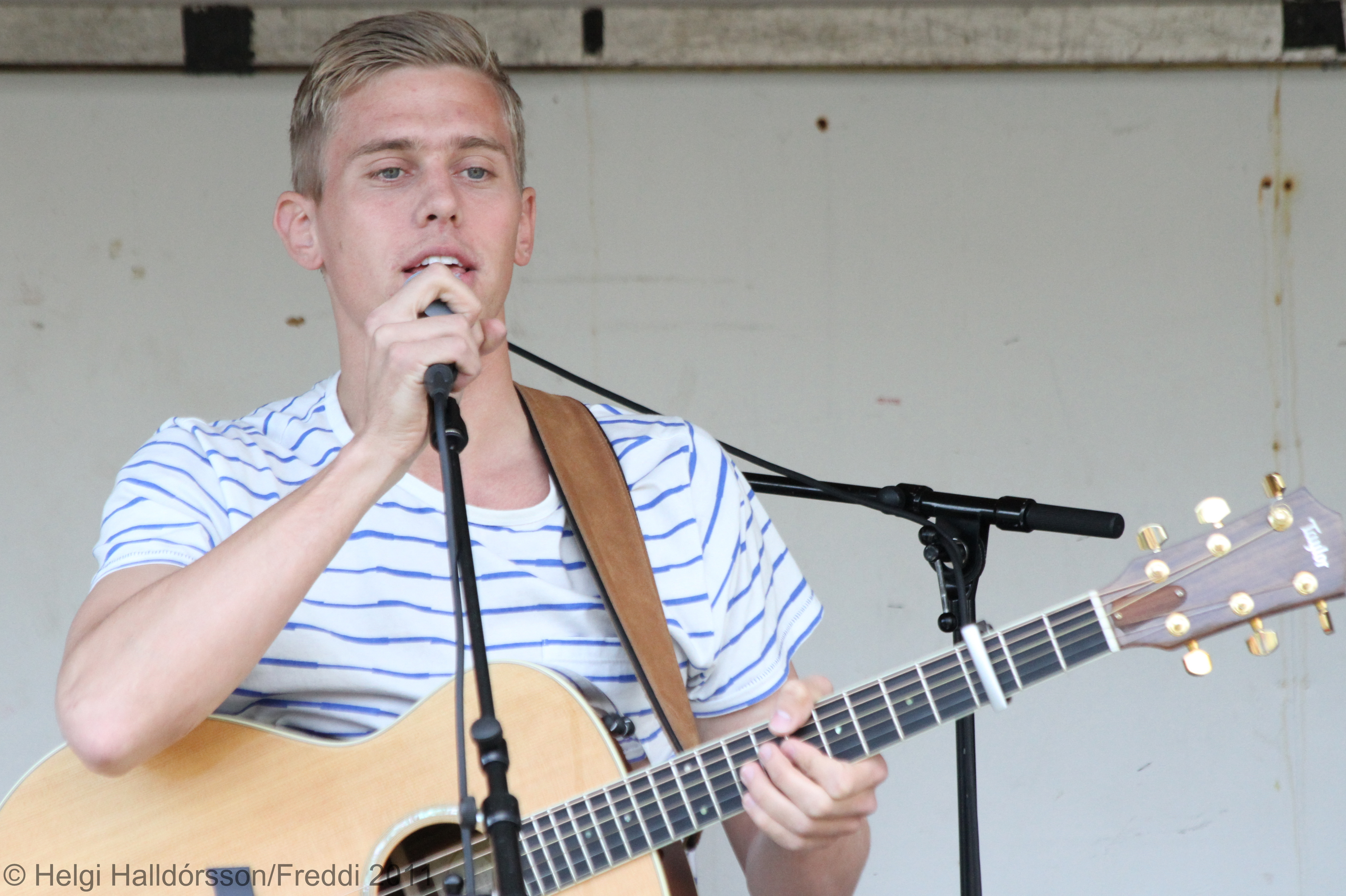
Jón Jónsson in 2011

- Won "Best Newcomer" in People's Choice Awards in Iceland by popular vote.
- February 2012: Nomination for "Most promising Icelandic act" during the Icelandic Music Awards. The award was won by Of Monsters and Men.

== Discography ==
(From Tónlist official Icelandic Music Charts)

- 2011: Wait for Fate

Tracklist

1. "Wanna Get In" (2:54)
2. "Kiss in the Morning" (3:42)
3. "Sooner or Later" (3:48)
4. "Always Gonna Be There" (3:51)
5. "Sunny Day in June" (2:41)
6. "Little Tree" (4:06)
7. "When You're Around" (3:43)
8. "Lately" (3:56)
9. "Wait for Fate" (4:32)
10. "To Her" (4:26)
11. "Ocean Girl" (4:10)
12. "Miss You So" (5:06)
- 2014: Heim

Tracklist

1. "Heim" (4:23)
2. "Ykkar koma" (3:11)
3. "Heltekur minn hug" (3:27)
4. "Gefðu allt sem þú átt" (3:27)
5. "Dag eftir dag" (3:28)
6. "Saman" (3:46)
7. "Sátt" (4:32)
8. "Engin eftirsjá" (3:56)
9. "Lífsins lausnir" (3:34)
10. "Endurgjaldslaust" (5:26)
11. "Gæti þín" (3:00)
12. "Segðu já" (2:56)
13. "Feel For You" (4:00)
14. "Ljúft að vera til" (3:34)
15. "All, You, I" (3:51)
- 2021: Lengi lifum við

=== Singles ===
- 2010: "Lately"
- 2010: "Aron, Axel og Alex"
- 2010: "Kiss in the Morning"
- 2011: "When You're Around"
- 2011: "Sooner or Later"
- 2012: "All, You, I"
- 2013: "Feel for You"
- 2014: "Kæri vinur" (duet with Björgvin Halldórsson)
- 2014: "Ljúft að vera til"
- 2014: "Gefðu allt sem þú átt"
- 2015: "Ykkar koma"

== Football career ==
Jón Jónsson
Personal information
- Position: Defender

Senior career*
Years	Team	Apps	(Gls)
2005	FH	0	(0)
2006	→ Þróttur Reykjavík	4	(0)
2007–2009	Þróttur Reykjavík	39	(0)
2010–2015	FH	61	(1)
2017	FH	8	(0)
Total		112	(1)
- * Club domestic league appearances and goals

Jón came up through the junior teams of FH. He played his first match in the Icelandic top-tier Úrvalsdeild karla in 2008 for Þróttur Reykjavík. He rejoined FH in 2009 and played there, with the exception of 2016, until 2017. He won the Icelandic championship with the team in 2012 and 2015. He announced his retirement from football in January 2018.
