= Windfall (Rick Nelson album) =

Studio album by Rick Nelson and The Stone Canyon Band
- Released: January 10, 1974
- Recorded: 1974
- Genre: Country rock
- Length: 34:17
- Label: MCA
- Producer: Rick Nelson

Rick Nelson and The Stone Canyon Band chronology
Garden Party (1972)	Windfall (1974)	Intakes (1977)

Windfall is a 1974 country rock album by Rick Nelson and the Stone Canyon Band, Nelson's twenty-first solo studio album.

The album debuted on the Billboard Top LPs & Tape chart in the issue dated February 23, 1974, and remained on the chart for four weeks, peaking at number 190. The singles from the album debuted on the Cashbox Singles looking ahead chart on February 23, 1974, peaking at number 116 during a two-week stay. The song peaked at number 46 the adult contemporary chart during a two-week stay. "One Night Stand" spent two weeks on the Hot Country Singles & Tracks charts, peaking at number 89. "Lifestream" spent three weeks on the Cashbox Singles looking ahead chart, peaking at number 105.

The album was released on compact disc by Beat Goes On on March 13, 2002, as tracks 11 through 20 on a pairing of two-albums-on-one CD with tracks 1 through 10 consisting of Nelson's 1972 album, Garden Party. Bear Family included also the album in the 2010 The Last Time Around box set.

== Background ==
Jay DeWitt White wrote "How Many Times". Baker Knight "I Don't Want to Be Lonely One". Dennis Larden "Legacy", "Evil Woman Child", "One Night Stand", "Don't Leave Me Here", and "Windfall" (co-written with Nelson)", Nelson arranged the songs for the album and wrote three songs: "Someone to Love", "Lifestream", & "Windfall" (co-written with Larden)"

== Critical reception ==
Professional ratings
Review scores
Source	Rating
AllMusic	4/5 stars
The Encyclopedia of Popular Music	2/5 stars

Bruce Eder of AllMusic said that the album "showed [Nelson], displaying more confidence than he'd had since the mid-1960s, delved not only into some achingly beautiful corners of country-rock, but also harder rocking territory and also more soul and funk-oriented sounds than anyone believed possible."

Billboard described the album as "the urban form of country pop music" and stated that "such tunes as "How Many Times" and a marked contrast in "Evil Ways" with its driving rhythm and wah wah guitar solo."

Rolling Stone gave the album a mostly positive review, praising two of Nelson's contributions, "Lifestream" and "Someone to Love."

== Track listing ==
1. "Legacy" (Dennis Larden) – 3:24
2. "Someone to Love" (Rick Nelson) – 3:58
3. "How Many Times" (Jay DeWitt White) – 4:42
4. "Evil Woman Child" (Larden) – 3:45
5. "Don't Leave Me Here" (Larden) – 2:44
6. "Wild Nights in Tulsa" (Don Burns, Riley Wildflower) – 3:32
7. "Lifestream" (Nelson) – 2:40
8. "One Night Stand" (Larden) – 3:17
9. "I Don't Want to Be Lonely Tonight" (Thomas Baker Knight) – 3:15
10. "Windfall" (Nelson, Larden) – 3:00

== Charts ==
Chart (1974)	Peak position
US Top LPs (Billboard)	190
Australia (Kent Music Report)	61

== Personnel ==
- Ricky Nelson – guitar, lead vocals
- Dennis Larden – lead guitar, backing vocals
- Tom Brumley – steel guitar
- Jay DeWitt White – bass guitar, backing vocals
- Ty Grimes – drums

=== Production ===
- Producer: Rick Nelson
- Recording engineer: Michael "Nemo" Shields
- Photography: John Longenecker
- Artistic design: Kristen Nelson
