= Mezzoforte (band) =

Icelandic jazz fusion group

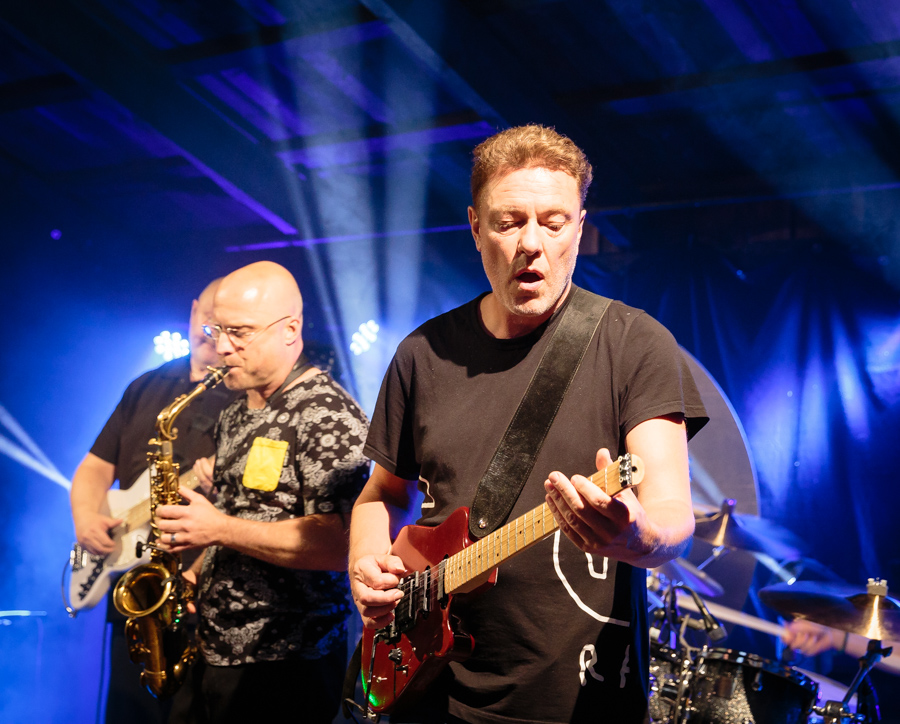
Mezzoforte at the 2017 Kongsberg Jazzfestival. Closest to the camera is Friðrik Karlsson.

Mezzoforte is an instrumental jazz-funk fusion band from Iceland, formed in 1977.

They signed a record deal with Icelandic label Steinar. Their biggest hit single was "Garden Party" (1983), taken from their fourth album (second international release) Surprise Surprise. It peaked at number 17 in the UK Singles Chart. The solo that takes place two minutes into "Garden Party", was created and played on the flugelhorn by English trumpeter, Stephen Dawson. "Garden Party" was later covered by Herb Alpert, at a slower speed than the original, apparently as he had learned the track from the single played at the wrong speed. Another single, "Rockall" spent one week at number 75 in the same listing in June that year, and was used as a signature tune by several European radio chart shows.

The band was named after the traditional musical term mezzo forte, an instruction to play literally "moderately loud".

Saxophonist Kristinn Svavarsson died in January 2026, at the age of 78.

== Band members ==
Original line-up from 1977:

- Eyþór Gunnarsson – keyboards
- Jóhann Ásmundsson – bass
- Gunnlaugur Briem-Gulli Briem (Gulli) – drums
- Friðrik Karlsson (Frissi) – guitars

Other members, present and past:

- Bruno Müller – guitars (2005–2014)
- Sebastian Studnitzky – trumpet & keyboards (2005–present)
- Thomas Dyani – percussion (2004–present)
- Jonas Wall – saxophones (2013–present)
- Ari Bragi Karason – trumpet
- Staffan William-Olsson – guitars (2003–2004)
- Joel Palsson – saxophones (2003)
- Guðmundur Pétursson – guitars (2003)
- Óskar Guðjónsson – saxophones (1996–2003, 2005–2013)
- Kåre Kolve – saxophones (1991–1994)
- Björn Thorarensen – synthesizers (1980–1982)
- Kristinn Svavarsson – saxophones (1982–1985; died 2026)
- David O'Higgins – saxophones (1985–1989, 2002–2004)
- Jeroen De Rijk – percussion (1984–1986)

== Discography ==
=== Albums ===
==== Studio albums ====
Title	Album details	Peak chart positions							
Title	Album details	ICE	AUS	GER	NL	NOR	SWE	SWI	UK
Mezzoforte	Released: November 1979; Label: Steinar; Formats: LP, MC	10	—	—	—	—	—	—	—
Í Hakanum	Released: November 1980; Label: Steinar; Formats: LP, MC; Released outside of Iceland as Mezzoforte	—	—	—	—	—	—	—	—
Þvílíkt Og Annað Eins	Released: November 1981; Label: Steinar; Formats: LP	—	—	—	—	—	—	—	—
Surprise Surprise	Released: October 1982; Label: Steinar; Formats: LP, MC; Released outside of Iceland as Surprise Surprise	1	46	33	10	—	—	—	28
Yfirsýn	Released: December 1983; Label: Steinar; Formats: CD, LP, MC; Released outside of Iceland as Observations	7	—	39	—	6	46	23	—
Rising	Released: November 1984; Label: Steinar; Formats: CD, LP, MC	10	—	—	—	—	—	—	—
No Limits	Released: November 1986; Label: Steinar; Formats: CD, LP, MC	9	—	—	—	12	—	—	—
Playing for Time	Released: April 1989; Label: RCA; Formats: CD, LP, MC	8	—	—	—	5	—	—	—
Daybreak	Released: November 1993; Label: Spor; Formats: CD, MC	—	—	—	—	—	—	—	—
Monkey Fields	Released: July 1996; Label: Spor; Formats: CD, MC	7	—	—	—	—	—	—	—
Forward Motion	Released: November 2004; Label: BHM Productions; Formats: CD	—	—	—	—	—	—	—	—
Volcanic	Released: 18 October 2010; Label: Koolmusik, BHM Productions; Formats: CD, digital download	—	—	—	—	—	—	—	—
Islands	Released: 6 July 2012; Label: BHM Productions; Formats: CD, digital download	—	—	—	—	—	—	—	—
"—" denotes releases that did not chart or were not released in that territory.

=== Live albums ===
Title	Album details	Peak chart positions
Title	Album details	ICE
Sprellifandi	Released: September 1983; Label: Steinar; Formats: LP, MC; Live at the Dominion on 30 June 1983	1
Live in Reykjavik	Released: November 2008; Label: BHM Productions; Formats: 2xCD	—
Live from London	Released: 2 August 2016; Label: The Store for Music; Formats: digital download	—
"—" denotes releases that did not chart.

==== Compilation albums ====
Title	Album details	Peak chart positions	
Title	Album details	ICE	UK
Catching up with Mezzoforte – Early Recordings	Released: May 1983; Label: Steinar; Formats: CD, LP, MC	—	95
The Saga So Far	Released: October 1985; Label: Steinar; Formats: CD, LP, MC	4	—
Best Collection	Released: 1 June 1987; Label: Polydor; Formats: CD; Japan-only release	—	—
Fortissimos	Released: September 1991; Label: RCA/BMG; Formats: CD, LP, MC	7	—
Garden Party Time – The Best of Mezzoforte	Released: 22 November 1999; Label: Skífan/Íslenskir Tónar; Formats: 2xCD	—	—
The Very Best of Mezzoforte	Released: 24 October 2001; Label: Skífan; Formats: CD, MC	—	—
Anniversary Edition	Released: April 2007; Label: BHM Productions; Formats: 2xCD	—	—
"—" denotes releases that did not chart or were not released in that territory.

==== Video albums ====
Title	Album details
High Voltage	Released: 1985; Label: Castle Hendring; Formats: VHS
Live in Reykjavik	Released: November 2008; Label: BHM Productions; Formats: DVD
Live from London – Live from the Marquee Club	Released: May 2013; Label: The Store for Music; Formats: DVD

=== Singles ===
Title	Year	Peak chart positions						
Title	Year	ICE	AUS	BE (FL)	GER	IRE	NL	UK
"Dreamland"/"Shooting Star"	1982	—	—	—	—	—	—	—
"Garden Party"	1983	8	32	10	36	23	5	17
"Rockall"	1983	—	—	31	—	—	43	75
"Midnight Express" (live)	1983	—	—	—	—	—	—	—
"Midnight Sun"	1984	—	—	—	—	—	—	102
"Spring Fever"	1984	—	—	—	—	—	—	100
"Take Off	1984	—	—	—	—	—	—	—
"Taking Off" (vocal mix)	1985	—	—	—	—	—	—	—
"Garden Party" (sunshine mix)	1985	—	—	—	—	—	—	—
"This Is the Night" (featuring Noel McCalla)	1985	—	—	—	—	—	—	—
"Nothing Lasts Forever" (featuring Noel McCalla)	1986	—	—	—	—	—	—	—
"No Limit"	1987	—	—	—	—	—	—	—
"Expressway"	1989	—	—	—	—	—	—	—
"High Season"	1989	—	—	—	—	—	—	—
"Better Love"	1991	—	—	—	—	—	—	—
"After Hours"	1994	—	—	—	—	—	—	—
"Step Right Back"	1996	—	—	—	—	—	—	—
"Monkey Fields"	1996	—	—	—	—	—	—	—
"Garden Party" (2002 remix)	2002	—	—	—	—	—	—	—
"Hún veit hvað ég vil" (with Auður)	2020	—	—	—	—	—	—	—
"Broke n Hip"	2021	—	—	—	—	—	—	—
"—" denotes releases that did not chart or were not released in that territory.
