= Ragnheiður =

Opera in three acts

Ragnheiður is an opera in three acts by Gunnar Þórðarson to an Icelandic libretto by Friðrik Erlingsson. It tells the story of the romantic relationship between Ragnheiður, daughter of the Icelandic bishop Brynjólfur Sveinsson, and her teacher Daði Halldórsson, based on events that took place at the episcopal See of Skálholt in the 17th century. First performed in concert on 16 August 2013 at the cathedral in Skálholt, it premiered at the Harpa concert hall in Reykjavík as a staged production of the Icelandic Opera on 1 March 2014.

== Conception and performance history ==
In the spring of 2007, composer Gunnar Þórðarson approached author Friðrik Erlingsson with the idea of writing an opera. They settled on the historic story of Ragnheiður Brynjólfsdóttir, known by the four-volume novel Skálholt (1930–1932) by Icelandic author Guðmundur Kamban, described by the Encyclopædia Britannica as his “greatest work”. Earlier – 1929 – Kamban had already published an article about Ragnheiður and her teacher Daði Halldórsson in the magazine Skírnir.

Gunnar Þórðarson and Friðrik Erlingsson started working on the opera in spring 2010 and finished three years later, in spring 2013. In August 2013, three performances of the opera were given in concert in the Cathedral of Skálholt. On 1 March 2014, the opera premiered as a staged production at the Harpa Concert Hall in Reykjavík, with many performers reprising their role from the concert performances in Skálholt (among them Petri Sakari as conductor and the singers Þóra Einarsdóttir and Viðar Gunnarsson in the roles of Ragnheiður and her father Brynjólfur). There were nine sold-out performances with about 13000 spectators.

The performances in Harpa were positively received by the Icelandic and international media, being nominated in ten categories at the Icelandic Performing Arts Award Gríman and winning three: Music of the Year for Gunnar Þórðarson, Singer of the Year for Elmar Gilbertsson and Performance of the Year.

In December 2014, two additional performances were given, which raised the total number of people as having seen the Opera in Harpa to about 15000, making it at the time the third most attended opera performance in Iceland after The Gypsy Baron and The Magic Flute.

== Roles ==
Role	Voice type	Skálholt cast, 16 August 2013 (Conductor: Petri Sakari)	Reykjavík cast, 1 March 2014 (Conductor: Petri Sakari)
Ragnheiður Brynjólfsdóttir	soprano	Þóra Einarsdóttir	Þóra Einarsdóttir
Brynjólfur Sveinsson, bishop in Skálholt	bass	Viðar Gunnarsson	Viðar Gunnarsson
Daði Halldórsson, bishop’s secretary and Ragnheiður’s teacher	tenor	Eyjólfur Eyjólfsson	Elmar Gilbertsson
Sigurður Torfason, dean of Skálholt cathedral	bass	Jóhann Smári Sævarsson	Jóhann Smári Sævarsson
Helga Magnúsdóttir, Ragnheiður’s aunt	contralto	Alina Dubik	Elsa Waage
Ingibjörg Magnúsdóttir, a maid	mezzo-soprano	Guðrún Jóhanna Ólafsdóttir	Guðrún Jóhanna Ólafsdóttir
Hallgrímur Pétursson, a poet and a priest	baritone	Bergþór Pálsson	Bergþór Pálsson
Torfi Jónsson, archdeacon	baritone	Jóhann Kristinsson	Ágúst Ólafsson
Þórður Þorláksson, later bishop in Skálholt	tenor	Björn Ingiberg Jónsson	Björn Ingiberg Jónsson
Workers, students, beggars, church congregation

== Synopsis ==
=== Act 1 ===
There are rumours in Skálholt, that Ragnheiður, daughter of bishop Brynjólfur Sveinsson, has an illicit affair with her teacher Daði Halldórsson. The dean of the cathedral, Sigurður Torfason, tells the bishop of these rumours, hoping it would lead Brynjólfur to send Daði away; however, bishop Brynjólfur decides instead to let Ragnheiður take a public oath, affirming her virginity.

On 11 May 1661, Ragnheiður takes the oath in front of the congregation in the cathedral of Skálholt. Afterwards she goes to Daði's quarters and sleeps with him.

=== Act 2 ===
Ragnheiður spends the time of her pregnancy at her aunt Helga Magnusdóttir's farm in Bræðratunga. Daði leaves for Copenhagen to plead his case before the king.

After giving birth to her son nine months after taking the oath affirming her virginity, Ragnheiður's father Brynjólfur orders her to come back to Skálholt and face a public absolution on 20 April 1662; the child, however, is to be sent to foster parents.

In exchange for a royal pardon for Ragnheiður, Brynjólfur wants to send the king the Poetic Edda, an old manuscript ascribed by Brynjólfur to Sæmundr the Learned, a 12th-century Icelandic priest. However, Brynjólfur discovers, that dean Sigurður has already taken the manuscript to the king on his own account.

Ragnheiður dies in 1663, without having seen Daði or her son again. Hallgrímur Pétursson recites the psalm of Death's uncertain hour over her body.

=== Act 3 (Epilogue) ===
Ten years later, Brynjólfur visits the graves of his daughter, Ragnheiður, and his only grandchild, Ragnheiður's and Daði's son. Daði arrives at the graveyard and – not recognised by Brynjólfur – asks him, for whom Brynjólfur is weeping. Hearing the answer Daði realises, that his child – whom he had never seen – has died.

== Recording ==
2014 – Petri Sakari conducting the Iceland Symphony Orchestra, with Þóra Einarsdóttir (Ragnheiður), Viðar Gunnarsson (Brynjólfur), Elmar Gilbertsson (Daði), Jóhann Smári Sævarsson (Sigurður), Hanna Dóra Sturludóttir (Helga), Guðrún Jóhanna Ólafsdóttir (Ingibjörg), Bergþór Pálsson (Hallgrímur), Ágúst Ólafsson (Torfi) and Björn Ingiberg Jónsson (Þórður). Actone 3 CD.
