= Utangarðsmenn =

Icelandic punk band

Utangarðsmenn (literally Outsiders in Icelandic) was an Icelandic punk band formed in 1979 and was most active in the early 1980s, becoming one of the most popular bands in the country for that period.

The band was composed Bubbi Morthens, Mick Pollock, Danny Pollock, Magnús Stefánsson and Rúnar Erlingsson. They released two albums; Geislavirkir in 1980 and Í upphafi skyldi endinn skoða in 1981 and one mini album 45RPM in 1981. Utangarðsmenn had a brief comeback in 2000 and release of compilation album Fuglinn er floginn.

Their song Kyrrlátt kvöld ("Tranquil Evening") was used as the opening music for the 2007 series Næturvaktin, ("Night Shift") which also used the song Jón pönkari ("John the Punk") by Bubbi Morthens (the former member of Utangarðsmenn) to close each episode.

== Discography ==
=== Albums ===
Studio albums

- 1980: Geislavirkir
- 1981: Í upphafi skyldi endinn skoða

Live albums

- 1994: Utangarðsmenn (compilation)

Compilation albums

- 2000: Fuglinn er floginn (on Bad Taste record label)

=== EPs ===
- 1980: Ha ha ha (Rækjureggae)
- 1981: 45 RPM

== Appearances in compilations ==
- 1981: Flugur
- 1981: Gæðapopp
- 1981: Northern Lights Playhouse
- 1982: Næst á Dagskrá
- 1985: Með Lögum Skal Land Byggja
- 1998: Nælur
- 2006: Rokkskífan
