= Björgvin Halldórsson =

Icelandic pop singer (1951–2026)

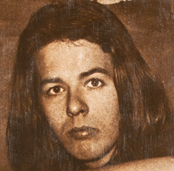

Background information
- Also known as: Bo Halldórsson
- Born: Björgvin Helgi Halldórsson; 16 April 1951; Hafnarfjörður, Iceland
- Died: 9 April 2026 (aged 74)
- Occupation: Singer

Björgvin Helgi Halldórsson (alternate names: Bo Halldórsson, Björgvin Halldórsson or Bo Hall) (16 April 1951 – 9 April 2026) was an Icelandic pop singer from Hafnarfjörður. He represented Iceland in the Eurovision Song Contest 1995 with the song Núna (English: Now), ranked in 15th place with 31 points.

== Life and career ==
Björgvin was born on 16 April 1951. His daughter Svala is a pop singer, and was Iceland's representative in the Eurovision Song Contest 2017. His son Krummi is also a singer.

Halldórsson took part in several bands, amongst them were Ðe lónlí blú bojs, Brimkló, Flowers and Hljómar.

He performed with Sigrún Hjálmtýsdóttir, amongst others, and released several solo albums. Björgvin also took part in several television shows.

Björgvin died on 9 April 2026, one week short of his 75th birthday.

== Discography ==
=== Albums ===
This is a selective list of albums by Björgvin.

- Þó líði ár og öld (1969)
- Ég syng fyrir þig (1978)
- Jólagestir (1987)
- Allir fá þá eitthvað fallegt (1989)
- Jólagestir 2 (1989)
- Yrkjum Ísland (smáskífa) (1994)
- Þó líði ár og öld (1994)
- Núna / If it's gonna end in heartache (1995)
- Núna (1995)
- Jólagestir 3 (1995)
- Alla leið heim (1997)
- Bestu jólalög Björgvins (1999)
- Um jólin (2000)
- Á hverju kvöldi (2000)
- Eftirlýstur (2001)
- Ég tala um þig (2002)
- Brúðarskórnir (2003)
- Duet (2003)
- Manstu það (smáskífa) (2005)
- Ár og öld (2005)
- Björgvin ásamt Sinfóníuhljómsveit Íslands & gestum (2006)
- Björgvin (2006)
- Jólagestir 4 (2007)
- Jólagestir Björgvins í Höllinni 2008 (2008)
- Duet II / Duet II (Deluxe) (2010)
- Gullvagninn (2011)
- Duet 3 (2013) (with Jón Jónsson)
- Ég trúi því (2015)
- Ég kem með jólin til þín (2020)

=== Singles ===
(Selective)

- "Núna" / "If It's Gonna End in Heartache" (1995)
- "Ást er æði" (2013)
- "Kæri vinur" (duet with Jón Jónsson) (2014)

Preceded by Sigga with "Nætur"	Iceland in the Eurovision Song Contest; 1995	Succeeded by Anna Mjöll with "Sjúbídú"
