= Rúnar Júlíusson =

Icelandic singer, music producer and footballer

- Also known as: Rúnni Júl
- Born: Guðmundur Rúnar Júlíusson; 13 April 1945; Keflavík, Iceland
- Died: 5 December 2008 (aged 63) Keflavík, Iceland
- Occupation(s): Singer, producer
- Formerly of: Hljómar; Trúbrot; Lónlí blú bojs; Áhöfnin á Halastjörnunni; Hljómsveit Rúnars Júlíussonar; GCD

Guðmundur Rúnar Júlíusson (13 April 1945 – 5 December 2008), alternate names: Rúnar Júlíusson or Rúni Júl, was an Icelandic pop singer, music producer and footballer from Keflavík.

== Football career ==
Rúnar was a member of Keflavík ÍF's first national championship in 1964. The same year he was selected to the Icelandic national team, playing a friendly, but missed its games against Wales due to a musical tour with his band Hljómar.

== Death ==
Rúnar died on 5 December 2008, after suffering a heart attack when he was about to go on stage during a performance in his hometown Keflavík.
