= Prakash Nagarkatti =

Scientist and academic

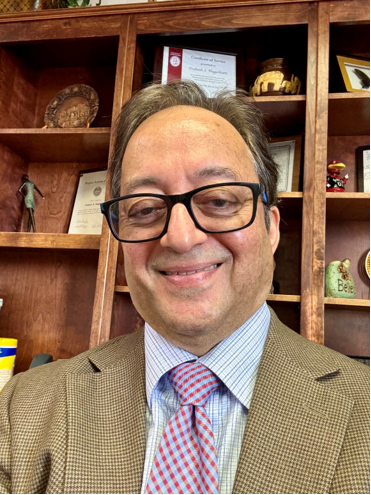
Senior Research Advisor to the President of the University of SC, Vice President for Research Emeritus, and Carolina Distinguished Professor of Pathology, Microbiology & Immunology.

Prakash Nagarkatti is a scientist, an academic, and a university administrator who served as the Vice President for Research at the University of South Carolina (USC) from 2011 to 2021. He serves as Senior Research Advisor to the President at USC and Carolina Distinguished Professor. His expertise is in the fields of immunology and toxicology. His contributions to science have been recognized through numerous awards, including the Vos Lifetime Career Achievement Award (1996) and the Distinguished Toxicology Scholar Award from the Society of Toxicology (SOT) (2022). Nagarkatti was elected as a Fellow of the National Academy of Inventors (2018), a Fellow of the Academy of Toxicological Sciences (2017), and a Fellow of the American Association for the Advancement of Science (2012)

Nagarkatti is actively involved in communicating science to the public through his writings in The Conversation, which has been published by numerous media outlets, including Yahoo News, PBS News Hour, and Scientific American, to name a few. He has also been interviewed at several regional and national radio and TV stations and by several newspapers and online websites. Some examples include The State, KYFF TV, WLTX TV, ABC Columbia, Forbes, Science Daily, PBS News Hour, New Scientist, BBC News, and the like. He also served on the COVID-19 vaccine panel for USA Today. Nagarkatti is a strong proponent of geographic equality in federal research funding and has played a vital role in enhancing NSF EPSCoR and NIH IDeA programs. Through his service on a congressionally mandated advisory group to NSF and as Chair of EPSCoR/IDeA Foundation, he successfully advocated for Congress to reduce geographic diversity in federal research funding.

== Education ==
Nagarkatti received his Ph.D. in immunology from Jiwaji University while pursuing research as a Senior Scientist at the Defense Research Development Establishment, Gwalior, India. He came to McMaster University to pursue his post-doctoral studies under the mentorship of Dr. David Clark in 1981. He then moved to the United States to pursue a second post-doctoral fellowship with Dr. Alan Kaplan at the University of Kentucky. Nagarkatti received his B.S. degree in Botany and M.S. degree in Medical Microbiology from Karnatak University, Dharwad, India.

== Career ==
Nagarkatti is well known for his research on cannabinoids and their effect on cancer and immune cells. In addition, he has made seminal discoveries on how environmental and nutritional factors alter immune functions by regulating epigenetic pathways and microbiome Nagarkatti started his independent academic career as a tenure-track assistant professor at Virginia Tech, His research was funded by the National Institutes of Health (NIH), National Science Foundation (NSF), Environmental Protection Agency (EPA), along with other agencies.

Nagarkatti has provided extensive service regionally and nationally. He has served as a member of numerous NIH Study Sections and Chaired several such NIH review panels. He has served as a Member of the FDA Expert Working Group on Drug-induced vascular injury as well as served on the Scientific Advisory Panel established under section 25(d) of the Federal Insecticide, Fungicide, and Rodenticide Act (FIFRA) by the Environmental Protection Agency.

In 2022, NSF selected Nagarkatti to serve on a National Committee called "Envisioning the Future of NSF," a subcommittee of the congressionally mandated Committee on Equal Opportunities in Science and Engineering. At the Society of Toxicology, he helped establish the Special Interest Groups and construct the bylaws for the American Scientists of Indian Origin (ASIO). In 2021, he was elected to serve as the Chair of the SOT Endowment Board. He has also established an Endowment Fund called "Mitzi and Prakash Nagarkatti Research Excellence in Immunotoxicology Award" to assist graduate students or postdoctoral scholars in attending the SOT Annual Meeting and presenting their research.

== Selected Bibliography ==
- Singh, Narendra P.; Yang, Xiaoming; Bam, Marpe; Nagarkatti, Mitzi; Nagarkatti, Prakash (2023-01-01). "2,3,7,8-Tetrachlorodibenzo-p-dioxin induces multigenerational alterations in the expression of microRNA in the thymus through epigenetic modifications". PNAS Nexus. 2 (1) pgac290. doi:10.1093/pnasnexus/pgac290. ISSN 2752-6542. PMC 9833045. PMID 36712935.
- Busbee, Philip B.; Menzel, Lorenzo; Alrafas, Haider Rasheed; Dopkins, Nicholas; Becker, William; Miranda, Kathryn; Tang, Chaunbing; Chatterjee, Saurabh; Singh, Udai; Nagarkatti, Mitzi; Nagarkatti, Prakash S. (2020-01-16). "Indole-3-carbinol prevents colitis and associated microbial dysbiosis in an IL-22-dependent manner". JCI Insight. 5 (1): e127551, 127551. doi:10.1172/jci.insight.127551. ISSN 2379-3708. PMC 7030851. PMID 31941837.
- Neamah, Wurood Hantoosh; Singh, Narendra P.; Alghetaa, Hasan; Abdulla, Osama A.; Chatterjee, Saurabh; Busbee, Philip B.; Nagarkatti, Mitzi; Nagarkatti, Prakash (2019-10-01). "AhR Activation Leads to Massive Mobilization of Myeloid-Derived Suppressor Cells with Immunosuppressive Activity through Regulation of CXCR2 and MicroRNA miR-150-5p and miR-543-3p That Target Anti-Inflammatory Genes". Journal of Immunology. 203 (7): 1830–1844. doi:10.4049/jimmunol.1900291. ISSN 1550-6606. PMC 6755129. PMID 31492743.
- McKallip, Robert J.; Lombard, Catherine; Fisher, Michael; Martin, Billy R.; Ryu, Seongho; Grant, Steven; Nagarkatti, Prakash S.; Nagarkatti, Mitzi (2002-07-15). "Targeting CB2 cannabinoid receptors as a novel therapy to treat malignant lymphoblastic disease". Blood. 100 (2): 627–634. doi:10.1182/blood-2002-01-0098. ISSN 0006-4971. PMID 12091357. S2CID 2812041.
- Seth, A.; Gote, L.; Nagarkatti, M.; Nagarkatti, P. S. (1991-09-01). "T-cell-receptor-independent activation of cytolytic activity of cytotoxic T lymphocytes mediated through CD44 and gp90MEL-14". Proceedings of the National Academy of Sciences of the United States of America. 88 (17): 7877–7881. Bibcode:1991PNAS...88.7877S. doi:10.1073/pnas.88.17.7877. ISSN 0027-8424. PMC 52407. PMID 1881921.
