= Garden Party (album) =

Studio album by Rick Nelson and The Stone Canyon Band
- Released: November 27, 1972
- Recorded: May 11–October 16, 1972
- Studios: United Western, Hollywood
- Genre: Country rock
- Length: 36:27
- Label: Decca
- Producer: Rick Nelson

Rick Nelson and The Stone Canyon Band chronology
Rudy the Fifth (1971)	Garden Party (1972)	Windfall (1974)

Singles from Garden Party
- 1. "Garden Party" Released: 1972; 2. "Palace Guard" Released: 1973

Garden Party is the twentieth studio album by Rick Nelson, this one a country rock album recorded with the Stone Canyon Band in 1972. The title song tells the story of Nelson being booed at a concert at Madison Square Garden.

The Album features self-penned songs like "Let It Bring You Along", "Nightime Lady", "So Long Mama", and re-recorded versions of Chuck Berry's "I'm Talking About You", which he had previously recorded on Spotlight on Rick 8 years later. Released as a single prior to the album, "Garden Party" peaked at number 6 on the Billboard Hot 100 singles chart, number 8 on the Cashbox singles charts, number 1 on the Adult Contemporary chart in the United States, number 1 also in Canada, and at number 41 in the United Kingdom.

The album debuted on the Billboard Top LPs & Tape chart in the issue dated December 9, 1972, and remained on the chart for 18 weeks, peaking at number 32. It reached No. 45 on the Cashbox albums chart, where it spent for 15 weeks. According to Nelson, ""Garden Party' really took off before I expected it to. When it came out, it was like an old album because it was so long after the single".

The album was released on compact disc in the UK in 1997 (NTMCD540) and in the U.S. 2 years later (MCAD-31364). Beat Goes On released a 2-albums-on-one CD version on March 13, 2002, including Nelson's Final Decca/MCA album from January 1974, Windfall. Bear Family included also the album in the 2010 The Last Time Around box set.

== Reception ==
Professional ratings
Review scores
Source	Rating
AllMusic	3.5/5 stars
Christgau's Record Guide	B−
Rolling Stone	(favorable)
The Encyclopedia of Popular Music	4/5 stars

Bruce Eder of AllMusic said that the album "playing is more subdued and lyrical on Nelson's own "Night Time Lady," and the bluesy "Flower Opens Gently By," and the album ends on the soft, bittersweet ballad "Palace Guard." There's a fair amount of melodic invention throughout, though not quite enough to make this album a classic."

Billboard described the album as "a fine LP."

Cashbox gave a positive review, saying that "it ranges from Dylan-type love song to goodtime stompin'.

Rolling Stone described the album as "an interesting album" and noted "I Wanna Be with You", "Don't Let Your Goodbye Stand", and "Let It Bring You Along" are hardish rockers".

== Track listing ==
=== Side one ===
All tracks are written by Rick Nelson, except where noted.

No.	Title	Writer(s)	Length
1.	"Let It Bring You Along"	Stephen A. Love	4:12
2.	"Garden Party"		3:50
3.	"So Long Mama"		3:25
4.	"I Wanna Be With You"	Randy Meisner, Allen Kemp	2:15
5.	"Are You Really Real?"		3:25

=== Side two ===
No.	Title	Writer(s)	Length
1.	"I'm Talking About You""	Chuck Berry	3:55
2.	"Night Time Lady"		3:50
3.	"A Flower Opens Gently By"		3:08
4.	"Don't Let Your Goodbye Stand"	Richard Stekol	3:17
5.	"Palace Guard"		5:10

== Charts ==
Chart (1972–1973)	Peak position
US Top LPs (Billboard)	32
US Cashbox	45
Australia (Kent Music Report)	67

== Personnel ==
- Rick Nelson – guitar, lead vocals
- Allen Kemp – lead guitar, background vocals
- Tom Brumley – steel guitar
- Stephen A. Love – bass, background vocals
- Patrick Shanahan – drums
- Don Nelson – wood flute

== Production ==
- Producer: Rick Nelson
- Recording engineer: Michael "Nemo" Shields
- Photography: Martin S. Martin
- Artistic design: Kristen Nelson
