= Trúbrot =

Icelandic rock band

Trúbrot were an Icelandic psychedelic/progressive rock band active in the late 1960s and early 1970s.

== History ==
The band was formed in 1969 as an Icelandic supergroup composed of members of the bands Hljómar and Flowers. Their eponymous first album was released that same year, a collection of orchestral and organ-backed pop songs which included covers of The Beatles's "Things We Said Today", The Supremes's "My World Is Empty Without You" and Jose Feliciano's "Rain", as well as a five-minute mini-opera "Elskaðu Náungann", which was based on Richard Wagner's Tannhäuser.

While the first album is entirely in Icelandic, later albums featured more English singing, which was at the time controversial in Iceland. 1971's Lifun came in an octagonal cover.

Several members of this band would become part of the group Náttúra, who released one album in 1972. Trúbrot itself broke up in 1973.

== Members ==
- Shady Owens - vocals
- Gunnar Þórðarson - guitar, flute, vocals
- Karl Sighvatsson - organ, piano
- Rúnar Júlíusson - vocals, bass
- Gunnar Jökull Hákonarson - drums, vocals
- Magnús Kjartansson - piano, organ, vocals
- Ólafur Garðarsson - drums

== Discography ==
- Trúbrot (Fálkinn/EMI, 1969; Reissued on CD, Steinar, 1992; Reissued on LP + CD, Shadoks Music, 2010)
- Undir Áhrifum (Fálkinn/Parlophone, 1970; Reissued on CD, Steinar, 1992; Reissued on LP + CD, Shadoks Music, 2010)
- Lifun (Tónaútgáfan, 1971; Reissued on CD, Geimsteinn, 1991; Reissued on LP + CD, Shadoks Music, 2011)
- Mandala (Private Press, 1972; Reissued on CD, Geimsteinn, 1996; Reissued on LP + CD, Shadoks Music, 2011)
