= Flámæli =

Icelandic sound change

Flámæli (Icelandic pronunciation: [ˈflauːmailɪ]; lit. 'slanted speech'), also known as flámælgi and flámælska, was an Icelandic-language sound change which was widespread in the first half of the 20th century in Iceland, especially in the West and the South. The vowels /ɪ/ and /ʏ/ (written ⟨i⟩ or ⟨y⟩ and ⟨u⟩ respectively) were lowered so that vinur (/ˈvɪːnʏr/, transl. 'friend') was pronounced /ˈvɛːnʏr/ (as if written ⟨venur⟩) and skyr (/scɪːr/, a kind of yogurt) as /scɛːr/ (like ⟨sker⟩), while the vowels e and ö were raised such that spölur (/spœːlʏr/, transl. 'short distance') sounded like /spʏːlʏr/ (as if ⟨spulur⟩) and melur (/ˈmɛːlʏr/, transl. 'gravel patch') as /ˈmɪːlʏr/ (as if ⟨milur⟩).

This sound change was thought to be very ugly and called hljóðvilla (transl. 'sound error'). It was prominent from 1940 in the speech of people from the Southwest and the Eastfjords, but also in the North and in Húnavatnssýsla. A special campaign was carried out during 1940–1960 in primary schools to eliminate flámæli. RÚV and Þjóðleikhúsið enforced a policy that the so-called phonological error would not be allowed. In 1929, 42% of children in Reykjavík spoke with flámæli, but by 1960 it had been eradicated among children.

It has been suggested that Flámæli has, to a larger or lesser extent, been preserved among immigrant communities of Icelanders in North America.

== See also ==
- Dialect
- Linguistic purism
- Sound change
