= Garden Party (Rick Nelson song) =

Single by Rick Nelson and The Stone Canyon Band

from the album Garden Party
- B-side: "So Long Mama"
- Released: July 1972
- Genre: Country rock
- Length: 3:50
- Label: Decca
- Songwriter: Rick Nelson
- Producer: Rick Nelson

Rick Nelson and The Stone Canyon Band singles chronology
"Gypsy Pilot" (1972)	"Garden Party" (1972)	"Palace Guard" (1973)

"Garden Party" is a 1972 song written by Rick Nelson and recorded by him and the Stone Canyon Band for the album Garden Party. The song tells the story of Nelson being booed at a concert at Madison Square Garden. It was Nelson's last top 40 hit, reaching No. 6 on the U.S. Billboard pop chart.

== The concert ==
On October 15, 1971, Richard Nader's Rock 'n Roll Spectacular Volume VII concert was held at Madison Square Garden in New York City. The playbill included many notable performers of the early rock era, including Chuck Berry, Bo Diddley, and Bobby Rydell, with Rick Nelson and the Stone Canyon Band listed as a "special added attraction".

Nelson came on stage dressed in the then-current fashion, wearing bell-bottoms and a purple velvet shirt, with his hair hanging down to his shoulders. He started playing his older songs like "Hello Mary Lou", but then he played the Rolling Stones' "Country Honk" (a country version of their hit song "Honky Tonk Women") and the crowd began to boo. While some reports say that the booing was caused by police action in the back of the audience, Nelson thought it was directed at him. Nevertheless, he sang another song but then left the building and did not appear onstage for the finale.

== The song ==
"Garden Party" tells of various people who were present, frequently in an oblique manner ("Yoko brought her Walrus", referring to Yoko Ono and John Lennon), with a chorus:

But it's all right now, I've learned my lesson well
You see, you can't please everyone, so you've got to please yourself

One more reference in the lyrics pertains to a particularly mysterious and legendary audience member: "Mr. Hughes hid in Dylan's shoes, wearing his disguise". The Mr. Hughes in question was ex-Beatle George Harrison, who was a next-door neighbor and good friend of Nelson. Harrison used "Hughes" as his traveling alias.

=== Lyric references ===
- A garden party: October 15, 1971's Rock 'n Roll Spectacular at Madison Square Garden, New York City
- My old friends: Fellow performers at the concert Chuck Berry, Bo Diddley and Bobby Rydell
- People came from miles around: Bo Diddley, "Story of Bo Diddley"
- Yoko: Yoko Ono
- Yoko's walrus: John Lennon (Lennon's song "I Am the Walrus")
- Mr. Hughes: George Harrison
- (Mr. Hughes) hid in Dylan's shoes: Harrison often used "Mr. Hughes" as an alias while traveling.
- I said hello to Mary Lou, She belongs to me: Nelson's song "Hello Mary Lou", which he played at the concert; also a reference to "She Belongs to Me", a Bob Dylan song covered by Nelson
- I sang a song about a Honky-Tonk: The Rolling Stones song "Country Honk", the song that allegedly caused the booing
- It was time to leave: Nelson's subsequent departure
- Out stepped Johnny B. Goode: Chuck Berry's song "Johnny B. Goode"
- Playing guitar like a-ringing a bell: From "Johnny B. Goode", "He could play guitar just like a-ringing a bell"
- I'd rather drive a truck: Elvis Presley worked for a time as a truck driver, having famously been told after several failed singing auditions to "stick to truck driving because you're never going to make it as a singer."

== Charts ==
"Garden Party" reached number six on the Billboard Hot 100 chart in the fall of 1972; it was Nelson's last top 40 hit on the US pop chart. The song topped the Billboard Easy Listening chart for two weeks and reached number 44 on the Billboard Country Singles chart. The song peaked at number six in both Australia and South Africa and reached number one in Canada.

== Chart history ==
=== Weekly charts ===
Chart (1972)	Peak position
Australia	6
Canada RPM Adult Contemporary	13
Canada RPM Top Singles	1
South Africa (Springbok)	6
UK Singles Chart	41
US Billboard Hot 100	6
US Billboard Easy Listening	1
US Billboard Hot Country Singles	44
US Cash Box Top 100	3

=== Year-end charts ===
Chart (1972)	Rank
Australia	44
Canada	44
US Billboard Hot 100	46
US Billboard Top Easy Listening Singles	8

== Covers ==
Ricky Nelson re-recorded "Garden Party" with the Jordanaires and studio musicians for his 1985 album All My Best.

Country singer Johnny Lee recorded a cover version of the song in the late 1970s, entitled "Country Party", with slightly altered lyrics. Dwight Yoakam has also performed it live in concert. In 2000 Tarsha Vega sampled "Garden Party" in her song "Be Ya Self" for the soundtrack for The Adventures of Rocky and Bullwinkle.

The UK band Smokie recorded a cover of the song.

In 2009, John Fogerty recorded the song with the Eagles' Don Henley and Timothy B. Schmit, for his The Blue Ridge Rangers Rides Again album.

In 2012, Adam Young of Owl City covered the song and released it to his SoundCloud and personal blog followers. The song was pulled off of SoundCloud in late 2015, but can still be found on YouTube.

On December 31, 2012, Phish opened their New Year's Eve concert with the song at Madison Square Garden. Phish bassist and singer Mike Gordon, who sang lead on the tune, wore a shirt very reminiscent of the one George Harrison wore on the cover of Sgt. Pepper's Lonely Hearts Club Band.

Gary Pig Gold recorded his own personal take on the song, which reflected an encounter with Rick himself and appeared, in 2013, on Pop Garden Radio's Legacy: A Tribute to Rick Nelson Volume 1 CD.

Tesla guitarist Frank Hannon covered the song, assisted by Matthew and Gunnar Nelson, on his 2018 solo album From One Place to Another Vol. 1.

Reggae song "Bad Reputation" by The Chantels is a partial cover of "Garden Party" by Rick Nelson. Released in 1978 by Producer Roy Francis under Phase One records in Jamaica, the song uses the same music but mostly different lyrics except for the "But it's all right now, I've learned my lesson well" portion of the chorus.

On May 15, 2025, Bob Dylan covered the song at a show in San Diego, California.

== Filmography ==
- McCloud (1972) In the first episode of the third season, "The New Mexican Connection", Rick Nelson sings "Garden Party" in a concert sequence.
- The Hardy Boys/Nancy Drew Mysteries (1977), the song is featured in season 1, episode 7, "The Flickering Torch Mystery,"
- Saturday Night Live (2008) Featured in a "Road Trip" skit with guest host Paul Rudd.

== See also ==
- List of Billboard Easy Listening number ones of 1972
