= Keflavík =

- Town
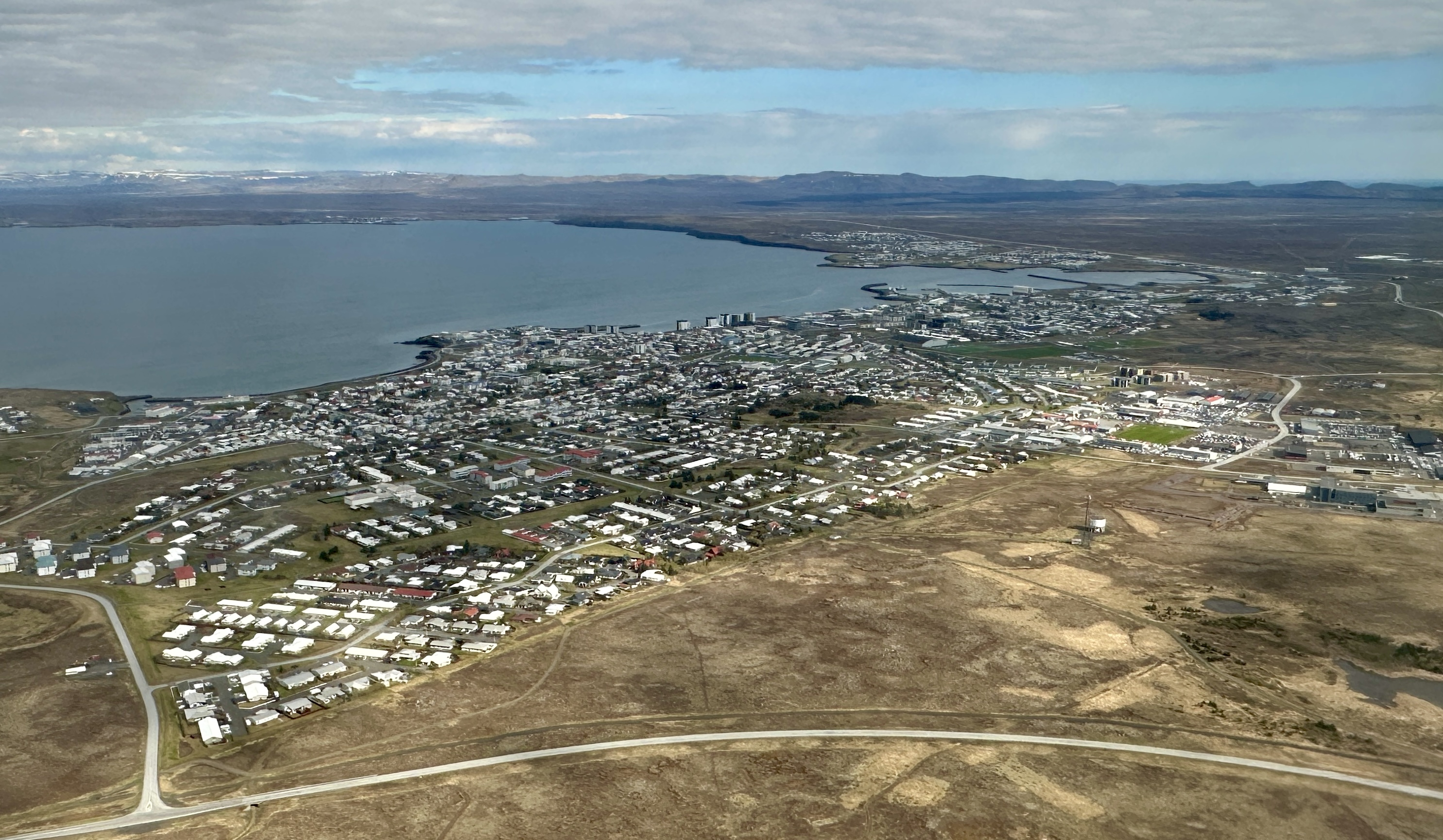
- 2026 aerial view

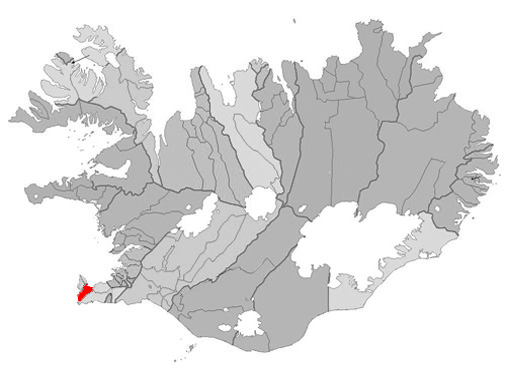
- Location of the Municipality of Reykjanesbaer

- Location in Iceland
- Coordinates: 64°01′N 22°34′W
- Country: Iceland
- Constituency: South Constituency
- Region: Southern Peninsula
- Municipality: Reykjanesbær

Population (2018)
  - Total: 15,930^{[a]}
- Time zone: UTC+0 (GMT)
- Website: Official website
- When combined with Njarðvík.

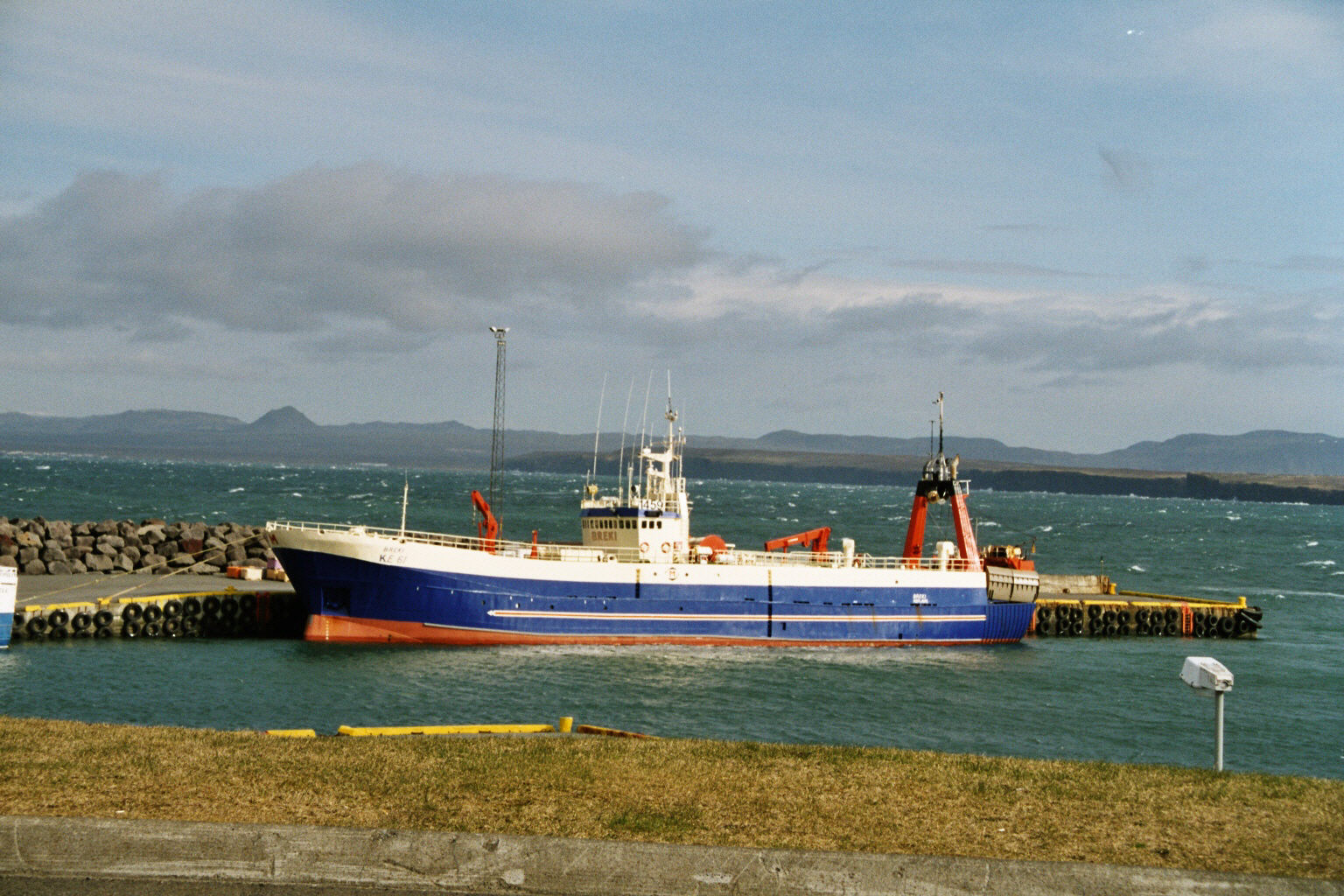
The harbour at Keflavík

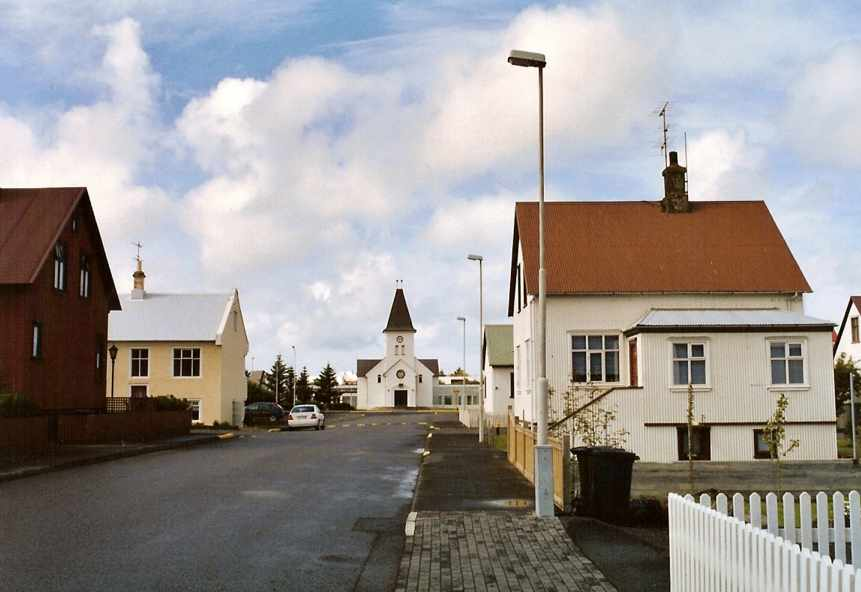
Church at Norðfjörðsgata

Keflavík (pronounced [ˈcʰɛplaˌviːk], meaning Driftwood Bay) is a town in the Reykjanes region in southwest Iceland. It is included in the municipality of Reykjanesbær whose population as of 2016 is 15,129.

In 1995, Keflavík merged with nearby Njarðvík and Hafnir to form the municipality of Reykjanesbær. Keflavík International Airport, the country's largest airport (serving nearby Reykjavík) is adjacent to the town.

== History ==
Keflavík was founded by Scottish entrepreneurs and engineers in the 16th century, and developed on account of its fishing and fish processing industry.

In the 1940s an airport was built next to the town by the United States military, which served as an important refueling stop for trans-Atlantic flights, especially during World War II.

During the Cold War, Naval Air Station Keflavik played an important role in monitoring marine and submarine traffic from the Norwegian and Greenland seas into the Atlantic Ocean. Forces from the United States Air Force were added to provide radar monitoring, fighter intercept, in-flight refueling, and aerial/marine rescue. With increasing ranges for aircraft and the dissolution of the Soviet Union, the base became less important, and the last U.S. personnel were withdrawn in 2006.

Within Iceland, Keflavík was renowned as a rich source of musicians during the 1960s and 1970s, and came to be known as bítlabærinn [ˈpihtlaˌpaiːrɪn] or "The Beatle Town".

In August 2025, Crusoe and atNorth announced a 24 MW expansion of Crusoe Cloud capacity at the ICE02 data center in Keflavík, increasing the capacity covered by their partnership from 33 MW to 57 MW. The expansion included the deployment of NVIDIA GB200 NVL72 infrastructure and Blackwell GPUs.

== Geography and climate ==
The local geography is dominated by fields of basalt rubble, interspersed with a few hardy plants and mosses.

The climate of Keflavík is subpolar oceanic (Köppen: Cfc) with cool summers and moderately cold winters. There is not a truly dry month but June is the month that gets the least precipitation. Winter high temperatures average above the freezing mark, and summer high temperatures are cool to mild. The warmest month on average is July with an average high of 14.2 °C (58 °F) and the coldest is January with an average high of 3.4 °C (38 °F).

Climate data for Keflavík Airport, 1991–2020 normals, extremes 1952–present
Month	Jan	Feb	Mar	Apr	May	Jun	Jul	Aug	Sep	Oct	Nov	Dec	Year
Record high °C (°F)	10.3 (50.5)	11.5 (52.7)	12.3 (54.1)	15.0 (59.0)	19.5 (67.1)	19.9 (67.8)	23.0 (73.4)	25.0 (77.0)	17.8 (64.0)	14.5 (58.1)	13.5 (56.3)	12.4 (54.3)	25.0 (77.0)
Mean daily maximum °C (°F)	3.4 (38.1)	3.4 (38.1)	4.2 (39.6)	6.7 (44.1)	9.5 (49.1)	12.6 (54.7)	14.2 (57.6)	13.6 (56.5)	11.1 (52.0)	7.6 (45.7)	5.0 (41.0)	3.7 (38.7)	7.9 (46.2)
Daily mean °C (°F)	1.0 (33.8)	0.8 (33.4)	1.3 (34.3)	3.6 (38.5)	6.5 (43.7)	9.5 (49.1)	11.2 (52.2)	10.8 (51.4)	8.4 (47.1)	5.0 (41.0)	2.5 (36.5)	1.1 (34.0)	5.1 (41.2)
Mean daily minimum °C (°F)	−1.4 (29.5)	−1.6 (29.1)	−1.0 (30.2)	1.2 (34.2)	4.1 (39.4)	7.2 (45.0)	9.0 (48.2)	8.8 (47.8)	6.5 (43.7)	3.1 (37.6)	0.4 (32.7)	−1.1 (30.0)	2.9 (37.2)
Record low °C (°F)	−17.5 (0.5)	−17.0 (1.4)	−15.4 (4.3)	−15.2 (4.6)	−6.3 (20.7)	−0.3 (31.5)	2.8 (37.0)	0.4 (32.7)	−3.3 (26.1)	−9.2 (15.4)	−12.2 (10.0)	−13.8 (7.2)	−17.5 (0.5)
Average precipitation mm (inches)	106.1 (4.18)	105.3 (4.15)	96.2 (3.79)	73.6 (2.90)	67.4 (2.65)	53.0 (2.09)	65.5 (2.58)	87.7 (3.45)	120.7 (4.75)	111.2 (4.38)	104.6 (4.12)	113.0 (4.45)	1,104.3 (43.48)
Average precipitation days (≥ 1.0 mm)	16.9	16.0	15.7	12.3	12.0	10.0	10.9	12.8	15.8	15.1	14.8	16.7	169.0
Average snowy days (≥ 0 cm)	9.0	8.8	6.8	0.8	0.0	0.0	0.0	0.0	0.0	0.6	2.8	8.2	37.0
Average dew point °C (°F)	−2.1 (28.2)	−2.5 (27.5)	−2.2 (28.0)	−0.3 (31.5)	2.4 (36.3)	5.7 (42.3)	8.0 (46.4)	7.9 (46.2)	5.5 (41.9)	1.9 (35.4)	−0.6 (30.9)	−2.0 (28.4)	1.8 (35.2)
Source 1: NOAA
Source 2: Iceland Met Office (extremes)

== Sport ==
The town is represented in sports by Íþrótta- og ungmennafélag Keflavíkur.

== In popular culture ==
The former NATO military base Naval Air Station Keflavik is used as a setting for an important story line in Tom Clancy's novel Red Storm Rising.

NAS Keflavik is also a central setting in Icelandic writer Arnaldur Indriðason's 1999 mystery Napóleonsskjölin, translated into English in 2011 as Operation Napoleon.

The compilation album for local beat band Thor's Hammer is titled From Keflavík, With Love, and was released in 2001 on Big Beat Records.

== Notable people ==
- Birgir Þórarinsson (born 1965), politician and Member of the Althing
- Birna Arnbjörnsdóttir (born 1952), linguist
- Helgi Skúlason (1933-1996), actor and stage director
- Jón Kalman Stefánsson (born 1963), author
- Julius Fridriksson (living), Icelandic-American academic and scientist
- Rán Ísold Eysteinsdóttir (born 1995), actress and model
- Svanfríður Jónasdóttir (born 1951), politician and teacher
- Sveindís Jane Jónsdóttir (born 2001), footballer for Angel City FC (National Women's Soccer League) and the Iceland national team

== See also ==
- Cold War
- Iceland Defense Force, headquartered in Keflavík until 2006
- Uppspretta
