= Hafdís Ingvarsdóttir =

Icelandic academic

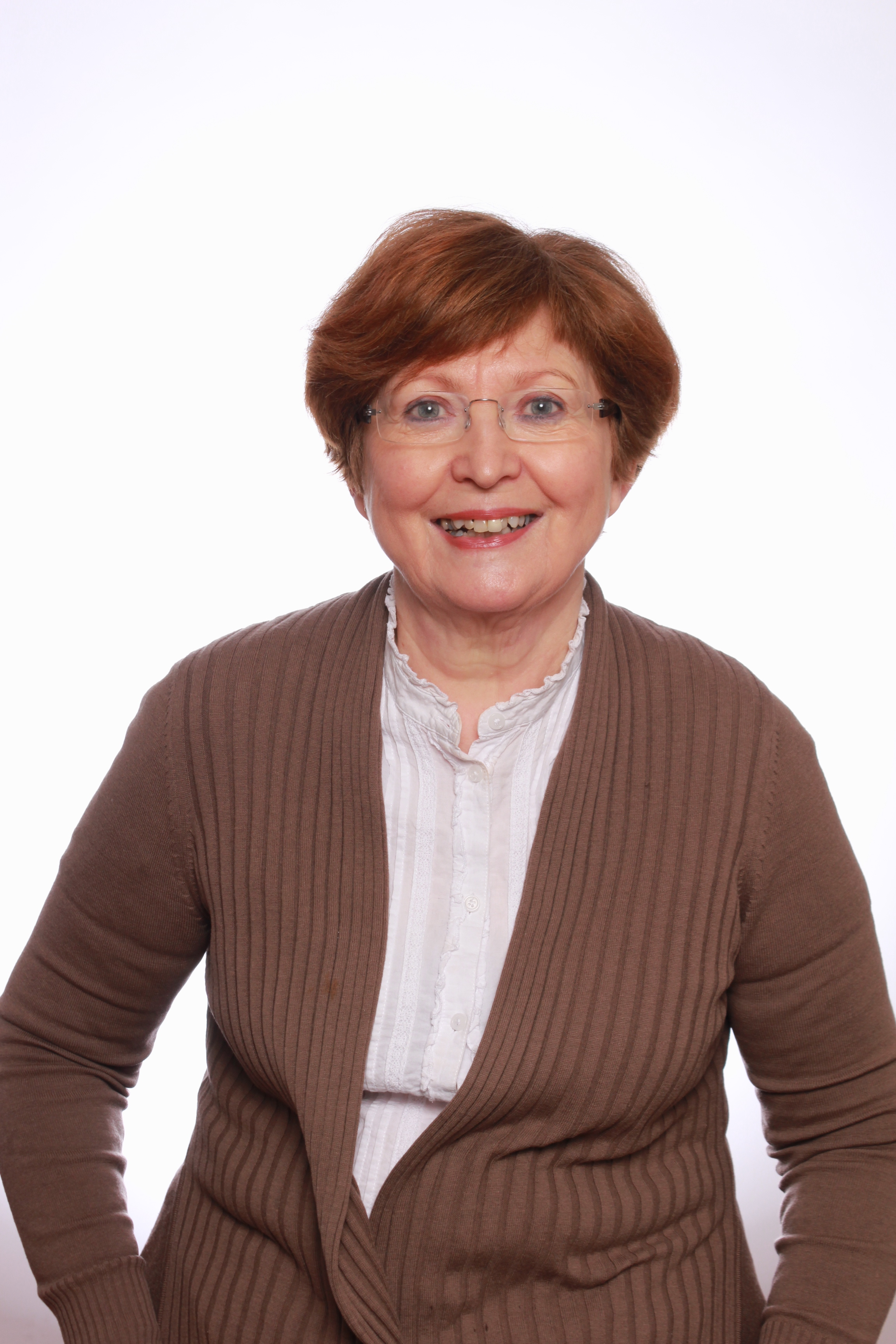
- Occupation: professor emerita in education at the University of Iceland

Hafdís Ingvarsdóttir is a professor emeritus in education at the University of Iceland.

== Professional experience ==
Hafdís Ingvarsdóttir completed her matriculation examination from Menntaskólinn í Reykjavík (Junior College in Reykjavik) (1964), and obtained her teaching certificate at Iceland University of Education (1965). She holds a BA in Danish and History from the University of Iceland (1968). In addition to her BA studies, she taught at Hagaskóli in Reykjavik. She later pursued graduate studies in Danish and literature at the University of Copenhagen (1969–1971). After completing her studies, she returned to teaching at Hagaskóli where she taught until 1981. She also taught at the Commercial College of Iceland, holding a full-time position there until 1988. She then began working at the University of Iceland, initially as adjunct teacher and teaching director. In 1997, she was appointed as an assistant professor. She holds a master's degree in Education from the University of Reading, England with emphasis on language learning and teaching (applied linguistics) (1993). She completed a doctorate in Education from the same university (2003). Hafdís was appointed as a professor in education in 2009 at the University of Iceland.

== Research ==
Hafdís has engaged in numerous research projects related to teaching and education. In her research she has focused on teaching methods and teacher development with the aim of strengthening teacher growth. Her research can be divided into three overlapping fields: research into teachers’ professional theories, research on teaching and research on teacher education. Her PhD dissertation reports a research into teachers’ professional theories and how those influence their teaching: “The heart of the matter: the nature, use, and formation of teachers' subjective theories in secondary schools in Iceland.” In order to strengthen teachers as professionals and, to develop approaches for that purpose. Hafdís has worked with and developed the concept of teachers’ subjective theories and their connection to their teaching. She has also defined and worked with the concept of allies as an important construct to strengthen teachers' collaboration and cooperation. Hafdís has also researched the status of English and the teaching of English in Iceland in compulsory and upper secondary schools and universities. In the last decade, she has been engaged in longitudinal research (in collaboration with Professor Birna Arnbjörnsdóttir) on the status of English in Iceland.

Hafdís has taken part in many European development projects related to teaching, in addition to research projects on teacher education. She has worked enthusiastically on teachers' continuous education and has held many courses and workshops for that purpose. She has given lectures on her research at a great number of international conferences. Her writings have appeared in both Iceland and other countries in book chapters and peer-reviewed articles.

== Other work and projects ==
Hafdís has held various positions of confidentiality in Iceland and abroad, under the auspices of the Ministry of Education, Science and Culture and the University of Iceland. She was on a collaborative committee on continuous education of upper secondary school teachers, where she represented the University of Iceland (1992–2009). The committee's function was to formulate policy on the continuing education of upper secondary school teachers and allocate funds to upper secondary schools for continuing education. Hafdís sat on a committee on European Teachers’ Education 2010 after the Ministry of Education, Science and Culture nominated her for the period 2006 to 2008. The University of Iceland nominated Hafdís to sit on a committee, under the auspices of the Minister of Education, Science and Culture. The committee's function was to set out proposals on the future organisation of the curriculum for teachers 2005–2006. She was UI's representative on a national committee advising the Minister of Education, Science and Culture. The question was whether to introduce the use of the European portfolio in language teaching (ETM) in Icelandic schools from 2002 to 2006. From 2003 to 2009, she sat on the executive committee of the International Study Association of Teachers and Teaching (ISATT). This is an international association of researchers studying teachers and teaching. In addition, Hafdís sat on an advisory committee, The UK Council for Graduate Education, from 2006 to 2010. She was also one of the founders and the first chairman of the Language Teachers Association in Iceland (STÍL) from 1985 to 1989.

== Acknowledgements ==
In 2016, Hafdís received an award from the international language teachers’ association “Fédération Internationale des Professeurs de Langues Vivantes” (FIPLV) for her contribution to language teaching and research.

== Selected writings ==
=== Articles ===
- Hafdís Ingvarsdóttir (2006). „…eins og þver geit í girðingu“ Viðhorf kennara til breytinga á kennsluháttum. In Úlfar Hauksson (Ritstj.), Rannsóknir í félagsvísindum VII (pp. 351–364). Reykjavík: Háskólaútgáfan.
- Hafdís Ingvarsdóttir (2013). ELF and academic writing: a perspective from the Expanding Circle. Journal of English as a Lingua Franca. JELF. De Gruyter.
- Hafdís Ingvarsdóttir (2018). Kennsluhættir speglaðir í ljósi sjálfræðis: Virðing, ábyrgð og traust. Netla – Veftímarit um uppeldi og menntun. Sérrit 2018 – Framhaldskólinn í brennidepli. Menntavísindasvið Háskóla Íslands, pp. 1–14.

=== Books ===
- Birna Arnbjörnsdóttir og Hafdís Ingvarsdóttir (ritstj.) (2007). Teaching and learning English in Iceland. In honour of Auður Torfadóttir. Reykjavík: Stofnun Vigdísar Finnbogadóttur/Háskólaútgáfan
- Birna Arnbjörnsdóttir og Hafdís Ingvarsdóttir (eds.). (2017). Language Development across the Life Span: The Impact of English on Education and Work in Iceland.
