= Steinar =

Icelandic singer

- Born: Steinar Baldursson; 1995 (age 29–30); Grafarvogur
- Genres: Pop, R&B
- Occupations: Singer, songwriter, producer
- Instruments: Vocals, guitar, drums
- Years active: 2013 – present
- Labels: Unsigned

Steinar Baldursson, known by the mononym Steinar (born 1995) is a singer and songwriter.

Steinar was born in Grafarvogur, a district of Reykjavík. He released his debut album Beginning in Iceland on 15 November 2013 containing 9 tracks in English all written by Steinar himself. He collaborated with Stefán Örn Gunnlaugsson, Kristinn Snær Agnarsson, and Redd Lights. He described the making of the album as tiring as it took much longer than it should have. After writing the album he wasn't sure that he wanted to release the album in Iceland. When Sena, Iceland's largest record label, encouraged him to do so he decided to go for it and released the hit song "Up" as the first single off the album. Up was a tremendous success and stayed at the top of the Icelandic singles chart for 6 consecutive weeks. Later that same year he released the second single "You Know" which he describes as his favorite song off the album and in March 2014 he released Attention, the third single off "Beginning".

== On popular culture ==
In early 2014 Steinar signed an endorsement deal with Nike in Iceland.

== Discography ==
=== Albums ===
- 2013: Beginning
- 2016: (unreleased album)

=== Singles ===
- 2013: "Up"
- 2013: "You Know"
- 2014: "Attention"
- 2014: "Lie To Me"
- 2014: "Do It All Again"
- 2015: "Rhoads"
- 2015: "Don't Know"
- 2016: "Say You Love"
- 2016: "All The Same"
- 2016: "YOUNG"
- 2020: "Numb"
