= Friðrik Karlsson =

Icelandic musician and songwriter

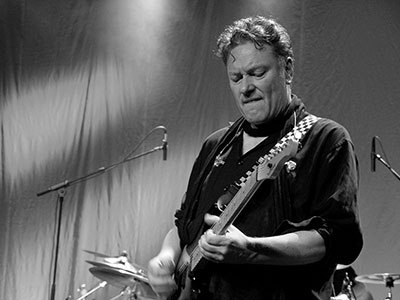
Friðrik Karlsson

Friðrik Karlsson is an Icelandic musician and songwriter. He studied classical and jazz/rock guitar and had success with the group Mezzoforte in 1983 with the U.K. top 20 hit, "Garden Party". He has contributed to the soundtracks of musicals such as Jesus Christ Superstar and Saturday Night Fever and to that of movies such as Evita and Hercules. His TV work includes accompanying singers Madonna, José Carreras and Tom Jones. Karlsson has also appeared on albums and singles from Boyzone and Cliff Richard, among others. Friðrik has moved back home to his native Iceland, after living in London, where he among other jobs worked as a session musician playing guitar in the musical Jesus Christ Superstar. He has released numerous new-age and relaxation music albums known as "The Feel Good Collection". In 2014, Karlsson also played as session musician for Kate Bush's first live performances in 35 years, playing guitar for 22 dates.

== Albums ==
Year	Album
1990	Point blank
1997	River of life
1998	Into the light
1999	Hugar-ró
2000	Máttur hugans
October 30, 2000	New Day
2001	Morgunn / Kvöld
2002	Feng shui
2003	Fullkomin kyrrð
2004	Vellíðan
2005	Töfrandi andrúmsloft
2006	Móðir og barn
2007	Sæld
14 February 2007	The Feel Good Collection : Good Morning
14 February 2007	The Feel Good Collection : Good Night
14 February 2007	The Feel Good Collection : Harmonious Living
14 February 2007	The Feel Good Collection : Magical Atmosphere
14 February 2007	The Feel Good Collection : Magical Healing
14 February 2007	The Feel Good Collection : Magical Treatments
14 February 2007	The Feel Good Collection : Peace of Mind
14 February 2007	The Feel Good Collection : Total Tranquility
14 February 2007	The Feel Good Collection : Total Wellbeing
9 March 2007	The Feel Good Collection : Magical Crystals
9 March 2007	The Feel Good Collection : Total Chillout
9 March 2007	The Feel Good Collection : Total Balance
14 January 2008	The Feel Good Collection : Celtic Sunset
24 June 2008	The Feel Good Collection : Magical Relaxation
24 June 2008	The Feel Good Collection : Spiritual Fitness
29 July 2008	The Feel Good Collection : Chillout Heaven
29 July 2008	The Feel Good Collection : Magical Spa
2009	Töfrandi jól
2010	Rólegt og rómantískt
2010	Slökun og vellíðan
2011	Jóga
2012	Snerting
