= Sena (company) =

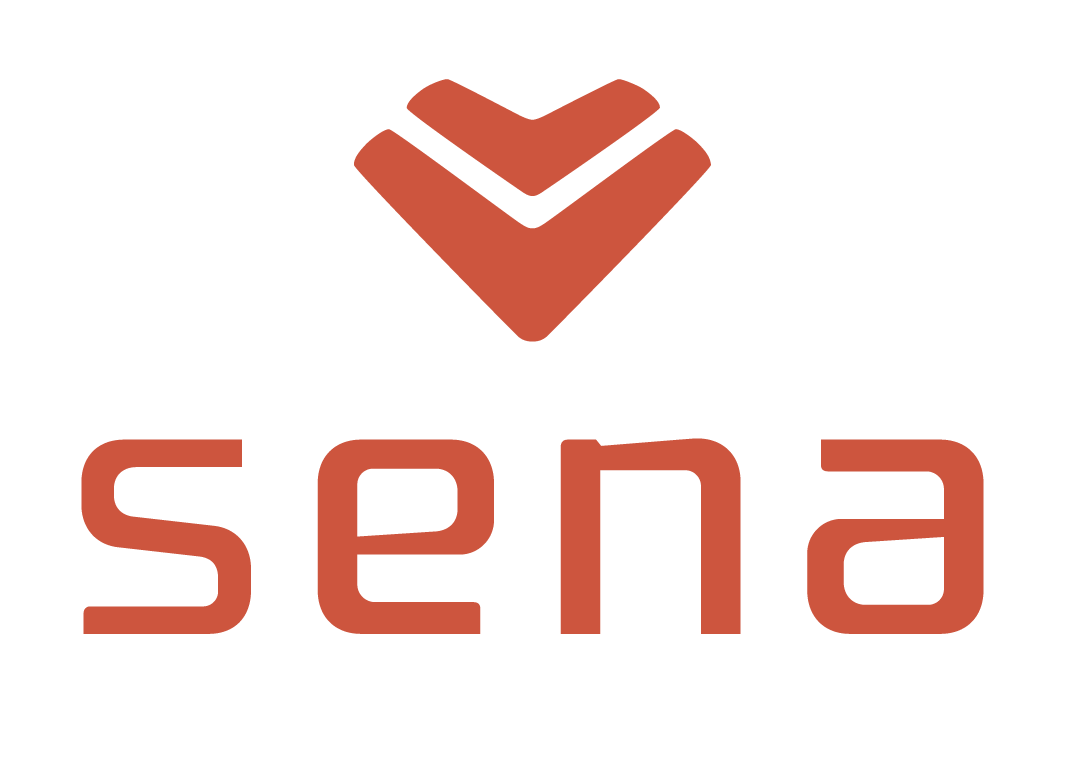
- Founded: 2005
- Genre: Various
- Country of origin: Iceland
- Location: Reykjavík
- Official website: www.sena.is

Sena is an Icelandic company that specializes in event planning and promotion, movie distribution, entertainment and corporate events. It was founded in 2005 following Skífan's rebranding as Dagur Group as its distribution division.

Sena also runs the Smárabíó (located at Smáralind shopping mall in Kópavogur), Háskólabíó and Borgarbíó Akureyri movie theaters.
