= The Rock and Roll Trio =

American rockabilly group

- Also known as: Johnny Burnette and the Rock and Roll Trio
- Origin: Memphis, Tennessee
- Genres: Rockabilly
- Years active: 1951–1957
- Label: Coral
- Past members: Johnny Burnette; Dorsey Burnette; Paul Burlison

The Rock and Roll Trio were an American rockabilly group formed in Memphis, Tennessee, during the 1950s. They were also known as "Johnny Burnette and the Rock and Roll Trio" and the "Johnny Burnette Trio". The members of the Trio were Dorsey Burnette, his younger brother Johnny, and a friend Paul Burlison. Dorsey and Johnny Burnette were both natives of Memphis, having been born there in 1932 and 1934 respectively. Paul Burlison was born in Brownsville, Tennessee, in 1929, but moved to Memphis with his family in 1937.

== Formation ==
The Burnette brothers were keen amateur boxers and became Golden Gloves champions. In 1949, Dorsey met Paul Burlison, also a Golden Gloves champion, at an amateur boxing tournament in Memphis. The two became firm friends, and through this friendship Burlison would also meet Johnny Burnette. All three had an interest in music, and in 1951 they began playing together at the hillbilly nightspots on the outskirts of Memphis, both as a trio and as a part of other groups. In these early days, they played a mixture of country and bluegrass, not untainted with cottonpatch blues. In the honkytonks in and around Memphis the Trio would often play an upbeat country and blues so that the patrons had music to do the 1940-1950s bop and jitterbug, popular at the time, and the sound later called rockabilly, which they perfected in their 1956 Coral Records album.

Johnny and Dorsey Burnette were reported to be early performers on the 'Saturday Night Jamboree', which was a local stage show held every Saturday night at the Goodwyn Institute Auditorium in downtown Memphis in 1953-54. The show was founded by Joe Manuel, who had been a popular hillbilly radio star of the 1930s and 1940s. In 1952 or 1953, they formed a group with Burlison playing lead guitar, Dorsey playing stand-up bass and Johnny playing rhythm guitar and taking the vocal lead. Occasionally they were joined by steel guitarist Albert Vescovo and fiddler Tommy Seeley. With this line-up and at this time, the group may have been known as the Rhythm Rangers.

A contemporary poster from the Von Theater in Booneville, Mississippi, which advertised The Dixieland Jamboree, puts, as the top of the bill, Johnny Burnett & his Rhythm Rangers and describes him as a VON recording artist from Memphis, Tennessee. Second on this bill is Hayden Thomson and his Southern Melody Boys, who are described as Just Back from WSM Nashville, Tennessee. and Ernest Tubb Jamboree.

== Early ==
The trio together with Tommy Seeley and Albert Vescovo had their first recording session with the Von Theater in Boonville, which booked the Burnettes and other talent from out of town. Hayden Thompson, who also recorded for VON, has asserted that the label was unconnected with the theatre. Music writer Adam Komorowski, however, states that the label owner Sam Thomas had named the label after the theatre. The session was arranged and paid for by Eddie Bond's father, Bill Bond, who wanted to manage the band. The Record Exchanger No. 26, however, noted that the session was set up and A & R'd by Buddy Bain, a disc-jockey and performer in Corinth, Mississippi. Their first single was "You're Undecided"(any early indication of their rockabilly style) backed with "Go Mule Go" (Von 1006), released under the name Johnny Burnette. It sold fewer than 200 copies. There is some disagreement over the year in which this single was released. The Guinness Book Of Rock Stars suggests that the year was 1953, but other sources suggest 1954, and others suggest November 1955.

The trio were said to have auditioned for Sun Records but were turned down by Sam Phillips, apparently because they sounded too much like Elvis Presley. Whether or not this audition took place, however, remains a matter of dispute. Dorsey Burnette has stated that they recorded a demo session for Sun. He said, "We took Sam Phillips some songs and he turned 'em down, but they weren't very good anyway." In an article for TV Radio Mirror, Johnny Burnette recalled that he and Dorsey had auditioned for Sun Records and had been chased back onto the street when the fiddler's bridge broke. No tapes of any such audition have ever been found, although this could be explained by the fact that Sam Phillips was prone to record over tapes. More importantly, however, Burlison later insisted that the group did not audition at Sun at all, and he recalled the incident of the fiddler's bridge taking place during the recording of "Go Mule Go". If they did not, they were one of the few KWEM regulars not to do so. As the trio was only a loose aggregation until 1956, then it is possible that the Burnettes may have auditioned at Sun without Burlison. Sources also vary as to the time of the alleged audition. Some suggest 1954, but others have put it in early 1956, with only Dorsey and Johnny Burnette present.

From 1954 to February 1956, the trio played at the Hideaway Club in Middleton, Tennessee, with the Doc MacQueen Swing Band. As well as their work with the band they were to have an intermission spot of their own, and by 1956 the trio had built a strong reputation in and around Memphis. But the earnings from these session did not provide them with enough on which to live, and so all three had daytime jobs. Both Paul Burlison and Dorsey Burnette were working for the Crown Electric Company as journeyman and apprentice electrician respectively, and Johnny held down a number of jobs, including one selling dishes and appliances door to door, another as a Repo Man and also as a deck hand on barges traversing the Mississippi River. In February/March 1956, Paul Burlison and Dorsey Burnette were laid off from Crown Electric. As they both needed to secure regular pay-cheques, they decided to drive to New York in the hope of gaining jobs there through the electrician's union.

Paul Burlison was to later recall that "they could not make it alone on what they were being paid on Friday and Saturday nights at the Hideaway. So we thought, until things picked up in Memphis, they would go to New York and work awhile." After discussing the move with their wives and other family members, the trio drove to New York through one of the worst snowstorms to hit the Northeast in many years. They stopped off briefly in Brownsville in order to inform Doc McQueen of their move. McQueen is reported to have said, "Let me know if you make it big."

When they arrived in New York, they took rooms in the YMCA. Paul and Dorsey started work as electricians, and Johnny worked in the garment district. They then found out about the Wednesday night auditions for the Ted Mack Original Amateur Hour, and they joined the endless queue of show business hopefuls. Elvis Presley had only hit the big time in late January 1956, and someone in the Mack audition crew thought that the Burnettes and Burlison might reach the same market. So they were given the fast track and appeared on the show, which was networked nationally by ABC. They won three straight appearances in April and May 1956, which gained them a slot on the finalists' tour on 9 September 1956, their appearance being unfortunately telecast live from New York opposite to that of Elvis Presley's first appearance at the Ed Sullivan Show which was also beamed live from Los Angeles, and capturing the highest share in the history of US television, an 82.6%, which meant the finals of the Arthur Godfrey Show were seen by less than 5 million viewers. A newspaper clip on the day after their third win on the Ted Mack Show referred to them as "the Rock and Roll Boys from Memphis".

Between their second and third appearances, they were spotted by Bill Randle, who was a disc-jockey on WERE, Cleveland. Randle telephoned his friend Henry Jerome, who was a band leader at the Hotel Edison at the time, and he told Jerome to watch the trio's next appearance on television. Jerome was impressed by what he saw that he contacted the Burnettes and Burlison and signed them to a management contract. He got Johnny a daytime job as an elevator operator at the Hotel Edison and moved the trio there from the YMCA. He secured a contract for the trio with GAC (General Artist Corporation) and with the Coral division of Decca Records. Paul Burlison was to say later that he believed that they made a mistake by signing with Coral Records. "Capitol Records was after us, ABC Paramount, Chess and Decca," Burlison remembered. "I wanted to go to Capitol but they said it didn't matter, a hit record would make us rich."

It was at this time that the Burnettes and Burlison formally adopted the name of the Rock and Roll Trio. This was something of a compromise, which was reached after Johnny's suggestion of the Burnette Brothers had been countered by Burlison's suggestion of the Burlison Brothers. They had already rejected the name, the Rock and Roll Boys from Memphis. Jerome also set up a corporation called Pajad (PA-ul, J-ohnny A-nd D-orsey) Enterprises in which the proceeds of their earnings were to be split equally for five years. Jerome placed the boys on salary and he would later cut himself in for composer's royalties on some of the tunes, working under the pseudonym of Al Mortimer.

After signing with Coral, the Rock and Roll Trio were placed with A & R director Bob Thiele, who took them to the Pythian Temple in New York City for their first recording session. The Pythian Temple was where Bill Haley & His Comets had cut "Rock Around the Clock".

The first session was held on 7 May 1956, and before the session began, Johnny, Dorsey and Paul were surprised to find the 32-piece Dick Jacobs Orchestra sitting in the studio. They were to be paid the union scale of $41.25 each to sit and watch the Rock and Roll Trio perform their original rockabilly tunes. Only the drummer, Eddie Gray, who had his own group called Eddie Gray and the Commanders, was used on the sessions. The session began with "Shattered Dreams", which was a George Motola tune. The Rock and Roll Trio did not feel comfortable with it, and the results were considered unsuitable for commercial release. Bob Thiele had, however, listened to the early Carl Perkins and Elvis Presley recordings, and he talked to the boys about creating their own sound. He had decided that a sound awash in treble would be the key to success. He told Burlison to turn up the treble on the amp, which created a pinched, stinging tone to Paul's lead guitar. The rest of the session produced four songs, "Midnight Train", "Tear It Up", "Oh Baby Babe" and a reprise of the old Von cut "You're Undecided".

On May 26, 1956, Coral released the Trio's first single "Tear It Up" backed with "You're Undecided" (Coral 61651), and they jumped into Dorsey's 1955 Ford for appearances on Dick Clark's American Bandstand, Steve Allen's Tonight Show and Perry Como's Kraft Music Hall. They were on their way as a touring act and ready to bring rockabilly into American homes. The record sold strongly in many markets, becoming a hit in Boston and Baltimore, but it failed to make the national charts. With only one single left in the can, Coral rushed Johnny, Paul and Dorsey back into the studio, but this time it was to be in Owen Bradley's Studio at 804 16th Avenue South, Nashville, Tennessee, from July 2–5, 1956 and teamed up with Buddy Harman on drums for the full session and the great Grady Martin on guitar for July 5.

These sessions were judged to have been enormously successful, and on August 4, 1956, Coral released a second single: "Midnight Train" backed with "Oh Baby Babe" (Coral 61675). This again failed to make the national charts, and without a hit record, the trio needed to play live dates in order to promote themselves and more particularly to earn money. During the summer of 1956, they toured with Ted Mack's Touring show and with Carl Perkins and Gene Vincent. On September 9, 1956, they appeared on the final of the Ted Mack Original Amateur Hour at Madison Square Garden, where amongst other songs, they played "Tear It Up" and "Hound Dog". As a result of this appearance, on October 13, 1956, Coral issued their third single, "The Train Kept A-Rollin'" backed with "Honey Hush" (Coral 61719), but again, it failed make the national charts.

Having used a drummer on their Nashville recording sessions, it was decided to add a drummer to their line-up. When the Trio told Carl Perkins that they were looking for a drummer, Perkins recommended his cousin Tony Austin, who had played a few dates with him around their hometown of Jackson, Tennessee, before he had recruited W. S. Holland. Following Perkins' recommendation, the Burnettes swung through to pick him up, and Austin became part of the group.

After Austin was hired, Henry Jerome started billing the group as Johnny Burnette and the Rock and Roll Trio on live dates. This name was used on their first two singles, and on their third single they were known as The Johnny Burnette Trio. Dorsey was incensed by this as he had taken the lead on a few songs, including "Sweet Love On My Mind", "My Love You´re A Stranger" and "Blues Stay Away From Me". He wanted to retain the more democratic name Rock and Roll Trio despite the fact that the group was now a quartet. The band was constantly on the road, completing what seemed to be an endless stream of one-night stands in order to cover their living expenses. This exhausting regime led to squabbles, which were exacerbated by lack of chart success. These squabbles finally came to a head at a gig in Niagara Falls in the Fall of 1956, where, after a fight, Dorsey quit the group and handed back his band uniform. This happened a week before the Trio were due to appear in Alan Freed's movie Rock, Rock, Rock.

== New line-up ==
Burlison and Johnny Burnette hastily recruited Johnny Black, the brother of Elvis's bassist Bill Black, as a replacement for Dorsey, and his uniform was cut down to Johnny Black's size. The remains of Pajad Corp. bought Black an acoustic bass and placed him on salary. He joined the group in time to be filmed in their spot in the movie, where they played "Lonesome Train (On A Lonesome Track)". To coincide with the release of the film, a fourth Coral single, "Lonesome Train (On A Lonesome Track)" backed with "I Just Found Out" (Coral 61758), was released on January 5, 1957, under the name of the Johnny Burnette Trio, but, like the group's earlier releases, it failed to chart.

In the meantime, Dorsey returned to Memphis and found himself a lead guitarist and a bassist whilst he switched to rhythm guitar and vocals. Calling themselves Dorsey Burnette and the Rock and Roll Trio, they briefly toured the South before calling it quits.

Despite their earlier failures, Coral still seemed to have faith in the commercial future of the Rock and Roll Trio, even with their revamped line-up. On March 22, 1957, they organized what was to be the Trio's last recording session at the Bradley Studio in Nashville, Tennessee. On this occasion, however, the identity of the personnel involved is open to question. Adam Komorowski has stated that despite the split, Dorsey was forced to attend this session because of contractual obligations. According to the discography used by Colin Escott of Showtime Magazine, Dorsey, Johnny and Paul took part in this session. According to Nashville session double bassist Bob Moore who was present at the Nashville sessions, Dorsey and Paul were replaced by himself and Grady Martin. The 1957 sessions are clearly more in line with the contemporary Nashville sound of the day and without the same rockabilly upbeat tempos produced in the 1956 sessions of the trio recorded in New York, followed by Nashville 1956 sessions.

French researchers Gilles Vignal and Marc Alesina, however, have produced a discography which has only Johnny Burnette present at the session. According to them, Burnette played acoustic guitar and sang vocals, whilst Thomas Grady Martin played electric guitar, Bob L. Moore played string bass and Farris Coursey was on drums. On this session, four tracks, "Touch Me", "If You Want Enough", "Butterfingers" and "Eager Beaver Baby" were cut. Taking a cue from Elvis and the Jordanaires, Owen Bradley lined up a vocal group for two tracks: "Butterfingers" and "If You Want It Enough". Following the session Burnett and the Trio toured with Gene Vincent, and in published snapshots, only Johnny Burnette, Paul Burlison and Johnny Black appear with Gene Vincent.

On May 20, 1957, Coral released a fifth single, "Eager Beaver Baby" backed with "Touch Me" (Coral 61829), and on September 2, 1957, they released a sixth single "Drinking Wine, Spo-Dee-O-Dee" backed with "Butterfingers" (Coral 61869). In both cases, these singles were released under the name of Johnny Burnette, but neither of these releases had any chart success. Also in 1957, Coral released a 10" LP, which was entitled Johnny Burnette and the Rock 'n Roll Trio (Coral CRL 57080). It did not include their first single "Tear It Up".

== Split up ==
By the Fall of 1957, the Trio had become dispirited by this lack of success, and they were tiring of the endless one-nighters, so they decided to split up. A seventh single, "If You Want It Enough" backed with "Rock Billy Boogie" (Coral 61918) was released on December 16, 1957, under the name of Johnny Burnette, but by that time, the Rock and Roll Trio was no more. The Burnette Brothers decided to move to California and try their luck there. Paul Burlison joined them there briefly but decided to return to Memphis and retire from the music business. Had the Burnettes decided to follow Burlison's example, then the Rock and Roll Trio may well have become just another forgotten 1950s group.

The Burnette Brothers success as songwriters in 1958 and 1959 and their individual, but varying, degrees of success in 1960 and 1961 as solo artists helped to keep the group's memory alive. This success was to lead to one more single record release by Coral. In April 1960, following Johnny Burnette's success on Liberty Records as a solo artist, Coral released "Blues Stay Away From Me" backed with "Midnight Train" (Coral 62190), under the name Johnny and Dorsey Burnette. This record, like its predecessors, however, failed to chart.

With the rise to fame in the 1960s of groups like the Beatles and the Yardbirds, with their professed admiration for the Rock and Roll Trio, interest in the group was rekindled. The Beatles covered "Lonesome Tears In My Eyes" and "Honey Hush" at live gigs and on BBC Radio. The Yardbirds, when Jeff Beck and Jimmy Page were part of the line-up, covered "The Train Kept A Rollin" and their own rewrite of that song, "Stroll On". "Stroll On" was featured in the 1966 Michelangelo Antonioni film Blow Up.

British pirate radio DJ Mike Raven plugged the Trio's original 1957 LP, and this prompted Decca to reissue it as a 12" LP in Britain on their budget Ace of Hearts label in 1966. Around 1970, a second LP entitled Tear It Up, which contained much of their unreleased material from 1956/7, was also released.

== Ending ==
Johnny Burnette died in a boating accident on Clear Lake, California, in August 1964, while Dorsey continued to write songs and remained successful in this field. He also continued performing and reached the US country chart with 15 minor hits during the 1970s, before he died of a heart attack in August 1979.

Dorsey's death may well have prompted Paul Burlison to return to the music scene in the 1980s, first with Johnny Black and Tony Austin in a recreation of the Rock and Roll Trio. In 1997, he cut his first ever solo LP Train Kept A-Rollin on Sweetfish Records as a tribute to The Rock and Roll Trio. The LP contained eleven tracks, three of which, "Train Kept A-Rollin'", "Lonesome Tears in My Eyes", and "Lonesome Train (on a Lonesome Track)", had been featured on the Rock and Roll Trio's original 1957 album. Among the backing musicians were Rocky Burnette (Johnny's son) and Billy Burnette (Dorsey's son).

When asked about his post-Trio relationship with the Burnette Brothers, Paul Burlison made the following comments, "A year after I did that short tour with Johnny, I was working on my car one day and my wife called me to the phone. It was Dorsey and he told me that Johnny was missing out on a lake 109 miles (175 km) from San Francisco. He asked me to come out there and I left on the midnight flight. [...] We hadn't been too close since all the trouble, although Johnny and I had been real close. After that there wasn't two weeks went by that Dorsey and I didn't talk to each other until his death in 1979."

Paul Burlison died on September 27, 2003, in Horn Lake, Mississippi, from cancer. The pioneering contribution to the genre by all three of the original members of the Rock and Roll Trio has been recognized by the Rockabilly Hall of Fame and the Memphis Music Hall of Fame.

== Legacy ==
Led Zeppelin guitarist Jimmy Page remarked:

Lonnie Donegan inspired everyone [to play guitar] because he made it look as though it was possible to do. But who really moved it out of just playing acoustic to electric was all those people that were playing in the 1950s. Initially, it was the rockabilly-style guitar, the Johnny Burnette Rock and Roll Trio. When you heard that, it was just something that inspired you so much to want to play out of the box as it's so abstract, the guitar playing.
