= Johnny Burnette and the Rock 'n Roll Trio =

Studio album by Johnny Burnette and the Rock 'n Roll Trio
- Released: December 1956
- Recorded: May 7 and July 2–5, 1956
- Studio: Pythian Temple (New York, New York); Owen Bradley Studio (Nashville, Tennessee)
- Genre: Rockabilly
- Label: Coral Records
- Producer: Owen Bradley

Johnny Burnette and the Rock 'n Roll Trio chronology
Johnny Burnette and the Rock 'n Roll Trio (1956)	Dreamin (1960)

Professional ratings
Review scores
Source	Rating
AllMusic	4.5/5 stars

Johnny Burnette and the Rock 'n Roll Trio is the 1956 debut album of the rockabilly band The Rock and Roll Trio, fronted by Johnny Burnette. Recorded over three separate sessions in 1956, the album includes a number of the band's singles. 2008's Icons of Rock calls the album "an all-time rockabilly classic". Released as a 10" LP in the UK by Vogue/Coral Records in December 1956 (#10041), it was released again in 12" format in its US debut by Coral Records in 1957 (#57080) and in 1978 by Solid Smoke (#8001). A few years previously, there had also been an unauthorized reissue of the album which featured an exact reproduction of the cover and label, although differences in label and cover formatting noted by collectors reveal it as a reprint. In 1993, it was released on compact disc by Aris Records (MCD 30489). 1998's Go Cat Go!: Rockabilly Music and Its Makers characterizes the CD reissue as "legendary and essential."

== Background ==
When the Memphis-based Rock and Roll Trio relocated to New York in the hopes of finding the fame that had eluded them in their native South, they signed with Coral Records and entered the studio, recording a total of 25 tracks for the label over five sessions between May 7, 1956 and March 22, 1957. The first session took place on May 7, 1956 at the Pythian Temple in New York City. The second series took place almost two months later and over eight hundred miles away, at the Owen Bradley Studio in Nashville, Tennessee from July 2 through July 5. Tracks from those two sessions, including several singles by the band, were collected and released in December 1956 as the band's first album. The band's recordings have exerted a strong influence over subsequent rockabilly artists, although the band did not themselves enjoy broad success at the time. The Encyclopedia of Recorded Sound indicates an ever more widespread influence, suggesting that "the sheer verve and energy communicated by the brother's records influenced the aesthetics of British and American rock stars in the 1960s and 1970s."

== Songs ==
A number of the songs are regarded as classics of the rockabilly genre, particularly the trio-penned "Tear It Up", released on single on June 5, 1956, and their definitive cover of "Train Kept A'Rollin'". "Tear It Up" did not enter the charts, but enjoyed regional popularity and has subsequently been covered by a number of artists, including Charlie Feathers, Rod Stewart and Stray Cats. Even though the song was the band's first single on Coral, it was not originally included in the album, appearing on the CD rerelease.

Other singles, however, were, including their biggest seller, "Train Kept A'Rollin'". The Rough Guide Music USA indicates the band is best known for their rendition of this song. In Billy Poore's Rockabilly: A Forty-Year Journey, he describes the single "Train Kept A'Rollin'", backed with "Honey Hush", as "two of the best all-time rockabilly cuts ever", "what pure, scorching, unrestrained rockabilly music should sound like". Among its notable features, "Train Kept A'Rollin'" displayed a ground-breaking fuzzed guitar. This resulted from an accident, when a valve in the amplifier of the guitarist Paul Burlison came loose before a gig in Philadelphia. The distorted sound that resulted proved so popular that Burlison intentionally repeated it in future performance. It is noted as one of the first uses of guitar distortion on a recorded session.

== Track listing ==
Except where otherwise noted, all songs by Paul Burlison, Dorsey Burnette and Johnny Burnette (sometimes under pen name Al Mortimer)

=== Side one ===
1. "Honey Hush" (Big Joe Turner) – 1:59
2. "Lonesome Train (on a Lonesome Track)" (Glen Moore, Milton Subotsky) – 2:09
3. "Sweet Love on My Mind" (Wayne Walker) – 2:26
4. "Rock Billy Boogie" – 2:33
5. "Lonesome Tears in My Eyes" – 2:05
6. "All by Myself" (Dave Bartholomew, Fats Domino) – 2:04

=== Side two ===
1. "Train Kept A-Rollin'" (Tiny Bradshaw, Howard Kay, Lois Mann) – 2:13
2. "I Just Found Out" – 2:18
3. "Your Baby Blue Eyes" – 2:09
4. "Chains of Love" (Ahmet Nugetre) – 2:35
5. "I Love You So" (Henry Jerome) – 2:15
6. "Drinking Wine, Spo-Dee-O-Dee" (Stick McGhee, J. Mayo Williams) – 2:11

=== 1993 CD release ===
1. "Honey Hush" (Turner) – 1:59
2. "Lonesome Train (on a Lonesome Track)" (Moore, Subotsky) – 2:09
3. "Sweet Love on My Mind" – 2:26
4. "Rock Billy Boogie" – 2:33
5. "Lonesome Tears in My Eyes" – 2:05
6. "All by Myself" (Bartholomew, Domino) – 2:04
7. "The Train Kept A-Rollin'" (Bradshaw, Kay, Mann) – 2:13
8. "I Just Found Out" – 2:18
9. "Your Baby Blue Eyes" – 2:09
10. "Chains of Love" (Nugetre) – 2:35
11. "I Love You So" (Jerome) – 2:15
12. "Drinking Wine, Spo-Dee-O-Dee" (McGhee, Williams) – 2:11
13. "Rock Therapy" (Subotsky) – 2:14
14. "Blues Stay Away from Me" (Alton Delmore, Rabon Delmore, Henry Glover, Wayne Raney) – 2:12
15. "Eager Beaver Baby" (Stanley Clayton, Bill Katz, Ruth Ann Roberts) – 2:01
16. "You're Undecided" – 1:57
17. "If You Want It Enough" (Grayson, Mel Howard) – 2:12
18. "Please Don't Leave Me" (Domino) – 2:15
19. "Touch Me" (Johnny Burnette, Hyde, James M. Smith) – 2:23
20. "Tear It Up" – 1:52

== Personnel ==
- Tony Austin – drums
- Paul Burlison – electric guitar
- Dorsey Burnette – bass fiddle
- Johnny Burnette – vocals, rhythm guitar
- Eddie Gray – drums
- Grady Martin – guitar
