= Lonesome Tears in My Eyes =

1956 song by Johnny Burnette

"Lonesome Tears in My Eyes" is a song written by Johnny Burnette, Dorsey Burnette, Paul Burlison and Al Mortimer. It was first released by co-writer Johnny Burnette and his Rock 'n' Roll Trio in December 1956, (Note: Some sources stands that the release year was 1957.) and has been covered by various artists, including the Beatles.

== Original version ==
"Lonesome Tears in My Eyes"

Song by Johnny Burnette

from the album Johnny Burnette and the Rock 'n Roll Trio
- Released: December 1956
- Recorded: May–July 1956
- Genre: Rockabilly
- Length: 2:05
- Label: Coral Records
- Songwriters: Johnny Burnette, Dorsey Burnette, Paul Burlison and Al Mortimer

Johnny Burnette, recorded "Lonesome Tears in My Eyes" for his studio album Johnny Burnette and the Rock 'n Roll Trio, the song was composed together with Dorsey Burnette (his brother), Paul Burlison and Al Mortimer.

The UK label Mabel's Record Co. release it unofficially as a single along with "Your Baby Blue Eyes" on B-side.

=== Personnel ===
- Tony Austin – drums
- Paul Burlison – electric guitar
- Dorsey Burnette – bass fiddle
- Johnny Burnette – vocals, rhythm guitar
- Eddie Gray – drums
- Grady Martin – guitar

== The Beatles version ==
"Lonesome Tears in My Eyes"

Song by The Beatles

from the album Live at the BBC
- Released: 30 November 1994
- Recorded: 10 July 1963
- Length: 2:36
- Label: Apple
- Songwriters: Johnny Burnette, Dorsey Burnette, Paul Burlison and Al Mortimer
- Producer: Terry Henebery

The Beatles, recorded "Lonesome Tears in My Eyes" "live in studio" for the BBC radio programme Pop Go the Beatles on 10 July 1963, and later transmitted on 23 July. In 1994, their recording was commercially released on the album Live at the BBC. The intro guitar riff is reused for the outro riff to a later Beatles song, "The Ballad of John and Yoko". On the BBC recording, John Lennon introduces the song as "recorded in 1822".

=== Personnel ===
- John Lennon – vocals, lead guitar
- Paul McCartney – bass
- George Harrison – guitar
- Ringo Starr – drums

== Covers ==
Other artists that have covered the song include:

- The Crank Tones
- Los Fabulocos
- The Four Charms
- Frantic Flintstone
- The Go Getters
- Roy Kay Trio
- Sonny Rogers
- Royal Crown Revue
- Tennessee Trio
- Los Primitivos
- The Hot Shakers
