= Snearly Ranch Boys =

American rockability band of the 1950s

The Snearly Ranch Boys were a band that formed around 1950 in Memphis, Tennessee. The band was a launching platform for many of the musicians who contributed to the Memphis music scene that revolved around Sam Phillips and Sun Records. Members of the Snearly Ranch Boys included Bill Black, Jim Stewart, Jerry Lee Lewis, Reggie Young, Ace Cannon, Barbara Pittman, and Johnny Benero. A later version of the Ranch Boys centering on steel guitarist, Stan Kesler and drummer, Clyde Leoppard, who became a part of the Sun Studio session band, recording for numerous Sun artists.

The Snearly Ranch Boys were regular live performers at radio station KWEM in West Memphis, Arkansas and Memphis, Tennessee. They were also the house band at the Cotton Club in West Memphis, playing there 5 night a week through the late 1950s. The Snearly Ranch Boys and its revolving roster of band members influenced the careers of other musicians and groups, including Elvis Presley, Stax Records, Hi Records, the Bill Black Combo, and the music that would become known as "The Memphis Sound". The band was part of the evolution of music that resulted in the new musical styles of rockabilly and rock 'n roll.

== History ==
The Snearly Ranch Boys formed in late 1949. The band was composed of musicians who were living in a boarding house located at 233 N. McNeil Street in Memphis. The house was owned by Omah "Ma" Snearly, a kind hearted woman who took in only musicians. Her boarders affectionately dubbed it the "Snearly Ranch House", and soon started booking as the "Snearly Ranch Boys" and secured a regular spot on KWEM radio.

During the next ten years, the line up of the "Ranch Boys" changed frequently as musicians drifted in and out of Memphis, or became recording artists and moved on. On some nights, according to band member Al Vescova, there might be three versions of the Snearly Ranch Boys playing gigs in Tennessee, Mississippi and Arkansas.

By the early 1950s drummer Clyde Leoppard became band leader and manager of the Ranch Boys. They were sometimes billed as "Clyde Leoppard and the Snearly Ranch Boys". Leoppard owned and operated his own boarding house and restaurant behind the Greyhound Bus Station in downtown Memphis on Hernando Street. The group became well known as a country and western band in the Memphis area during the 1950s. Many of the members of the Ranch Boys are now famous for their contributions to the American music scene. Over the years members of the Ranch Boys actually contributed to more Gold and Platinum records (close to 400) than the Beatles (141 records).

In February 1955, the Snearly Ranch Boys released a record recorded by Sam Phillips at Sun Records on a new label started by Sam called "Flip Records". Following their own release, the Snearly Ranch Boys became part of the SUN Records studio band backing up Snearly Ranch band members who became SUN recording artists such as Barbara Pittman, Smokey Joe Baugh, Warren Smith, Johnny Benero, the Miller Sisters, Bill Taylor, Jean Chapel, Marcus Van Story, and the Kirby Sisters as well as other new Sun artists.

Stan Kesler, steel player for the Ranch Boys, became a Sun Records recording engineer, wrote five songs that were recorded by Elvis Presley, and produced many bands including Sam the Sham and the Pharaohs. He also assembled studio bands for American Studios in Memphis and Atlantic Records in Miami, Florida. Jim Stewart, the future founder of Stax Records in Memphis, played fiddle with the Ranch Boys. Jerry Lee Lewis, Ace Cannon, and Bill Black all had short tenures with the band. American guitar legend, Reggie Young, who has over 200 Gold or Platinum records to his credit, played for the Ranch Boys.

Other notable Snearly Ranch Boys' members include Paul Burlison, a guitarist for "Johnny Burnette and the Rock 'n Roll Trio" who also appeared in the Alan Freed movie, "Rock, Rock, Rock"; Albert Vescova, steel guitarist for the "Tonight Show" band and prominent Hollywood actor; Ramsey Kearney, Nashville recording artist and studio owner; Jumpin' Gene Simmons, recording artist with hit song "Haunted House"; Hayden Thompson, a rockabilly recording star; Eddie Bond, Rockabilly star and DJ; Kenneth Herman, steel guitar and session musician for Meteor Records and Erwin Records and Ronald Smith, guitarist and session musician. Kenneth Herman and Ronald Smith performed on KWEM Radio with Elvis Presley in 1953.

Many other musicians performed with the Ranch Boys, including Buddy Holobaugh, Jan Ledbetter, Jimmy Knight, and Jack Leoppard.
