= Johnny Burnette =

American musician (1934–1964)

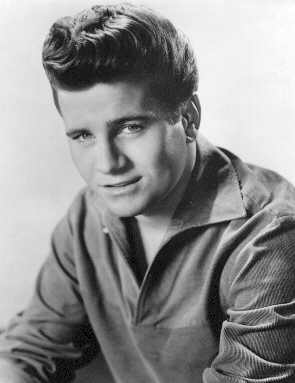
- Burnette in 1964

Background information
- Born: John Joseph Burnette; March 25, 1934; Memphis, Tennessee, U.S.
- Died: August 14, 1964 (aged 30) Clear Lake, California, U.S.
- Genres: Rockabilly; rock and roll
- Occupation: Musician
- Instruments: Vocals; acoustic guitar
- Years active: 1952–1964
- Labels: Capitol; Charly; Sahara; Liberty

Johnny Burnette, "Lonesome Train", 1956

John Joseph Burnette (March 25, 1934 – August 14, 1964) was an American singer and songwriter of rockabilly and pop music. In 1952, Johnny, his brother Dorsey Burnette, and their mutual friend Paul Burlison, formed the band that became known as the Rock and Roll Trio. His career was cut short on August 14, 1964, when he drowned following a boating accident, aged 30.

He is the father of 1980s rockabilly singer Rocky Burnette.

== Early life ==
Johnny Burnette was born to Willie May and Dorsey Burnett Sr. in Memphis, Tennessee, United States.

He showed an aptitude for sports, being on the school baseball team and playing linebacker on the football team. Both he and Dorsey were also keen amateur boxers and later became Golden Gloves champions. After leaving high school, Burnette tried his hand at becoming a professional boxer, but after one fight with a sixty-dollar purse and a broken nose, he decided to quit boxing. He went to work on barges traversing the Mississippi River, where Dorsey also worked. Johnny worked mainly as a deck hand; Dorsey worked as an oiler. After work, they would go back to Memphis and perform songs in local bars with a varying array of sidemen, including another former Golden Gloves champion, Paul Burlison, whom Dorsey had met at an amateur boxing tournament in Memphis in 1949.

== The Rock and Roll Trio ==
In 1952, the Burnette brothers and Burlison formed a group called the Rhythm Rangers. Johnny sang and played acoustic guitar, Dorsey played bass and Paul Burlison played lead guitar. For economic reasons, the three moved to New York in 1956 and managed to get an audition for Ted Mack's Original Amateur Hour. Winning the competition three times in a row gained them a place in the finals and a recording contract with Coral Records, and they renamed themselves the Rock and Roll Trio. They also gained a manager, the bandleader Henry Jerome, and a drummer, Tony Austin (a cousin of Carl Perkins).

Promotional appearances were arranged on Dick Clark's American Bandstand, Steve Allen's Tonight Show and Perry Como's Kraft Music Hall, together with a summer tour with Carl Perkins and Gene Vincent. On Sunday September 9, 1956, they appeared as finalists on the Original Amateur Hour at Madison Square Garden, singing "Hound Dog". Despite this activity, the three singles this rock and roll trio had released over this period failed to reach any national hit parade. This might be due to a result of Elvis Presley who appeared on a CBS television program that was broadcast live from Los Angeles, CA at exactly the same time that this Burnette trio had performed on ABC televised "Original Amateur Hour" in New York. Furthermore, the CBS show that had broadcast Elvis in Los Angeles, had garnered an 82.6% share, or 60,710,000 viewers, whereas the ABC and NBC networks had garnered less than 5 million viewers each.

Johnny Black, the brother of Elvis's bassist Bill Black, was rapidly recruited to fill Dorsey's place. Despite the film appearance and three more single releases and one LP release, the group failed to achieve any chart success. The Rock and Roll Trio disbanded in autumn 1957.

== Success in California with Ricky Nelson ==
The Burnettes' brashness got them their first success in the music business in California. On arriving in Los Angeles, Joe Campbell bought a copy of "A Map to the Stars", which showed the location of the house of the teen idol Ricky Nelson. In an effort to get their songs to him, the Burnettes and Campbell decided to sit on the steps of his house until they could get a meeting with him. Their persistence worked, and Nelson was sufficiently impressed with their work that he eventually recorded several of their songs, including "Believe What You Say", "It's Late", "Waitin' in School", and "Just a Little Too Much", amongst others. Other Imperial Records artists, such as Roy Brown, benefited from their songwriting. The success of his recording of the brothers' "Hip Shakin' Baby" led to a recording contract with Imperial Records as a duo. While in California, they met Doyle Holly, who played bass guitar for a short time with the band. Holly went on to become the bass player for Buck Owens and the Buckaroos and to record as a solo artist.

As the Burnette Brothers, they released one single, for Imperial, "Warm Love" backed with "My Honey" (Imperial X5509), on May 5, 1958. It did not make the charts. After this failure, they continued to work together as songwriters but began to follow separate careers as performing artists. In 1961, however, Johnny and Dorsey released two instrumental singles, credited to the Texans, for two small labels, Infinity and Gothic: "Green Grass of Texas" backed with "Bloody River" (Infinity INX-001), released on February 20, 1961, and "Rockin' Johnny Home" backed with "Ole Reb" (Gothic GOX-001), released on May 29, 1961. Another instrumental, "Lonely Island" backed with"Green Hills" (Liberty 55460), credited to the Shamrocks, was released by Liberty Records on June 6, 1962. "Green Grass of Texas" and "Bloody River" were to be re-released in February 1965 on the Vee Jay label (VJ 658), again credited to the Texans.

== Solo career ==
=== The Liberty years ===
In the fall of 1958, Johnny Burnette obtained a recording contract as a solo artist with Freedom Records, an offshoot of Liberty Records. He released three singles on this label: "Kiss Me" backed with "I'm Restless" (44001), released on September 11, 1958; "Gumbo" backed with "Me and the Bear" (44011), released on March 6, 1959; and "Sweet Baby Doll" backed with "I'll Never Love Again" (44017), released on June 24, 1959. All of these songs except "Sweet Baby Doll" were written by Burnette. None of these records were hits.

In mid-1959, the Freedom label was shut down, and Burnette moved to the parent Liberty label, under the direction of the producer Snuff Garrett. Liberty had better promotional capabilities than Freedom, so that Johnny's singles for Liberty stood a greater chance of succeeding. His first two singles for Liberty, "Settin' the Woods on Fire" backed with "Kentucky Waltz" (Liberty F-55222), released on November 10, 1959, and "Patrick Henry" backed with "Don't Do It" (Liberty F-55243), released on March 4, 1960, sold well regionally but were not national hits. However, his third single, "Dreamin'" backed with "Cincinnati Fireball" (Liberty F-55285), released on May 4, 1960, reached number 11 on the Billboard Hot 100 and number 5 in Britain. It sold over one million copies and was awarded a gold disc by the RIAA.

His fourth Liberty single, "You're Sixteen" (written by the Sherman Brothers) backed with "I Beg Your Pardon" (Liberty F-55285), released on October 5, 1960, did even better, reaching number 8 on the Hot 100 and number 3 in the UK Singles Chart, and earned another gold record for him. Burnette went back into the studio and under Snuff Garrett's direction recorded "Little Boy Sad". This was released on January 3, 1961, backed with "(I Go) Down to the River" (Liberty F-55298). Shortly after its release, Burnette was hospitalized with a ruptured appendix, which kept him bedridden for several weeks. He was unable to undertake many personal appearances to promote the new record, and it reached only number 17 on the Billboard Hot 100 and number 12 in Britain. Frustrated by this prolonged inactivity he tried to return to work too early, and he promptly collapsed. This meant that his fifth Liberty single, "Big Big World" backed with "Ballad of the One Eyed Jacks" (Liberty F-55318), released on March 30, 1961, received no promotion at all and reached only number 58 on the Hot 100.

His sixth Liberty single, "I've Got a Lot of Things to Do" backed with "Girls" (Liberty F-55345), released June 14, 1961, was handled differently from his previous records. In Britain, the upbeat side, "Girls", was promoted as the topside and reached number 23 in the UK chart in September 1961. In the United States it was flipped over with "I've Got a Lot of Things to Do" as the topside, but despite heavy promotion it failed to become a hit, peaking just outside the Hot 100 at number 109.

After recovering from his illness, Burnette returned to the road with a tour of Northern cities, culminating in a season at the Brooklyn Paramount Theatre, after which he undertook a tour of Australia with Connie Francis. Back in the limelight, his next release was scheduled to be a Carl Perkins song, "Fools Like Me", backed with "Honestly I Do" (Liberty 55377), but this was canceled in favor of "God, Country and My Baby" backed with "Honestly I Do" (Liberty 55379), which was released on September 27, 1961. It reached number 18 on the Hot 100, but was to be Burnette's last major American hit.

In 1962, Burnette toured Britain for the first time, with Gary U.S. Bonds and Gene McDaniels, where he made an appearance on the New Musical Express Poll Winners' Concert and several TV appearances. His next single "Clown Shoes" backed with "The Way I Am" (Liberty 55416) was released on January 26, 1962, but it failed to make the US Hot 100. It was more successful in Britain, where it reached number 35. "Clown Shoes" was written by P. J. Proby.

Burnette had two more single releases on Liberty Records. These were "The Fool of the Year" backed with "The Poorest Boy in Town" (Liberty 55448), which was released on April 13, 1962, and "Damn the Defiant" backed with "Lonesome Waters" (Liberty 55489), which was released on July 30, 1962. Neither of these singles was a hit, but "Damn the Defiant", a Johnny Horton–style naval saga, was Burnette's first self-penned A-side for Liberty, It was also his last single for the label.

=== The Chancellor stint ===
Burnette moved to Chancellor Records, which had had success with teen idols like Fabian Forte and Frankie Avalon. Chancellor released three singles by Burnette in 1962: "I Wanna Thank Your Folks" backed with "The Giant" (Chancellor C-1116), "Tag Along" backed with "Party Girl" (Chancellor C-1123) and "Remember Me (I'm the One Who Loves You)" backed with "Time Is Not Enough" (Chancellor C-1129). None of these singles were hits.

=== The Capitol sessions ===
Burnette moved on from Chancellor, briefly joining Dorsey on Reprise Records for one single, "Hey Sue" backed with "It Don't Take Much" (20153), before signing a one-year contract with Capitol Records in the summer of 1963. Johnny's first recording session was held on July 23, 1963, at the Capitol Tower with Jim Economides and Jimmie Haskell overseeing the proceedings. A number of tracks were recorded: "It Isn't There", "Wish It Were Saturday Night", "I'll Give You Three Guesses", "All Week Long" and "Congratulations, You've Hurt Me Again". Of these "It Isn't There" backed with "Wish It Were Saturday Night" (Capitol 5023) were issued on August 19, 1963, as his first American single. In Britain, the flipside was changed to "All Week Long", but neither single made the charts. On December 13, 1963, a second session was held, with the same two men in charge. Four more songs were recorded, of which "The Opposite" backed with "You Taught Me the Way to Love You" (Capitol 5114) was released as a single on January 20, 1964. Again it failed to find chart success. A third session was held on February 14, 1964, which produced four songs: "Aunt Marie", "Two Feet in Front of Me", "If I Were An Artist", and "And Her Name Is Scarlett". None of these songs were deemed fit for release and remained in the can for thirty years. A fourth session was held on March 16, 1964, which was overseen by David Gates, who later went on to fame with the band Bread. This session produced "Sweet Suzie, I Think She Knows" and "It All Depends on Linda", which was written by Bobby Bare. Of these songs, "Sweet Suzie" backed with "Walkin' Talkin' Doll", which had been held back from the December 1963 session, were released as Capitol single (Capitol 5176) on April 5, 1964. This single also failed to make the charts.

=== Sahara and Magic Lamp labels ===
When his Capitol contract ran out, Burnette decided to take charge of his own affairs on his own terms. He formed his own label Sahara and in July 1964 released the single "Fountain of Love" backed with "What a Summer Day" (Sahara 512). When he was informed that the name Sahara had already been taken, he renamed the label Magic Lamp and a different single, "Bigger Man" backed with "Less Than a Heartbeat" (Magic Lamp 515) was released.

== Death ==
On August 14, 1964, Burnette's unlit fishing boat was struck by an unaware cabin cruiser in Clear Lake, California. The impact threw him off the boat, and he drowned. When he received the news, Dorsey Burnette called Paul Burlison, who flew out to comfort him and attend Johnny's funeral. The two men were to keep in touch until Dorsey's death of a heart attack in 1979. Johnny Burnette is interred at Forest Lawn Memorial Park Cemetery in Glendale, California.

== Legacy ==
Burnette gained renewed prominence in 1973 thanks to Ringo Starr's version of "You're Sixteen". In addition, Burnette's original song was recognized by the Rockabilly Hall of Fame. One of his songs, "Train Kept A-Rollin'" by Tiny Bradshaw, would later be recorded by the Yardbirds, Aerosmith and Motörhead. Early British rock and roll power trio and proto punk garage band Johnny Kidd and the Pirates and psychobilly band The Meteors both covered "Lonesome Train."

The Cramps covered his song "Tear it Up", Poison Ivy was heavily influenced by Burnette's raw guitar style and Lux Interior borrowing Burnette's vocal approach, and fellow rockabilly band Tav Falco's Panther Burns did a cover of "You're Undecided", both songs from Burnette's first album and again, heavily indebted to Burnette's quivering, emotional vocal delivery.

The Beatles, with John Lennon on vocal, performed "Lonesome Tears in My Eyes" at the BBC on July 10, 1963, for broadcast airing on July 23, 1963. During the airing Lennon introduced the song, originally recorded by Johnny Burnette and the Rock 'n Roll Trio on July 3, 1956, and released in March 1957, joking, "This is a Dorsey Burnette number, brother of Johnny Burnette, called 'Lonesome Tears in My Eyes', recorded on their very first LP in 1822!" The song also influenced a later Beatles song, "The Ballad of John and Yoko" in that the outro guitar riff to that song was inspired by the corresponding intro guitar riff on "Lonesome Tears in My Eyes". This live in-studio recording of "Lonesome Tears in My Eyes" (including Lennon's spoken intro) was later included on the Beatles' 1994 two-CD set, Live at the BBC.

== Quotation ==
My brother Dorsey and I first got to know Elvis Presley when he went to Humes High and we went to the Catholic High... Elvis would tote his guitar on his back when he rode past on his motor-cycle on his way to school. He would see us and always wave.

NME, February 1961

== Discography ==
=== Studio albums ===
| Year | Album | Record label |
|---|---|---|
| 1957 | Johnny Burnette and the Rock 'n Roll Trio | Coral Records |
| 1960 | Dreamin' | Liberty Records |
| 1961 | Johnny Burnette | Liberty Records |
| 1961 | Sings | Liberty Records |
| 1962 | Roses Are Red | Liberty Records |
| 1962 | Johnny Burnette's Hits and Other Favorites | Liberty Records |

=== Compilation ===
| Year | Album | Record label |
|---|---|---|
| 2004 | The Complete Recordings 1955–1964 | Bear Family Records |

=== Singles ===
Johnny Burnette and the Rock 'n' Roll Trio

| Year | Title | Peak chart positions | | Record label | B-side | |
| Year | Title | US | UK | Record label | B-side | |
|---|---|---|---|---|---|---|
| 1956 | "Tear It Up" | – | – | Coral Records | "You're Undecided" | Tear It Up |

The Johnny Burnette Trio

| Year | Title | Peak chart positions | | Record label | B-side | Album |
| Year | Title | US | UK | Record label | B-side | Album |
|---|---|---|---|---|---|---|
| 1956 | "Oh Baby Babe" | – | – | Coral Records | "Midnight Train" | |
| 1956 | "The Train Kept a-Rollin'" | – | – | Coral Records | "Honey Hush" | Rock 'n Roll Trio |
| 1957 | "Lonesome Train (On a Lonesome Track)" | – | – | Coral Records | "I Just Found Out" | Rock 'n Roll Trio |

Johnny Burnette

| Year | Title | Peak chart positions | | Record label | B-side | Album |
| Year | Title | US | UK | Record label | B-side | Album |
|---|---|---|---|---|---|---|
| 1955 | "You're Undecided" | – | – | Von Records | "Go Mule Go" | |
| 1957 | "Eager Beaver Baby" | – | – | Coral Records | "Touch Me" | |
| 1957 | "Butterfingers" | – | – | Coral Records | "Drinking Wine, Spo-Dee-O-Dee, Drinking Wine" | |
| 1957 | "Rock Billy Boogie" | – | – | Coral Records | "If You Want It Enough" | |
| 1958 | "Kiss Me" | – | – | Freedom Records | "I'm Restless" | |
| 1959 | "Me and the Bear" | – | – | Freedom Records | "Gumbo" | |
| 1959 | "I'll Never Love Again" | – | – | Freedom Records | "Sweet Baby Doll" | |
| 1959 | "Settin' the Woods on Fire" | – | – | Liberty Records | "Kentucky Waltz" | Dreamin' |
| 1960 | "Patrick Henry" | – | – | Liberty Records | "Don't Do It" | |
| 1960 | "Dreamin'" | 11 | 5 | Liberty Records | "Cincinnati Fireball" | Dreamin' |
| 1960 | "You're Sixteen" | 8 | 3 | Liberty Records | "I Beg Your Pardon" | Johnny Burnette |
| 1961 | "Little Boy Sad" | 17 | 12 | Liberty Records | "(I Go) Down to the River" | Sings |
| 1961 | "Big Big World" | 58 | – | Liberty Records | "Ballad of the One Eyed Jacks" | Sings |
| 1961 | "Girls" | 109 | 37 | Liberty Records | "I've Got a Lot of Things to Do" | Roses Are Red |
| 1961 | "Fools Like Me" | – | – | Liberty Records | "Honestly I Do" | |
| 1961 | "God, Country and My Baby" | 18 | – | Liberty Records | "Honestly I Do" | Johnny Burnette's Hits and Other Favorites |
| 1962 | "Clown Shoes" | 113 | 35 | Liberty Records | "The Way I Am" | Roses Are Red |
| 1962 | "The Fool of the Year" | 113 | – | Liberty Records | "The Poorest Boy in Town" | Roses Are Red |
| 1962 | "I Wanna Thank Your Folks" | 117 | – | Chancellor Records | "The Giant" | |
| 1962 | "Damn the Defiant" | – | – | Liberty Records | "Lonesome Waters" | |
| 1962 | "Tag Along" | – | – | Chancellor Records | "Party Girl" | |
| 1962 | "(Remember Me) I'm the One Who Loves You" | – | – | Chancellor Records | "Time is Not Enough" | |
| 1963 | "It Isn't There" | – | – | Capitol Records | "(Wish It Were Saturday Night) All Week Long" | |
| 1964 | "You Taught Me the Way to Love You" | – | – | Capitol Records | "The Opposite" | |
| 1964 | "Sweet Suzie" | – | – | Capitol Records | "Walkin', Talkin' Doll" | |
| 1964 | "What a Summer Day" | – | – | Sahara Records | "Fountain of Love" | |
| 1964 | "Bigger Man" | – | – | Magic Lamp Records | "Less Than a Heartbeat" | |

== Other sources ==
- Johnny Burnette's Rock 'n' Roll Trio
- – for single releases 1954 to 1964, Infinity, Gothic and Vee Jay releases as the Texans, Liberty release as the Shamrocks
- The Johnny & Dorsey Burnette Discography by Gilles Vignal and Marc Alesina – For recording session details, including demo sessions 1954 to 1964
- Survey of American Popular Music by Frank Hoffmann – Dorsey and Johnny Burnette
- "Rock Billy Boogie/Johnny Burnette Trio" by Colin Escott (sleeve notes to Bear Family CD BCD 15474/AH) – general background details including original spelling of Burnette name, Dorsey Sr.'s 1939 purchase of Gene Autry guitars, boxing and 1949 meeting with Paul Burlison
- "Johnny and Dorsey/The Burnette Brothers" by Adam Komorowski (sleeve notes to Rockstar CD RSRCD 005) – early Freedom singles and possibility of Eddie Cochran's presence on Gumbo
- That's The Way I Feel: The Complete Capitol Recordings – Johnny Burnette by Adam Komorowski (sleeve notes to Rockstar CD RSRCD 006) – details of Infinity, Gothic and Vee Jay singles, Reprise single, Capitol sessions and releases, Sahara and Magic Lamp releases, death and Dorsey's reunion with Paul Burlison
- "You're Sixteen: The Best of Johnny Burnette" by Dawn Eden (sleeve notes to Liberty CD 82–99997) – broken nose and sixty dollar boxing purse, details of first meeting at the home of Ricky Nelson, details of Liberty releases, Hot 100 and UK chart positions, UK/US switch of sides "I've Got a Lot of Things to Do"/"Girls", reference to P. J. Proby, Capitol, Sahara and Magic Lamp releases
- Dreamin' Johnny Burnette – Johnny Burnette by N. E. Fulcanwright (sleeve notes to Beat Goes on CD BGOCD329) – For Johnny's ruptured appendix in 1961 and its consequences, Liberty release, Hot 100 and UK chart positions, UK/US switch of sides "I've Got a Lot of Things to Do"/"Girls", US tour and Australian tour with Connie Francis, UK 1962 tour, reference to P. J. Proby
