= Harry Edelstein =

Polish-born American restaurateur (1917–2009)

- Edelstein in 2004
- Born: December 15, 1917; Komorów, Poland
- Died: July 13, 2009 (aged 91); Englewood, New Jersey, U.S.
- Occupation: Restaurateur
- Spouse: Frances Trost (m. 1945)

Harry Edelstein (December 15, 1917 – July 13, 2009) was a Polish-born American Holocaust survivor and restaurateur.

== Life and career ==
Edelstein was born in Komorów, the son of Irving and Rachael Edelstein. His family was Jewish, and he survived the Holocaust during the occupation of Nazi Germany. He emigrated to the United States in 1948, and worked on a chicken farm in the Dorothy section of Weymouth Township, New Jersey.

In 1980, Edelstein and his wife Frances founded Cafe Edison, a theatrical coffee restaurant in the old ballroom of the Hotel Edison. Their cafe was visited by numerous notable actors, producers and writers such as Emanuel Azenberg, Neil Simon, Barry and Fran Weissler, Jackie Mason, Linda Lavin and Tony Roberts. The New York Times dubbed their cafe as the "Polish Tea Room".

In 2004, Edelstein was awarded the Tony Honors for Excellence in Theatre at the 58th Tony Awards, "for the theater community with hearty sustenance and a cheerful home-away-from-home at the Cafe Edison".

== Personal life and death ==
In 1945, Edelstein married Frances Trost in Warsaw. Their marriage lasted until Edelstein’s death in 2009. His wife Frances died in 2018.

Edelstein died in Englewood, New Jersey on July 13, 2009, at the age of 91.

== In popular culture ==
The character Bernie played by Louis Zorich from Neil Simon's 2001 comedy play 45 Seconds from Broadway, is based on Edelstein.
