= Smokey Joe Baugh =

American singer and pianist

- Also known as: Smokey Joe
- Born: Joseph Edward Baugh Jr. July 25, 1932; Helena, Arkansas, United States
- Died: November 19, 1999 (aged 67) Monterey, California, U.S.
- Genres: Rockabilly
- Occupations: Singer, pianist
- Years active: 1946–1970s
- Label: Sun
- Formerly of: Snearly Ranch Boys; Bill Black's Combo

Joseph Edward Baugh Jr. (July 25, 1932 – November 19, 1999), known as Smokey Joe Baugh or simply Smokey Joe, was an American rockabilly and country singer and pianist.

== Biography ==
Baugh was born in Helena, Arkansas, and by the age of 14 had begun playing piano semi-professionally around Memphis. Around 1952, he joined the Shelby Follin Band, where he met guitarist Paul Burlison. With Burlison, he accompanied Howlin' Wolf on radio performances on station KWEM in West Memphis. He then joined the Snearly Ranch Boys, led by Clyde Leoppard, performing and touring with them, and recorded the single "Split Personality", released on the Flip label, an offshoot of Sun Records, in early 1955, and credited to Bill Taylor (the band's trumpeter) and Smokey Jo [sic].

Sam Phillips recognized that Baugh's distinctive raspy voice could appeal to black audiences, though Baugh himself was white. He signed to Sun Records, and later in 1955 recorded "The Signifying Monkey", a song written by Bill Taylor and Stan Kesler based on traditional African American folklore. The record became successful around Memphis, and Baugh, who was assumed by the promoters to be black, was invited to perform at the Apollo Theatre in Harlem. The song formed the basis of Chuck Berry's "Jo Jo Gunne". Baugh's original recording, featuring a prototype ska rhythm of the type popularized by Millie Small's "My Boy Lollipop", was reissued in 1964, and the song was recorded about the same time by Sam the Sham. Baugh's recording has subsequently been issued on various rockabilly compilations.

Although Baugh made further recordings for Sun, including "Hula Bop" featuring Hawaiian guitar as well as Baugh's piano, most were not issued at the time, perhaps because Baugh and Phillips had a poor relationship. However, Baugh did record as a session musician on records by Warren Smith, Barbara Pittman, Carl Perkins, and others. He was also present at the "Million Dollar Quartet" recording in December 1956, with Perkins, Elvis Presley, Johnny Cash, and Jerry Lee Lewis. During the early 1960s, he was a member of Bill Black's Combo. Baugh's career was limited by financial problems and a dependence on alcohol and other drugs. He moved to Waco, Texas, and in 1970, formed a country band, the Midnite Cowboys, with guitarist Buddy Holobaugh.

Baugh died in Monterey, California, in 1999.
