= Hotel Edison =

Hotel in Manhattan, New York

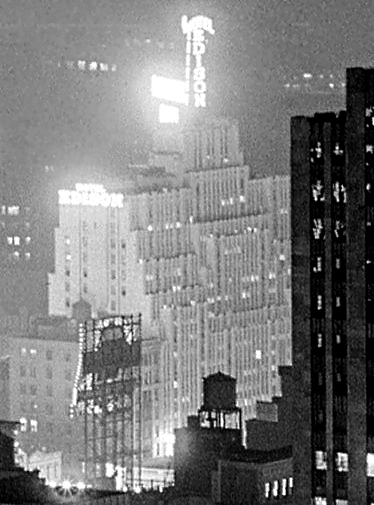
- The hotel as seen from 515 Madison Avenue, 1933
- Interactive map of the Hotel Edison area

General information
- Location: 228 West 47th Street, Manhattan, New York, United States
- Coordinates: 40.75968°N 73.98611°W
- Opened: 1931
- Owner: Shimmie Horn; Gerald Barad

Technical details
- Floor count: 26

Design and construction
- Architect: Herbert J. Krapp

Website
- Official website

Hotel Edison is at 228 West 47th Street in Midtown Manhattan, New York City. Opened in 1931, it is part of the Triumph Hotels brand, owned by Shimmie Horn and Gerald Barad. Thomas Edison turned on the lights when it opened. It accommodated 1,000 guests on 26 floors and offered three restaurants. It attempted to mimic the telephone number PEnnsylvania 6-5000 of the Hotel Pennsylvania by using the telephone exchange name CIrcle 6-5000. Herbert J. Krapp was the architect, and Milton J. Kramer was the original owner. The hotel's ballroom was used as the Broadway theatres Arena Theatre in 1950 and as the Edison Theatre from 1972 until 1991, when it was converted back into a ballroom. Another former ballroom was home to Frances Edelstein's Cafe Edison from 1980 to 2014.

In the early 1950s, "Glorious" Gloria Parker and her orchestra hosted an evening broadcast on WOR from the Hotel Edison. Parker would open the show with the glass harp (or musical glasses) and feature the popular Latin sound on her marimba with her orchestra.

Henry Jerome was a band leader at the hotel when he heard from Bill Randle about a trio. This led the signing of Dorsey Burnette, Johnny Burnette and Paul Burlison to a management contract. Jerome got Johnny a daytime job as an elevator operator at the hotel and moved The Rock and Roll Trio in the hotel from the YMCA. He secured a contract for the trio with GAC (General Artists Corporation) and with the Coral division of Decca Records.

The hallway walking scene preceding Luca Brasi's murder in the 1972 film The Godfather was filmed in the hotel. It was the penthouse in Woody Allen's 1994 film Bullets over Broadway. Neil Simon's 2001 play 45 Seconds from Broadway is set in the hotel's cafe. Michael Keaton is seen drinking at the hotel's bar, the Rum House, in the 2014 film Birdman.

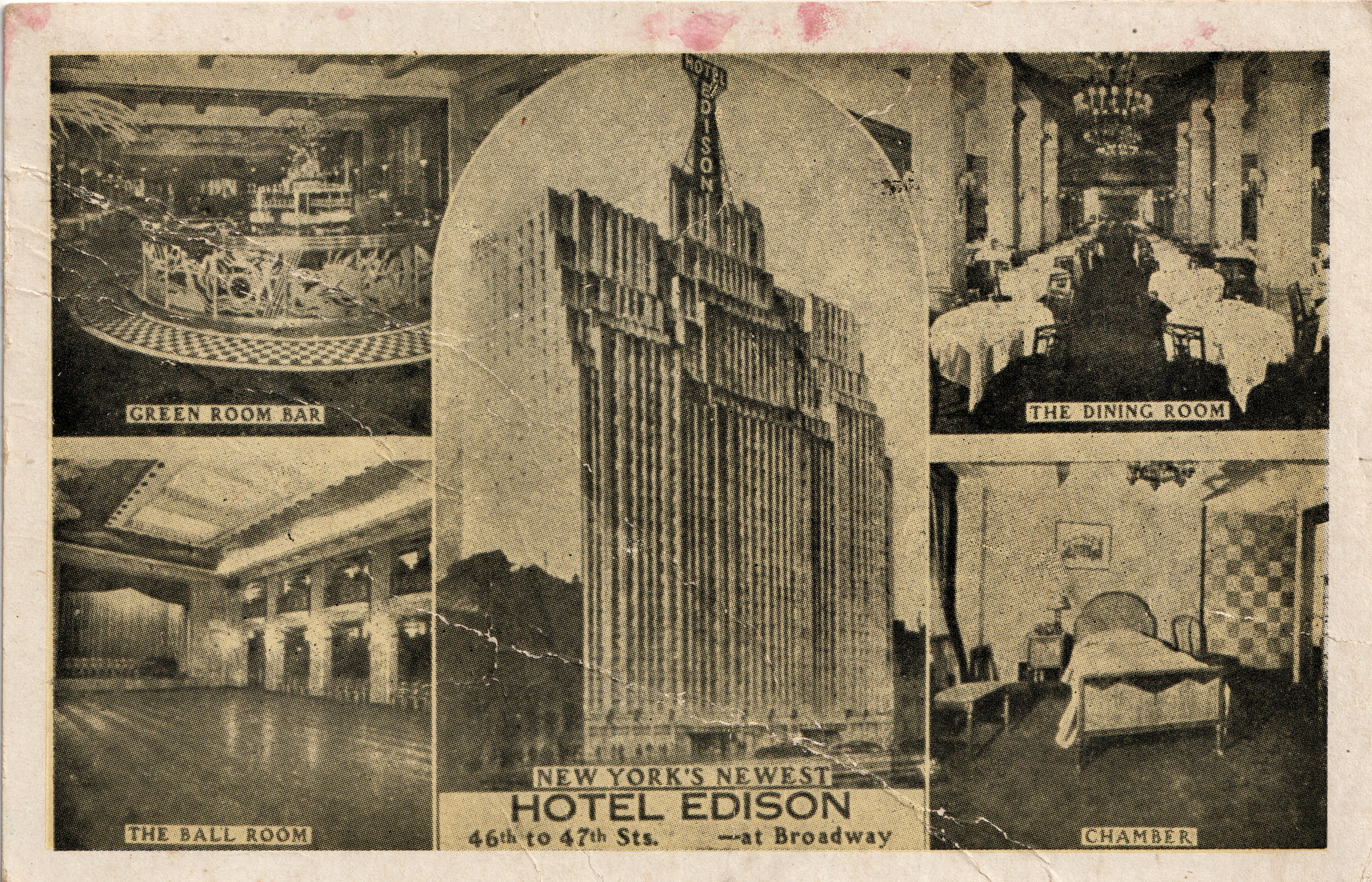
Hotel Edison Green Room bar, ball room, dining room, and chamber seen on a postcard circa 1930s or 40s
