= Freedom Records (disambiguation) =

Freedom Records may refer to:

- Freedom Records, a now-defunct jazz label owned by Arista Records
- Freedom (record label), a subsidiary of Liberty Records
- Freedom Records (Houston based label), an R&B label
