= Frances Edelstein =

Polish-born American businesswoman (1926–2018)

- Born: Frima Trost; April 18, 1926; Komorów, Poland
- Died: September 24, 2018 (aged 92); Manalapan Township, New Jersey
- Known for: Cook and co-owner at the Cafe Edison in New York City, 1980–2014
- Awards: Special Tony Award (2004), for contributions the Broadway community

Frances Edelstein (April 18, 1926 – September 24, 2018), born Frima Trost, was a Polish-born American businesswoman, owner (with her husband) of the Cafe Edison in New York City's Theater District from 1980 to 2014. She was a survivor of the Holocaust.

== Early life ==
Frima Trost was born in Komorów, Poland in 1926, the daughter of Hersz Trost and Chaja Trost. The Trosts were Jewish; her father was a butcher. Frima Trost learned traditional recipes from her mother. Most of the Trost family, except for Frima and her brother Moishe, were killed in the Holocaust. Frima and Moishe Trost escaped to the forest with their childhood friends, Harry Edelstein and his brother; the four orphaned youths slept in barns and hid from capture for five years. Harry and Frima (who took the name Frances) married in Warsaw in 1945, and moved to the United States in 1947, with their first child.

== Career ==
The Edelsteins settled in the Dorothy section of Weymouth Township, where they ran a chicken farm. They later moved to Brooklyn, where they used to run coffee and candy shops. In 1980, Frances and Harry Edelstein founded the Cafe Edison in the old ballroom of the Hotel Edison on West 47th Street. The menu featured matzo ball soup, blintzes, borscht, and latkes, and was popular with theatre professionals working on Broadway, looking for a hearty, inexpensive meal. It was jokingly called "the Polish Tea Room", in contrast with the more formal (and more expensive) Russian Tea Room restaurant. She was remembered as "a very, very short woman, firmly grounded on the earth," whose food and hospitality created a home away from home for a generation of showfolk and theatregoers. "The Edison felt like going to grandma's house," recalled actress Linda Lavin, a regular at the cafe. In a 1996 profile, journalist Lenore Skenazy noted that Edelstein "is to Cafe Edison what Carol Channing is to Hello, Dolly!"

Frances Edelstein was the inspiration for a Neil Simon character, Zelda in 45 Seconds from Broadway (2001), a role created on Broadway by Rebecca Schull. The Edelsteins were honored by the American Theatre Wing in 2004, with a special Tony Award for their contributions to the Broadway community. The Cafe Edison closed in 2014, despite a public protest and effort to save the restaurant.

== Personal life ==
Frances and Harry Edelstein had a son Scott, and a daughter, Harriet. She was widowed when Harry died in 2009, and she died in 2018, aged 92, at home in Manalapan Township, New Jersey.
