= Johnny Mann =

American conductor (1928–2014)

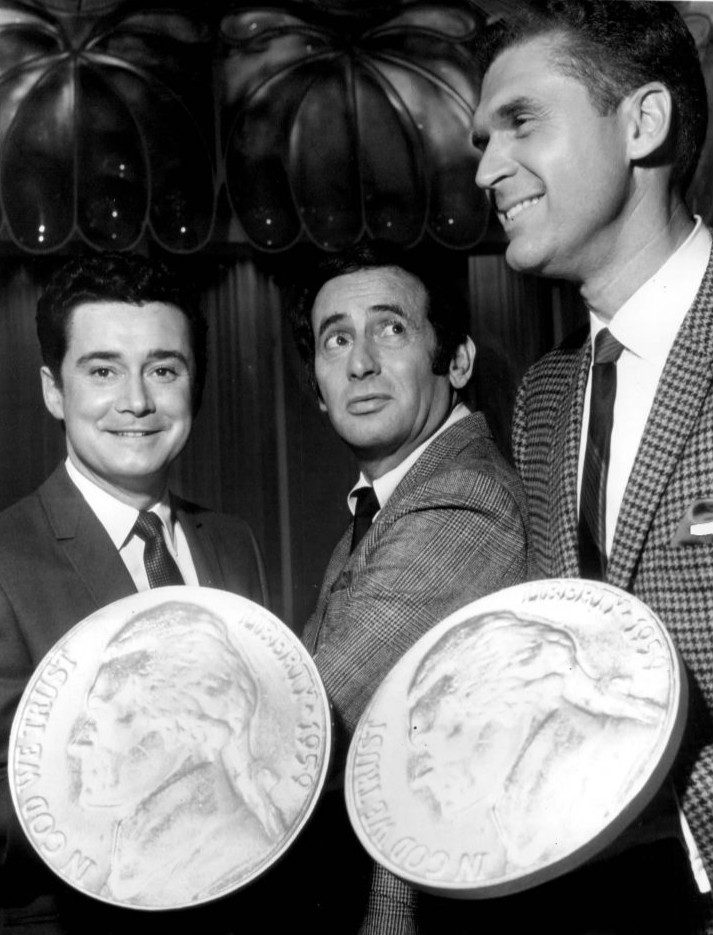
- Mann, at right, with Regis Philbin and Joey Bishop on The Joey Bishop Show (1969)
- Born: John Russell Mann; August 30, 1928; Baltimore, Maryland, U.S.
- Died: June 18, 2014 (aged 85); Anderson, South Carolina, U.S.
- Occupations: Arranger; composer; conductor; musician; singer
- Spouses: Lori Nelson (m. 1960; div. 1973) Lynn Marie Dolin (m. 1975; div. 1983) Betty Weinmann (m. 1983)
- Children: 2

John Russell Mann (August 30, 1928 – June 18, 2014) was an American arranger, composer, conductor, entertainer, singer, and recording artist.

== Career ==
Johnny Mann began his music career in the late 1940s in his hometown of Baltimore before serving in the army playing as a member of the U.S. Army Field Band from 1951 to 1953. After his honorable discharge, he moved to Los Angeles to continue his professional music career.

As bandleader of The Johnny Mann Singers, he and the group had done sound recording and reproduction for various guest singers and were the presentators of the TV series titled Stand Up and Cheer (1971–1974). In addition, Mann was the musical director for the 1967-69 ABC-TV late night talk show, The Joey Bishop Show, and had twice performed at the White House. He was also musical director of The Alvin Show and was the singing voice of the chipmunk named Theodore. Mann was also choral director for The NBC Comedy Hour. Mann was credited as "Johnnie Mann" in some of his earlier works. His group's most notable alumna was Vicki Lawrence.

The Johnny Mann Singers performed a strongly patriotic musical presentation at the 1972 Emmy Awards telecast hosted by Johnny Carson. Following their performance, Carson returned to the stage and declared "War Bonds are available in the lobby", a sarcastic comment on the group's flag-waving. The remark offended some conservative viewers around the country.

Mann wrote a number of radio jingles, the most famous being the "Sound of the City" jingle for KSFO in San Francisco, California. This jingle became as requested as many of the songs played by KSFO in the era of Don Sherwood. It was adapted by Mann for other radio stations around the country, which included KFRC (AM) in San Francisco and CKLW in Windsor, Ontario. Mann can be seen on YouTube videos at a Los Angeles recording studio directing his six-voice jingle singers while they sing jingles for radio station KRTH-FM (K-Earth 101).

In 1998, a Golden Palm Star on the Palm Springs, California, Walk of Stars was dedicated to him.

In 2005, Mann and his wife, Betty, retired to Anderson, South Carolina, but he continued to produce radio station jingles, guest conduct around the country, and participate in local musical programs.

In April 2014, at the age of 85, he was a guest conductor of The South Carolina School of the Arts at Anderson University's spring gala where he led the university choir in performing The Johnny Mann Singers arrangement of "Up, Up and Away". At the song's conclusion, the audience of about 1,000 stood in Mann's honor.

=== Recordings ===
The Johnny Mann Singers recorded 42 albums, mainly for Liberty Records, from the 1950s to the 1970s. In the mid-1970s, the Johnny Mann Singers began recording with Light Records.

In the early 1960s, the Singers provided backing for several vocalists, including rock 'n' roll and rockabilly singer Johnny Burnette (including "God, Country and My Baby") and pop singer Bobby Vee. The Singers were also involved with the Si Zentner Orchestra, The Crickets, and Eddie Cochran, who was also signed to Liberty Records in Hollywood.

The Johnny Mann Singers' instrumental "Cinnamint Shuffle (Mexican Shuffle)" "bubbled under" the Billboard Hot 100 chart in 1966, reaching number 126. Their next single, a cover version of "Up, Up and Away", became the hit version of the song on the UK Singles Chart, overtaking the US hit version by The 5th Dimension. The version also won a Grammy Award in 1968 in the Best Performance by a Choir of Seven or More Persons category. In total, Mann was nominated for five Grammys, two of which he won.

== Marriages and children ==
On December 10, 1960, Mann married actress Lori Nelson. They had two daughters, Susan Lori and Jennifer Lee, before divorcing in April 1973.

Mann married actress Lynn Marie Dolin on July 26, 1975. They occasionally appeared as a couple on the game show, Tattletales. They had no children together and divorced on August 3, 1983.

On August 20, 1983, Mann married Elizabeth Jane "Betty" Weinmann. They remained married for over 30 years, until Mann's death in 2014. He and Betty were members of St. John's United Methodist Church in Anderson, South Carolina, where they sang in the choir.

== Death ==
On June 18, 2014, Johnny Mann died of heart failure at age 85 at his home in Anderson, South Carolina.

On June 28, 2014, at his memorial service, Evans Whitaker, president of Anderson University, announced the creation of the Johnny Mann Center for Commercial Music at Anderson University in his memory.
