= Paul Burlison =

American rockabilly guitarist (1929–2003)

- Burlison performing at the 2002 Rockabilly Hall of Fame ceremony

Background information
- Born: February 4, 1929; Brownsville, Tennessee, U.S.
- Died: September 27, 2003 (aged 74) Horn Lake, Mississippi, U.S.
- Genres: Rockabilly, rock and roll
- Occupation: Musician
- Instrument: Guitar

Paul Burlison (February 4, 1929 – September 27, 2003) was an American rockabilly guitarist and a founding member of The Rock and Roll Trio.

Burlison was born in Brownsville, Tennessee, where he was exposed to music at an early age. After a stint in the United States Military, Burlison teamed up with Johnny and Dorsey Burnette to form The Rock and Roll Trio. The band released several singles, but failed to attain chart success. Paul is sometimes credited with being the first guitarist to intentionally record with a distorted electric guitar on the 1956 recordings, "Lonesome Train on a Lonesome Track" and "Honey Hush." The trio disbanded in the fall of 1957 and Burlison moved back to Tennessee to start a family. There he started his own electrical subcontracting business which he ran faithfully for twenty years, taking a break when the trio reunited in the early 1980s. He released his only solo album in 1997, which received positive reviews. Burlison remained active in the music scene until his death in 2003.

Burlison and his family lived in Brownsville until 1937. During the floods of that year, miserable economic conditions prompted the Burlison family to move to Memphis, Tennessee. In 1938, his brother-in-law, Earl Brooks began to teach him to play the guitar. As well as learning Brooks' Country influenced techniques, he also drew inspiration from watching Jesse Lee and Juanita Denson perform. Later, he would frequent the Blues joints along Beale Street. While he was still in high school, he would travel to the outskirts of West Memphis, Arkansas, to watch Chester Burnett ("Howlin' Wolf") play.

Burlison also developed an interest in boxing and began training at the Dave Wells Community Center under the instruction of trainer, Jim Denson. He was to win the local welterweight championship, and was runner-up in the All-Navy Tournament 1947-48. Whilst competing in the 1949 Golden Gloves tournament, Denson introduced him to another young boxer, Dorsey Burnette.

Dorsey Burnette would become a Golden Gloves welterweight champion. He had a younger brother, Johnny Burnette, who was a Golden Gloves lightweight champion fighter. Both brothers had a deep interest in music and it was through their mutual interest in both music and boxing that the three were to become close friends.

Toward the end of the World War II, Paul Burlison was enlisted in the United States Navy (1946). He was only 17 years of age at the time and received an honorable discharge in 1949.

== Formation of the trio ==
After his discharge, Burlison returned to Memphis, where he would subsequently begin a daytime job at Crown Electric Company as an electrician. Crown Electric would also employ Dorsey Burnette as a journeyman/electrician and a young man named Elvis Presley as a truck driver.

Burlison did not lose his interest in music and he began picking up blues session work at a pre-Elvis Sun Records, where he recorded with various black artists, most notably Howlin' Wolf. He also found work playing with Clyde Leoppard and the Snearly Ranch Boys and he was also heard on the radio with Don Paul. Later, he would join the Shelby Follin Band, with whom he would play until 1954. For a few months he and band-mate Smokey Joe Baugh also performed with Howlin' Wolf on radio KWEM in West Memphis, Arkansas.

The Rock and Roll Trio, from left to right, Paul Burlison, Johnny Burnette, and Dorsey Burnette.

Burlison began or renewed his friendship with the Burnette Brothers, depending upon which discharge date is correct. All three had an interest in music and in 1952 or 1953 they formed a group, which may have been called "The Rhythm Rangers" at that time. Johnny Burnette sang the vocals and played acoustic guitar, Dorsey Burnette played bass and Burlison played lead guitar. It was during the early fifties that the group would play in and around Memphis at the local honkytonks. These were the days of the jitterbug and bop, and to keep the honkytonk managers happy without the big band, and to keep the patrons on the dance floor, the group would play an upbeat version of blues and country called rockabilly. In 1956, the three young men moved to New York City, where they managed to get a contract with Coral Records and record their rockabilly music under the name The Rock and Roll Trio.

The trio had five recording sessions between May and July 1956; two single records were released, one in June and the other in July 1956. Despite promotional appearances on Dick Clark's American Bandstand, Steve Allen's Tonight Show and Perry Como's Kraft Music Hall, these singles failed to make the charts. The trio then went on a summer tour with Carl Perkins and Gene Vincent, picking up a drummer, Tony Austin, who was a cousin of Carl Perkins on the way. On September 9, 1956, they appeared in the final of the Ted Mack Original Amateur Hour at Madison Square Garden. A third single was released in October 1956, but it failed to chart.

In the fall of 1956, at a gig at Niagara Falls a fight broke out and Dorsey Burnette quit the group. He was rapidly replaced by Johnny Black, the brother of Elvis's bassist Bill Black. The revised line-up appeared in Alan Freed's movie Rock, Rock, Rock, where they mimed to "Lonesome Train (On A Lonesome Track)". This was released as a single in January 1957, but it failed to produce any chart success.

== Brief hiatus ==
After a brief trip to California to join the Burnette Brothers, Burlison returned to Memphis and retired from the music business to start a family. In 1960, he also started his own electrical subcontracting company, "Safety Electrical" devoting his time and energy to his business and to his family for the next twenty years. His company was successful and in subsequent years, he also operated a mail-order business specializing in rare recordings.

The Burnette brothers moved to California and continued to have sporadic success in the music industry until the end of the decade. In 1960, Johnny Burnette had two major hits as a solo artist with "Dreamin'" and "You're Sixteen," and Dorsey Burnette had Top 30 and Top 50 hits, again as a solo artist, with "Tall Oak Tree" and "Hey Little One".

After "Dreamin'" had become a hit, Johnny Burnette offered Burlison a spot in his road band, but Burlison rejected this idea. By 1963, Johnny's career was in a decline and in an effort to revive it, he wanted to reprise some of the old material. So Burlison joined Johnny on a short swing through the Mid South after his regular guitarist broke two of his fingers. They even planned to go to England together, but Burlison fell ill and he went back to Memphis and his contracting business.

== Rock and roll revival ==
Paul Burlison returned to the music scene in the 1980s, first with Johnny Black and Tony Austin in a recreation of the trio. He also launched his own Rock-A-Billy record label to release Johnny Burnette's Rock and Roll Trio and Their Rockin' Friends from Memphis, an all-star tribute to the memories of Johnny and Dorsey Burnette featuring local legends like Eddie Bond, Jim Dickinson and Charlie Feathers.

In 1986, Burlison joined the Sun Rhythm Section, an oldies group, which included amongst others D J Fontana, Elvis's former drummer. In 1990, he signed on with Rocky Burnette's rockabilly revival band.

== Solo album ==
In 1997, Burlison cut his first ever solo album Train Kept A-Rollin' on Sweetfish Records as a tribute to the Rock and Roll Trio. The album contained eleven tracks, three of which, "Train Kept A-Rollin'", "Lonesome Tears in My Eyes", and "Lonesome Train (on a Lonesome Track)", had been featured on the Rock and Roll Trio's original 1956 album. The album featured such guest artists as Rocky Burnette (Johnny's son), Billy Burnette (Dorsey's son) of Fleetwood Mac, Rick Danko and Levon Helm of The Band, David Hidalgo, Cesar Rosas, and Conrad Lozano of Los Lobos, Mavis Staples of The Staple Singers, and Kim Wilson of The Fabulous Thunderbirds.

== Death and legacy ==
Burlison died on September 27, 2003, in Horn Lake, Mississippi, after a long battle with colon cancer. He was interred in Hinds Chapel Cemetery, Lake Cormorant, Mississippi. Rocky and Billy Burnette helped eulogize their fathers' bandmate at the funeral.

Many guitarists have claimed to have been influenced by Paul Burlison. These include Jimmy Page, Jeff Beck and Eric Clapton. Additionally, The Beatles, The Yardbirds, Led Zeppelin and Aerosmith have played cover versions of The Rock and Roll Trio's hits, often with special emphasis on Burlison's guitar riffs. Poison Ivy of the rockabilly punk band The Cramps was influenced by his style, covering his track,"Tear it Up", whilst Rockabilly garage band Tav Falco's Panther Burns played his song "You're Undecided". Lemmy of Motörhead also played "Train Kept A-Rollin'".

Burlison was also a mentor to the rockabilly band, The Dempseys (Brad Birkedahl, "Slick" Joe Fick and Ron Perrone Jr). The Dempseys have had modest success around the world for their rockabilly style, honed around Memphis and alongside a willing mentor in Burlison. They also played Elvis Presley's band in the Oscar-winning film Walk the Line. Burlison played on their first album, a cassette album recorded at Sam Phillips' Studios in Memphis, TN. He also was pictured on their first CD album, Drinking Songs for Your Grandparents and provided an introductory track, playing on a few more. That cover also pictured Cordell Jackson.

Burlison's pioneering contribution to rock-and-roll has been recognized by the Rockabilly Hall of Fame.

== Biography ==
- Official Paul Burlison Homepage - For general information including boxing, early years and later years
- https://web.archive.org/web/20091020192744/http://geocities.com/SunsetStrip/Arena/6527/PaulBurlison.htm
- Paul Burlison by Howard A Dewitt. - Early years, Rock and Roll Trio, US Navy/1949 discharge date.
- http://www.rockabillyhall.com/PaulBurlison.html
- Paul Burlison by Jason Ankeny - For general information, personnel changes in The Rock and Roll Trio, US Army/1951 discharge date, later years.
- Dorsey Burnette by Bruce Eder – For 1951 induction date into the US Army.
- Paul Burlison, Train Kept A-Rollin' by The Black Cat for details of 1997 LP "The Train Kept A-Rollin.
- http://www.rockabilly.nl/artists/index.htm
- Paul Burlison: Train Kept A Rollin' -- extracted from Guitar Shop, 1997 – For details of Paul Burlison - Train Kept A Rollin' - 1997 - Sweetfish Records
- https://web.archive.org/web/20051125021601/http://theband.hiof.no/albums/train_kept_a_rollin.html
- Johnny Burnette's Rock 'n' Roll Trio – For early years, 1963 tour with Johnny Burnette and service in US Navy. No discharge date given but the wording implies 1949.
- http://www.history-of-rock.com/burnettes.htm
- Rock Billy Boogie/Johnny Burnette Trio by Colin Escott (Sleeve notes to Bear Family CD BCD 15474. AH) - For details of Johnny Black, Tony Austin, 1963 tour with Johnny Burnette and 1951 discharge date from US Armed Forces
- The Johnny & Dorsey Burnette Discography website by Gilles Vignal and Marc Alesina – For the name Rhythm Rangers
- http://www.burnettebrothers.user.fr
- Johnny and Dorsey/The Burnette Brothers by Adam Komorowski (Sleeve Notes to Rockstar CD RSRCD 005) – For Paul Burlison's 1957/1958 trip to California.
