= Dorsey Burnette =

American musician (1932–1979)

- Born: Dorsey William Burnett Jr. December 28, 1932; Memphis, Tennessee, U.S.
- Died: August 19, 1979 (aged 46); Canoga Park, California, U.S.
- Relatives: Billy Burnette (son); Johnny Burnette (brother); Rocky Burnette (nephew)
- Musical career
- Origin: Memphis, Tennessee, U.S.
- Genres: Rockabilly, country, rock and roll
- Occupations: Singer, composer
- Instruments: Vocals, Double bass, Acoustic guitar
- Labels: Capitol; Motown; Coral; Dot; Era; Imperial; Reprise; Smash

Dorsey William Burnett Jr. (December 28, 1932 – August 19, 1979) was an American early rockabilly singer. With his younger brother Johnny Burnette and a friend named Paul Burlison, he was a founding member of The Rock and Roll Trio. He is also the father of country musician and former Fleetwood Mac member Billy Burnette.

== Background and early career ==
Dorsey William Burnett Jr. was born on December 28, 1932, to Willie Mae and Dorsey William Burnett Sr. in Memphis, Tennessee, United States. The 'e' at the end of his surname was added later. His younger brother, John Joseph "Johnny" Burnett, was born on March 25, 1934. The family lived in a public housing project in the Lauderdale Courts area of Memphis, Tennessee.

Dorsey was a competent athlete with an interest in boxing. Both of the Burnette brothers turned out to be successful amateur boxers, becoming local Golden Gloves champions. In 1949, Dorsey was introduced to another young boxing contender named Paul Burlison by Jimmy Denson, his boxing teacher, and they were to become friends. Later, Burlison was introduced to Johnny Burnette, and they also became friends. All three men had a mutual interest in music. Burlison had begun to receive guitar lessons when he was eight years old. In 1939, Dorsey Sr. gave his two sons a pair of Gene Autry guitars. According to most sources, the brothers immediately broke them over each other's head. Dorsey Sr. then bought them two more guitars. Dorsey later recalled that their father had said "Learn to play those guitars. You can be like those folks on the Grand Ole Opry if you want to." Dorsey said that "he learned the G, C and E chords and when the strings broke, he would use baling wire".

After graduating from a Catholic high school in Memphis, Dorsey became a professional boxer before working at a number of daytime jobs, which included a cotton picker, an oiler on a Mississippi riverboat, a fisherman, a carpet layer. He was finally to work at the Crown Electric Company with Paul Burlison as an apprentice electrician and would spend six years studying for an electrician's license. Johnny Burnette also worked as a deck hand on barges, which traversed the Mississippi River and though they worked separately, each of them would bring his guitar on board and write songs during his spare time. After work, they would perform those and other songs together at local bars with a varying array of sidemen. Paul Burlison joined them after his discharge from the United States Armed Forces, and in 1952 or 1953, they formed a group, which may have been called The Rhythm Rangers at the time. Johnny Burnette sang the vocals and played acoustic guitar, Dorsey played bass, and Paul Burlison played lead guitar.

== The Rock and Roll Trio ==
For economic reasons, in 1956, the three young men moved to New York City, where they got an audition with Ted Mack on The Original Amateur Hour. They won the competition three times in a row, which gained them a place in the finals and a recording contract with Coral Records and they officially became The Rock and Roll Trio.

== Move to California ==
Colin Escott of Showtime Magazine states that during or after his stint with his own trio, Dorsey recorded a demo session with Fabor Robinson (owner of Fabor Records, co-owner of Abbott Records and sometime manager of Johnny Horton and Jim Reeves). French researchers Giles Vignal and Marc Alesina place the demo session at the Sun Records Studio in November 1956, and they have Dorsey's being backed by Johnny Burnette and Paul Burlison. "Let's Fall in Love" and four other tracks were cut, but all are believed to be lost. On November 24, 1956, Dorsey went to a session at the Fabor Studio in Malibu, California, where he cut four tracks: "The Devil Queen", "Let's Fall in Love", "At a Distance" and "Jungle Magic". These tracks were released as two singles: "Let's Fall in Love/The Devil's Queen" (Abbott 188–45) on November 24, 1956, and "Jungle Magic/At a Distance" (Abbott 190–45) on February 23, 1957. Fabor Robinson offered to place Dorsey on either the Louisiana Hayride or the Town Hall Party (the West Coast's leading showcase for country music).

== The Burnette Brothers ==
The songwriting credits show John Marascalco as the writer of "Bertha Lou", but Cub Koda reports Brooks as saying that the song was in fact written by Johnny Burnette, who, as part of the recording deal, sold it to Marascalco. John Marascalco later was persuaded to release Dorsey's version, which he still owned. In 1965, "Bertha Lou"/"Keep a Knockin’" was released as Cee-Jam No. 6 with "Bertha Lou" under the name of Dorsey Burnette. The flipside "Keep a Knockin’" was released under the name The Brothers. In 1966, "Bertha Lou"/"’Til The Law Says Stop" was released as Cee-Jam No. 16 with both sides under the name Dorsey Burnette.

It was sheer bravado that enabled the Burnette Brothers to have their first major breakthrough as songwriters. On arriving in Los Angeles, Joe Campbell bought a copy of "A Map to the Stars", which showed the location of teen idol Ricky Nelson's home. In an effort to get their songs to him, the Burnettes and Campbell sat on the steps of the star's home until they could get a meeting with him. This persistence worked, and Nelson was impressed with their work, and he recorded "Believe What You Say", "It's Late" and "Waitin' in School". Other artists on Imperial Records, Nelson's label, such as Roy Brown, who covered the brothers' "Hip Shakin' Baby", benefited from their songwriting abilities, and this led to their signing a recording contract with Imperial.

== Solo career ==
=== Pop years ===
Dorsey Burnette had two single releases while contracted to Imperial Records as a solo artist: "You Came as a Miracle"/"Try" (Imperial X5561), released on March 9, 1959, and "Lonely Train"/"Misery" (Imperial X 5597), released on September 7, 1959. Neither record was a hit. In late 1959, Dorsey offered "Tall Oak Tree" to Ricky Nelson, who turned it down. Now signed to Era Records, Dorsey recorded the song himself, and it was released on January 11, 1960, backed with "Juarez Town" (Era 3012). The record entered the charts and reached No. 23 on the Hot 100. He was the first of the Burnette Brothers to have a hit record. This success spurred Coral Records to dig into their archives and release two old Rock and Roll Trio recordings as "Blues Stay Away from Me"/"Midnight Train" (Coral 9–62190). The top side was released under the name Dorsey Burnette, but the flip side was under the names Dorsey and Johnny Burnette. It did not make the charts. On May 2, 1960, Era released a follow-up record, "Hey Little One"/"Big Rock Candy Mountain" (Era 3019), by Dorsey and it reached No. 48 in the Hot 100.

Dorsey had three singles released during his time with Dot Records. The first was "Rainin'"/"A Full House" (Dot 45–16230), released May 1961; followed by "Feminine Touch"/"Sad Boy" (Dot 45–16265), released September 25, 1961; and finally "Dying Ember"/"A Country Boy in the Army" (Dot 45–16305) released January 1962. None of these releases caught the public's ear, and he was released at the end of his six-month contract. From here, he moved to Reprise Records, the label owned at that time by Frank Sinatra. At Reprise, Dorsey worked with producer Jimmy Bowen and arranger Jack Nitzsche and had two single releases in 1962. "Castle in the Sky"/"The Boys Kept Hangin' Around" (Reprise R-20,093) was released on June 30, 1962, and "I'm Waitin' for Ya Baby"/"Darling Jane" (Reprise R-20,121) was released October 27, 1962. Neither single was a hit. During 1963, he had four singles releases on Reprise. The first was "Foolish Pride"/"Four For Texas" (Reprise R-20,146) released February 23, 1963; followed by "Hey Sue"/"It Don't Take Much" (Reprise R-20,153), released March 9, 1963; then "Invisible Chains/Pebbles" (Reprise R-20,177), released May 9, 1963. His final release was "Where's the Lonely Girl?"/"One of the Lonely" (Reprise R-20,208) released August 24, 1963. To coincide with this single, Imperial released "Circle Rock"/"House with a Tin Roof Top" (Imperial 5987) in August 1963. None of these singles reached the charts, and so he moved to the Mel-O-Dy label, a subsidiary of Motown Records. The label's early releases were soul-oriented and included tracks by Lamont Dozier, The Vells (Martha and the Vandellas) and The Pirates (The Temptations).

The single "The Greatest Love"/"Thin Little, Simple Little, Plain Little Girl" (Liberty 56087) was released in late 1968 and was in "hitbound" status on some radio stations as of December 25, 1968.

=== Johnny Burnette's death ===
Three months later Dorsey Burnette suffered a family tragedy from which, according to most sources, he never fully recovered. On August 14, 1964, his brother Johnny had gone on a fishing trip on Clear Lake, California. After dark, his tiny, unlit fishing boat was struck by an unaware cabin cruiser, and the impact threw him into the lake where he drowned. Dorsey was distraught, and he telephoned Paul Burlison, who immediately flew to comfort him. The two men renewed their friendship, and Johnny Burnette was interred in Forest Lawn Memorial Park in Glendale, California. His last two Mel-O-Dy singles, "Jimmy Brown"/"Everybody's Angel" (Mel-O-Dy 116) released October 1964 and "Long Long Time Ago"/"Ever Since the World Began" (Mel-O-Dy 118), released in November 1964, failed to make the charts. The label was discontinued in April 1965, and from then on, Dorsey recorded without luck on a series of labels, including Liberty, Merri, Happy Tiger, Music Factory, Smash (where he re-recorded "Tall Oak Tree"), Mercury, Hickory and Condor, which released "The Magnificent Sanctuary Band"/"Can't You See It Happening" (Condor FF-1005) on February 7, 1970.

=== Country years ===
By the 1970s Dorsey had become a born-again Christian and had returned to country material. He found success on the country charts with self-penned songs such as "In the Spring (The Roses Always Turn Red)" (Capitol 3307; 1972; No. 21), "I Just Couldn't Let Her Walk Away" (Capitol 3404; 1972; No. 40), "Darlin’" (Capitol 3678; 1973; No. 26), "Molly (I Ain't Getting' Any Younger)" (Melodyland 6007: 1975; No. 28) and "Things I Treasure" (Calliope 8004; 1977; No. 31). He was voted Most Promising Male Vocalist by the Academy of Country Music in 1974, and in all, he had 15 country hits, but none made the top 20.

=== Films ===
During the 1970s, Dorsey turned to the big screen. In 1974, he was credited with writing the songs for the film Bootleggers (also known as Bootleggers Angel). In 1976, he helped compose the music, with Mike Curb and Duane Eddy, for Dixie Dynamite. In 1977, he was credited as the composer of the original music for the soundtrack of the horror movie Kingdom of the Spiders. In 1978, he was credited with singing the title song of the movie My Boys Are Good Boys as well as co-writing the song in collaboration with Doug Goodwin.

== Death ==
In 1979, he signed with Elektra/Asylum label. Just after his first record release, however, he died of a massive heart attack at his home in Canoga Park, California, on August 19, 1979, aged 46. He is interred at Forest Lawn Memorial Park Cemetery in Glendale, California.

== Final public performance ==
Dorsey last appeared in public on August 18, 1979 (the day before he died), at The Performing Arts Center in Oxnard, California. He played a half-hour show at a benefit for the Arthritis Foundation.

Patrick Landreville, who played the final show with Dorsey, stated:

Most people that play benefits for national or international charities get paid for their performances, at the least their expenses are paid. But Dorsey and I choose to play for free at these affairs, though neither one of us is well off financially. Dorsey is a legendary figure in music and could command a hefty sum for his services but he's chosen to give, not to take. I'm proud to know him and to have had the opportunity to make music with him and I'm especially proud that he considers me his peer.

== Legacy ==
After his death, singer and friend Delaney Bramlett organized a benefit concert for Dorsey Burnette's widow at The Forum in Inglewood, California, where Kris Kristofferson, Hoyt Axton, Tanya Tucker, Glen Campbell, Edward James Olmos, Duane Eddy, Delaney & Bonnie, Gary Busey, Maureen McGovern and Roger Miller appeared. Burnette's pioneering contribution to the genre has been recognized by the Rockabilly Hall of Fame.

== Discography ==
=== Albums ===
Year	Album	US Country	Label
1960	Tall Oak Tree	—	Era
1963	Dorsey Burnette Sings	—	Dot
1963	Country Sound, City Sound	—	Canadian Point
1969	Dorsey Burnette's Greatest Hits	—	Era
1972	Here & Now	37	Capitol
1973	Dorsey Burnette	41	Capitol
1974	Comin' Back	—	Trip
1976	Dorsey	—	Buckboard
1977	This Is Dorsey Burnette	—	MC
1977	Things I Treasure	—	Calliope
1979	Tall Oak Tree	—	Koala
1979	Golden Hits of Dorsey Burnette	—	Gusto

=== Singles ===
Year	Single	Chart Positions				Album
Year	Single	US Country	US	CAN Country	CAN	Album
1960	"(There Was a) Tall Oak Tree"	—	23	—	—	Tall Oak Tree
1960	"Hey Little One"	—	48	—	—	Tall Oak Tree
1960	"Big Rock Candy Mountain"	—	102	—	—	Tall Oak Tree
1960	"The Ghost of Billy Malloo"	—	103	—	—	single only
1961	"Feminine Touch"	—	117	—	—	Dorsey Burnette Sings
1962	"I'm A Waitin' For Ya Baby"	—	—	—	—	single only
1962	"Darling Jane"	—	—	—	—	single only
1969	"The Greatest Love"	—	67	—	57	single only
1972	"In the Spring (The Roses Always Turn Red)"	21	—	—	—	Here & Now
1972	"I Just Couldn't Let Her Walk Away"	40	—	—	—	Here & Now
1972	"Lonely to Be Alone"	—	—	—	—	Here & Now
1973	"I Let Another Good One Get Away"	42	—	—	—	Dorsey Burnette
1973	"Keep Out of My Dreams"	53	—	—	—	Dorsey Burnette
1973	"Darlin' (Don't Come Back)" (with Sound Company)	26	—	31	—	Dorsey Burnette
1974	"It Happens Every Time" (with Sound Company)	85	—	—	—	Dorsey Burnette
1974	"Bob, All the Playboys and Me" (with Sound Company)	69	—	—	—	singles only
1974	"Daddy Loves You Honey"	62	—	—	—	singles only
1974	"What Ladies Can Do (When They Want To)"	71	—	—	—	singles only
1975	"Molly (I Ain't Gettin' Any Younger)"	28	—	36	—	singles only
1975	"Lyin' in Her Arms Again"	97	—	—	—	singles only
1976	"Ain't No Heartbreak"	74	—	45	—	singles only
1977	"Things I Treasure"	31	—	—	—	Things I Treasure
1977	"Soon as I Touched Her"	53	—	—	—	Things I Treasure
1979	"Here I Go Again"	77	—	—	—	singles only
1980	"B.J. Kick-a-Beaux"	—	—	—	—	singles only
