= Stand Up and Cheer (TV program) =

- Also known as: Johnny Mann's Stand Up and Cheer
- Genre: Variety
- Presented by: Johnny Mann
- Country of origin: United States
- Original language: English
- No. of seasons: 3
- No. of episodes: 48

Production
- Executive producer: Pierre Cossette
- Producers: Burt Sugarman; Dean Whitmore
- Running time: 22–24 minutes

Original release
- Network: Syndication
- Release: September 13, 1971 – January 28, 1974

Stand Up and Cheer (also known as Johnny Mann's Stand Up and Cheer) is an American variety show that aired in syndication for three consecutive seasons (sponsored nationally by Chevrolet), beginning in 1971, hosted by Johnny Mann, with many musical numbers sung by "The Johnny Mann Singers".

Although the program occasionally featured comedy skits, most of the segments in the half-hour show involved patriotic musicals, singing, or dancing.
