= 45 Seconds from Broadway =

2001 comedy play

45 Seconds from Broadway is a comedy play by Neil Simon, his thirty-third. The play premiered on Broadway in 2001.

== Production ==
The play opened on Broadway at the Richard Rodgers Theatre on November 11, 2001 and closed on January 13, 2002 after 73 performances and 31 previews, making it one of Simon's least successful efforts.

The play was directed by Jerry Zaks, and the opening cast included Lewis J. Stadlen as Mickey Fox, Rebecca Schull as Zelda, Louis Zorich as Bernie, David Margulies, and Marian Seldes as the wealthy theatergoer. The roles of Zelda and Bernie are based on the real-life owners of the Edison Cafe, Frances Edelstein and Harry Edelstein.

Joan Copeland was originally slated to play the role of Zelda, and Carol Woods was cast as Bessie James. Both Copeland and Woods left the production during rehearsals (and were replaced by Rebecca Schull and Lynda Gravátt, respectively). Neither Copeland nor Woods actually performed in this production.

== Plot overview ==
The title refers to the amount of time it takes to walk to Broadway from the play's setting (and reminiscent of George M. Cohan's 1906 play Forty-five Minutes from Broadway, 1906), a coffee shop inspired by one located off the lobby of the Hotel Edison in Midtown Manhattan, a long-time diner for "theatre types...prized for its casual atmosphere, inexpensive prices and matzoh ball soup".

Jackie Mason-like comedian Mickey Fox is surrounded by an eclectic cast of characters, including the dining spot's proprietor and his wife, an upscale society dame (in search of an intricately double-brewed cup of tea served in fine china on white linen) and her nearly mute husband, a British impresario, a Broadway ingénue, and a South African playwright. Simon's typical one-liners fly fast and furiously throughout the comic first act; his play takes a more serious turn worthy of an Arthur Miller drama in act 2 when Mickey's older brother pleads with him to help his son become the comedian he desperately wants to be.

== Reception ==
The talkinbroadway.com reviewer noted:

it is Marian Seldes and Bill Moor, as the bizarre patrons Rayleen and Charles that walk away with the show's biggest laughs and warmest moments. Moor is superb in his ability to make only a few words – or no words at all – go a very long way. Seldes, in contrast, speaks every one of her lines with gleeful, daffy relish. Her wardrobe (William Ivey Long's best costume work in the show), including her jaw-droppingly gaudy fur coat, is outrageous, but Seldes makes it work splendidly for Rayleen. Whether asking for linen tablecloths, the most complicated tea brewing imaginable, or items you'd never expect to find on the menu, Seldes makes her compellingly lovable and impossible to resist. Seldes is the essence of dramatic and comedic perfection.
