= God, Country and My Baby =

Single by Johnny Burnette

from the album Johnny Burnette's Hits and Other Favorites
- B-side: "Honestly I Do"
- Released: October 2, 1961
- Genre: Pop
- Length: 2:10
- Label: Liberty Records 55379
- Songwriter(s): John Dolan, Chico Holiday
- Producer(s): Snuff Garrett

Johnny Burnette singles chronology
"Fools Like Me" (1961)	"God, Country and My Baby" (1961)	"Clown Shoes" (1962)

"God, Country and My Baby" is a song written by John Dolan and Chico Holiday. It was originally released by Holiday on the New Phoenix label in September 1961.

== Johnny Burnette recording ==
Johnny Burnette recorded the song soon after the original, in October 1961. Burnette's version reached #18 on the Billboard Hot 100 in 1961. The song appeared on his 1962 album, Johnny Burnette's Hits and Other Favorites. The song was produced by Snuff Garrett. The Johnny Mann Singers are featured on the song.
