= Stan Kesler =

American musician (1928–2020)

- Born: Stanley Augustus Kesler; August 11, 1928; Abbeville, Mississippi, U.S.
- Died: October 26, 2020 (aged 92) Murfreesboro, Tennessee, U.S.
- Genres: Rock and roll, country, pop, R&B
- Occupations: Musician, songwriter, recording engineer, record producer
- Instruments: Steel guitar, guitar, mandolin, bass guitar
- Years active: 1946–c.2020

Stanley Augustus Kesler (August 11, 1928 – October 26, 2020) was an American musician, record producer and songwriter, whose career began at the Sun Studio in Memphis, Tennessee. He co-wrote several of Elvis Presley's early recordings including "I'm Left, You're Right, She's Gone" and "I Forgot to Remember to Forget", and played guitar and bass on hit records by Carl Perkins and Jerry Lee Lewis. As a producer, his successful records included "Wooly Bully" by Sam the Sham and the Pharaohs.

== Early life ==
Kesler was born in Abbeville, Mississippi. He learned to play mandolin and guitar as a child, and steel guitar during his time in the United States Marine Corps.

== Career ==
After his discharge, he formed a band with his brothers, before joining Al Rodgers in his band, performing in and around Amarillo, Texas. After two years with Rodgers, Kesler moved around 1950 to Memphis, where he played in various country and Western swing bands, including the Snearly Ranch Boys led by Clyde Leoppard, who also included Quinton Claunch. Kesler began writing songs for the band to record, and several were taken up by other singers at the Sun studios headed by Sam Phillips. These included Warren Smith, and Elvis Presley, who recorded "I'm Left, You're Right, She's Gone" in 1954, and "I Forgot to Remember to Forget" the following year. Presley's recording of "I'm Left, You're Right, She's Gone", written by Kesler with William E. (Bill) Taylor, was released as a single by Sun Records and reached #5 on the country chart; his version of "I Forgot to Remember to Forget", written by Kesler with Charlie Feathers, reached #1 on the country chart in early 1956.

By 1955, Kesler had also become a regular session musician at Sun, playing with the house band on records by Carl Perkins and others before switching to bass, which he played on Jerry Lee Lewis' 1957 hit "Great Balls of Fire", and records by Roy Orbison. He also worked as a recording engineer at the Sun Studio. In the late 1950s, he founded his own record label, Crystal, later starting two more labels, Penn and XL. In the mid-1960s, he found success with XL, producing "Wooly Bully" and several subsequent hits by Sam the Sham and the Pharaohs. He also worked as a producer with blues musician Willie Cobbs, recording the original version of "You Don't Love Me".

Kesler also engineered recording sessions for Quinton Claunch's Goldwax label, working with soul singer James Carr among others, and in that capacity put together a band of session musicians who included guitarist Reggie Young, drummer Gene Chrisman, keyboardist Bobby Emmons, and bassist Tommy Cogbill. After achieving initial success with Kesler at Goldwax, the band was persuaded to leave to join Chips Moman's new American Sound Studio in Nashville, where they had greater success becoming known as the "Memphis Boys". Kesler then put together a new recording group at the Sounds of Memphis Studio, including guitarist Charlie Freeman, bassist Tommy McClure, keyboardist Jim Dickinson, and drummer Sammy Creason, until they in turn were lured away to Miami where they recorded with Aretha Franklin and others for Atlantic Records, becoming the "Dixie Flyers".

Kesler eventually gave up the idea of independent production and in 1978 returned to work at the Sun Studio as an engineer. He later formed a touring group, the Sun Rhythm Section, with guitarists Paul Burlison and Sonny Burgess, drummer D. J. Fontana, keyboardist Jerry Lee "Smoochie" Smith of the Mar-Keys, and other musicians. The band toured internationally, and recorded an album on Flying Fish Records, Old Time Rock 'n Roll, in 1987.

== Personal life ==
He retired from the music industry in the early 1990s, and lived in Bartlett, Tennessee. He died on October 26, 2020, in Murfreesboro, Tennessee, from bone cancer.
