= Dreamin' (Johnny Burnette song) =

1960 song performed by Johnny Burnette

Single by Johnny Burnette

from the album Dreamin'
- B-side: "Cincinnati Fireball"
- Released: May 30, 1960
- Genre: Rockabilly
- Length: 2:37
- Label: Liberty 55258
- Songwriters: Barry De Vorzon, Ted Ellis
- Producer: Snuff Garrett

Johnny Burnette singles chronology
"Patrick Henry" (1960)	"Dreamin'" (1960)	"You're Sixteen" (1960)

"Dreamin'" is a song written by Barry De Vorzon and Ted Ellis and performed by Johnny Burnette. The song appeared on his 1960 album, Dreamin, and was produced by Snuff Garrett.

== Background ==
The personnel on the original recording included Howard Roberts and Vincent Terri on guitar, and Jerry Allison on drums.

== Chart performance ==
The song reached #5 on the UK Singles Chart and #11 on the Billboard Hot 100 in 1960. The song was ranked #86 on Billboard magazine's Top Hot 100 songs of 1960.

== Ronnie Williams version ==
"Dreamin'"

Single by Ronnie Williams
- A-side: "Dreamin'"
- B-side: "Ain't No Sin to Lie"
- Released: 1974
- Length: 3:39
- Label: Roxbury Records
- Composers: (Barry DeVorzon & Ted Ellis)
- Producer: Tony Camillo RB 2004

US singles chronology
"Dreamin'" (1974)	"Mr. Me, Mrs. You" (1975)

US soul singer Ronnie Williams had some chart success with his version in 1975.

=== Background ===
US soul singer Ronnie Williams recorded a version which was produced by Tony Camillo. The up-tempo version was released on the Roxbury Records label in November 1974. It was backed with "Ain't No Sin to Lie".

It was released in the Netherlands on Chelsea 2005 018.

=== Reception ===
According to the 8 November 1974 issue of Radio & Records, the world was to " Watch for this one!!!!.

It was reviewed in the 4 February 1975 issue of Blues & Soul. The reviewer was speculating that this might have been the same song Johnny Burnette had back in their youth days but was unrecognizable from the original and sounded brand new. The heavy disco sound was said to have it off to a good start. It was called a winner.

It was reviewed by John Peel in the 8 February 1975 issue of Sounds. It was given four stars by Peel. He said it had a full sound and fine singing, and it should appeal to Northern and Southern Soul disciples. He finished off with "It's a pleasure doing business with this one".

=== Airplay ===
As per the 8 November 1974 issue of Radio & Records, it was a key add on at R&B stations, WDIA, WBOK, WYLD, and WVOL. It was a key pop add on at secondary stations.

In the UK, it was Radio Clyde Personality Pick for the week of 15 February 1975.

=== Charts ===
It charted in the UK and for the week of 5 April, it had dropped down two positions from no. 16 to no. 18 in the Music Week Soul chart.

=== Appears on ===
It appears on Discotheque Special 5, released on Polydor 2482 246 in 1975, and Boogie Beat (Shag Yer Blooz Away), released on Ripete 2236 in 1996.

== John Schneider version ==
"Dreamin'"

Song by John Schneider

from the album Quiet Man
- A-side: "Dreamin'"
- B-side: "Let Me Love You"
- Written: 1982
- Length: 2:44
- Label: Scotti Bros. Records ZS5 02889
- Composer: B. DeVorzon - T. Ellis
- Producers: Tony Scotti and John D'Andrea

John Schneider released a version as a single which became a US hit for him in 1982.

=== Reception ===
"Dreamin'" was one of the six Singles to Watch in the Country section in the 8 May issue of Cash Box.

=== Airplay ===
For the week of 15 May, "Dreamin" with 14 adds was no. 8 on the Cash Box Most Added Country Radio, Country Singles list..

As per the 12 June issue of Cash Box, Schneider's single was a Programmers Pick by Brian Ringo at KOKE in Austin.

=== Charts ===
For the week of 15 May, "Dreamin' debuted at no. 90 in the Cash Box Top 100 Singles chart. It also debuted at no. 85 in the Cash Box Top 100 Country Singles chart.

For the week of 5 June, the single peaked at no. 69 on the Top 100 Singles chart, and held that position for another week.

For the week of 26 June, the single peaked at no. 32 in the Top 100 Country Singles chart, and held that position for another week.

Also, the US, it reached No. 21 on the Billboard adult contemporary chart, No. 32 on the country chart, and No. 45 on the Billboard Hot 100.

== Other versions ==
- The Cascades released a version as a single in India as the B-side to "Angel on My Shoulder".
