= Honey Hush =

Single by Big Joe Turner
- B-side: "Tomorrow Night"
- Released: August 1953
- Genre: Blues; rhythm and blues
- Length: 2:25
- Label: Atlantic
- Songwriter: Lou Willie Turner

Music video
- "Honey Hush" on YouTube

"Honey Hush" is a blues song, written by Big Joe Turner (although he assigned the copyright to his wife, Lou Willie Turner), recorded in May 1953 in New Orleans, Louisiana, and released that August by Atlantic Records. It was a number-one song on Billboard's Rhythm and Blues chart for eight weeks.

The single was Turner's second million-seller, following his 1951 "Chains of Love".

== Recording ==
Turner, a big Kansas City blues shouter, had been spending all of his time out on the road, while Atlantic's Ahmet Ertegun was getting nervous that his backlog of Turner recordings was running low. When Turner was near New Orleans, Ertegun insisted that he make some recordings. Atlantic's New Orleans recording studio was fully booked, so Turner recorded some sides in the studio of local radio station WDSU. He did not have his own band, but was able to round up the trombonist Pluma Davis and his band, the Rockers, as well as the boogie rhythm pianist, James Tolliver. Other musicians on the recording included Dimes Dupont on alto saxophone and Warren Hebrew on tenor saxophone.

== Lyrics ==
Like the session, the song is largely adlibbed traditional blues verses with various incongruous lines thrown in, to a standard 12-bar blues. It opens with the bold statement, "Aw let it roll like a big wheel in a Georgia cotton field, Honey hush!" In the song's title Turner reveals his typical attitude toward a woman who will not do what he tells her to do, while the tailgate trombone gives the woman's raucous answers back. Although some of his songs address the misery of relationships, his emotion in this song is upbeat. To quote music writer Arnold Shaw, in his book Honkers and Shouters:

"Love ain't nothin' but a lot of misery," he would declare, exhibiting no emotion in his characterization of the female as demanding, unprediciable, and untrustworthy. But unlike his predecessors in the blues, he did not cry or get uptight over it.

The spirit of the song is the good-natured optimism that characterized his work. His lyrics are sexually suggestive and aimed at an adult audience and his vocal style is that of an urban blues shouter – intimate and relaxed.

Come in this house, stop all that yakkety yak (2×)
Come fix my supper, don't want no talkin' back
Well you keep on jabberin', talk about this and that (2×)
I got news for you, baby, you ain't nothin' but an alley cat
Well you keep on jabberin', talk about this and that ( 2×)
Don't make me nervous, 'cause I'm holding a baseball bat
Hi-yo, hi-yo, Silver

The final lyric, featured in a call and response between Turner and the band, is a reference to the "Hi-Yo Silver!" trope popularised by the Lone Ranger television series, that aired on the ABC Television network from 1949 to 1957.

== Legacy ==
The advent of rock and roll narrowed the content of songs to adolescent preoccupations and made simple the complicated rhythms of rhythm and blues. The explicitly sexual content was too adult, as was the singer's strong voice tone as well as his raw assumptions about life. A year later, in 1954, a Turner song very similar to this one, "Shake, Rattle and Roll," with its boogie-woogie rhythm and squawking saxophone was cleaned up by Bill Haley to become a hit as rock and roll changed the face of music. Turner turned to recording songs by rock and roll writers, but his blues shouter voice betrayed him and his career faded.

However, not long after the rock and roll craze hit, a new audience of intellectuals, college students, and eventually beatniks, and then another with European blues fans joining in, gave singers in partial retirement or obscurity new opportunities although they had to clean up some to fit the new role of authenticity, fueled by the writings of Samuel Charters, demanded by these new audiences. For urban blues singers, having grown up in cities, it was convenient to be labelled as country singers to fit the criteria of purity.

In 1959, Turner re-recorded "a much tamer, lamer, teenage rock'n'roll version" of "Honey Hush" for Atlantic which was a mild hit and his last one. Turner returned to performing with jazz combos as the rock and roll founders settled in to please the suddenly important teenage market.

== Covers ==
- An early cover was the 1956 version by Johnny Burnette's Rock and Roll Trio.
- In 1965 Chuck Berry recorded his version for Chess Records.
- In 1981 Elvis Costello recorded a high-tempo version in Nashville, which appears on Almost Blue, an album of country covers.
- In 1999 Paul McCartney recorded a version which appeared on Run Devil Run, a covers album with David Gilmour, Ian Paice and others.

The song has been covered by—among many others—Jerry Lee Lewis, Albert King, Robert Nighthawk, Screaming Lord Sutch, Foghat, Coco Montoya, Fleetwood Mac (on the album Kiln House, listed as "Hi Ho Silver"), George Jones, Elvis Costello, Jools Holland (on his album The Informer.), NRBQ, and John Lindberg Trio.
