= Freedom (record label) =

American record label (1958–1959)

- Parent company: Liberty Records
- Founded: 1958
- Status: Defunct (1959)
- Distributor: Liberty Records
- Genre: Various
- Country of origin: United States
- Location: Hollywood, California

Freedom was a short lived subsidiary label of Liberty Records based in Hollywood, California.

== History ==
Liberty launched its first subsidiary, Freedom Records, during the summer of 1958 and Jerry Capehart was hired as A&R man. One of the first artists to be signed was Johnny Burnette. Eddie Cochran provided lead guitar on some of the singles that came out in 1958/59. Freedom closed down in the summer of 1959.
