= Komorów, Podkarpackie Voivodeship =

Komorów
- Village
- Location within Poland
- Coordinates: 50°21′N 21°44′E
- Country: Poland
- Voivodeship: Subcarpathian
- County: Kolbuszowa
- Gmina: Majdan Królewski
- Population: 1,495
- Website: http://www.komorow.sandomierz.opoka.org.pl/

Komorów [kɔˈmɔruf] is a village in the administrative district of Gmina Majdan Królewski, within Kolbuszowa County, Subcarpathian Voivodeship, in south-eastern Poland.
