= Eddie Bond =

American singer and guitarist (1933 – 2013)

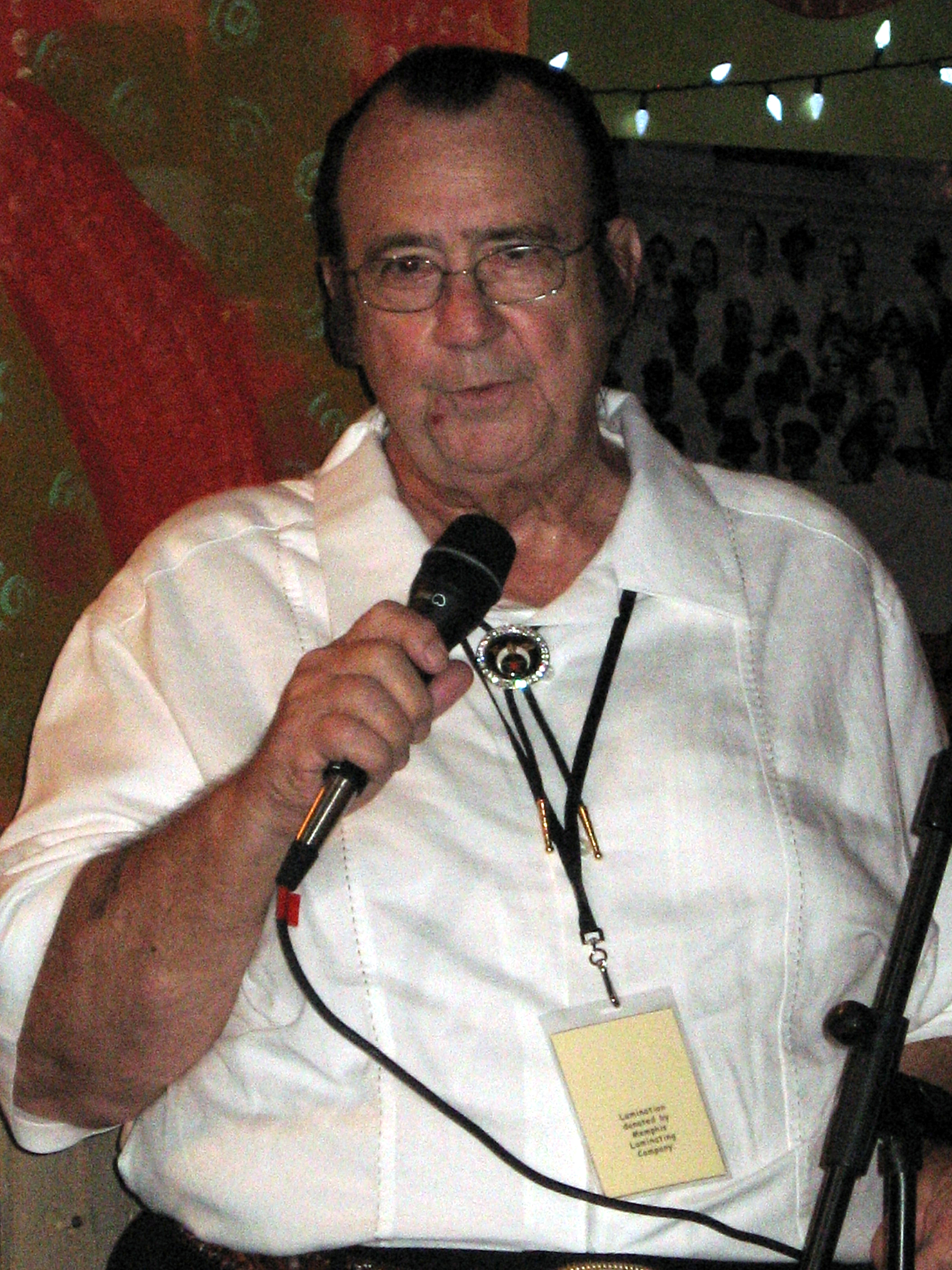
- Bond in 2008

Background information
- Born: July 1, 1933; Memphis, Tennessee, U.S.
- Died: March 20, 2013 (aged 79) Bolivar, Tennessee, U.S.
- Genres: Country; rockabilly
- Occupation(s): Singer, musician
- Years active: 1950s–1990s
- Labels: Mercury

Eddie Bond (July 1, 1933 – March 20, 2013) was an American singer and guitarist who was active in country music and rockabilly.

== Biography ==
In the mid-1950s, Bond recorded for Mercury Records and toured with Elvis Presley, Carl Perkins, Jerry Lee Lewis, Johnny Cash, Roy Orbison, Warren Smith and others. He is infamous for having rejected the then 18-year-old Elvis Presley, who was auditioning for Bond's band. It was shortly thereafter that Presley recorded his first single at Sun Records.

Bond's contribution to the genre has been recognized by the Rockabilly Hall of Fame.

He died of Alzheimer's disease in 2013.

== Discography ==
=== Albums ===
- 1982 - Rocking Daddy from Memphis Tennessee (Rockhouse)
- 1984 - Rocking Daddy from Memphis Tennessee Volume 2 (Rockhouse)
