= Barbara Pittman =

American singer (1938–2005)

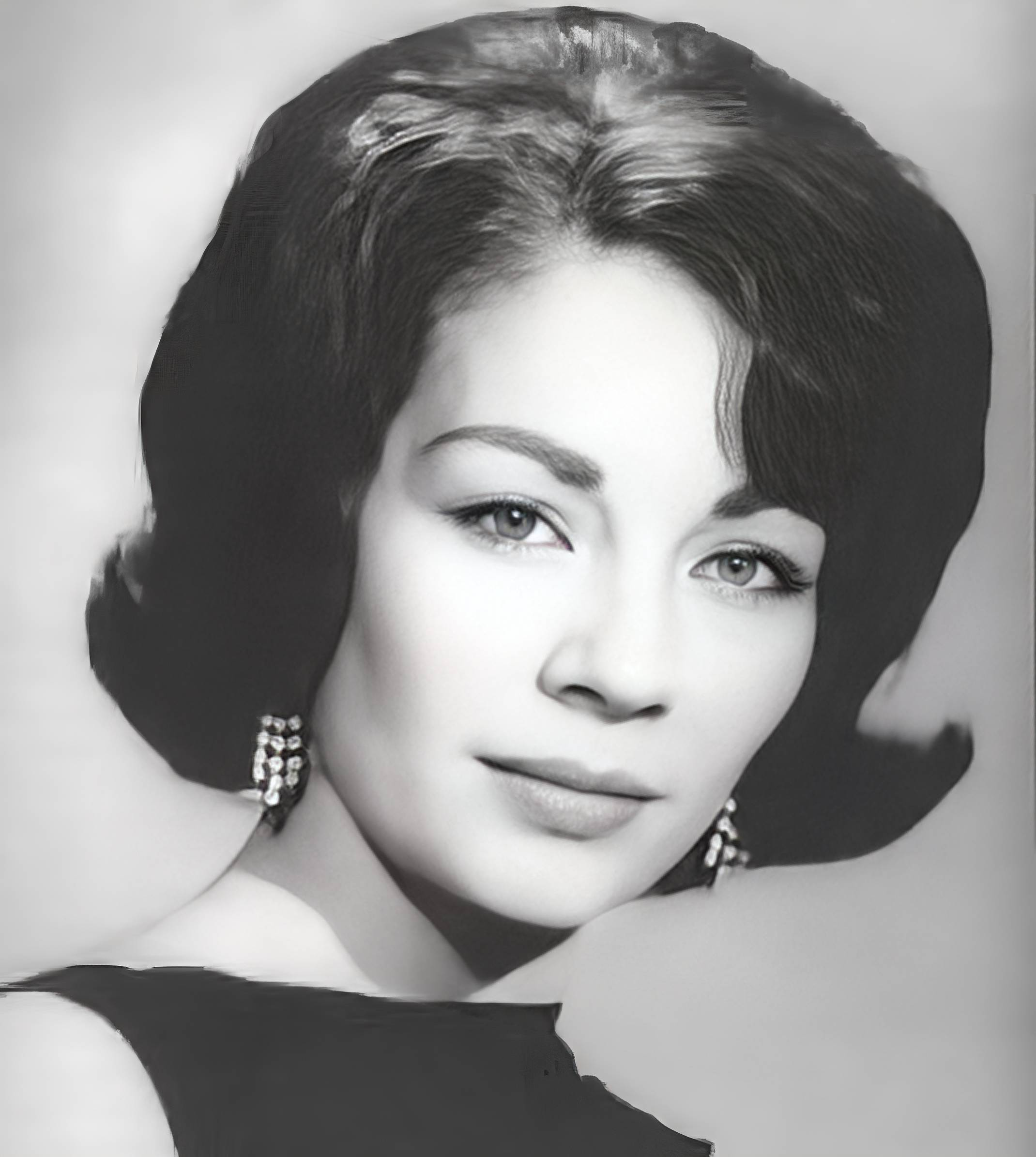

Background information
- Born: April 6, 1938; Memphis, Tennessee, U.S.
- Died: October 29, 2005 (aged 67) Memphis, Tennessee, U.S.
- Genres: Country; rockabilly
- Occupation: Singer
- Instrument: Vocals
- Years active: 1955–2005
- Labels: Sun; Phillips

Barbara Pittman (April 6, 1938 – October 29, 2005) was an American singer, one of the few female singers to record at Sun Studio. As a young teenager, she recorded some demos of songs for others. Pittman's most popular recordings include "I Need A Man" on the Sun label and "Two Young Fools in Love", released on Sam Phillips' International label.

== Biography ==
Pittman was born and grew up in Memphis, Tennessee, United States. As a child, she was friends and neighbors with Elvis Presley. She recalled to an interviewer, "I sang with him, I knew him, I lived down the street from him when we were kids in North Memphis. His mom and mine used to get together to have what they called Stanley parties. They call them Tupperware parties now. I practically lived out at Graceland in the 1950s before Elvis went into the service. He was going to take me on the road with him, and then he got drafted." It was Presley who first brought Pittman to Sun Studios.

Pittman spent time working in Lash LaRue's western shows in 1955–1956. When she returned, she began recording at Sun Records. Between 1956 and 1960, she would cut four different singles there as well as a host of material that was never released, including demo records. Her records did not achieve much commercial success; Pittman stated in interviews that this was due to a lack of promotion on the part of the label.

After her time at Sun, she moved to California in the 1960s, and she sang on the soundtracks of several motorcycle films, including Wild Angels, Wild on Wheels, and Hells Angels. This was under the name of Barbara and the Visitors. Pittman also recorded for Del-Fi Records, although no material was released by them.

Pittman died at her home in Memphis on October 29, 2005, of heart failure. She was 67.

== Discography ==
=== Singles ===
- "I Need A Man" / "No Matter Who's To Blame", Sun, 1956
- "I'm Getting Better All The Time" / "Two Young Fools in Love", Phillips, 1957
- "Everlasting Love" / "Cold Cold Heart", Phillips, 1958
- "Handsome Man" / "The Eleventh Commandment", Phillips, 1960

=== Compilation albums ===
- The Original Sun Sides, Rockhouse, 1983
- I Need A Man, Bear Family, 1989
- Getting Better All The Time, Charly, 1997

=== Live albums ===
- Texas Boogie – Recorded Live in Houston, Magnum, 1984
