= Ted Mack (radio and television host) =

American broadcaster, radio, and TV host

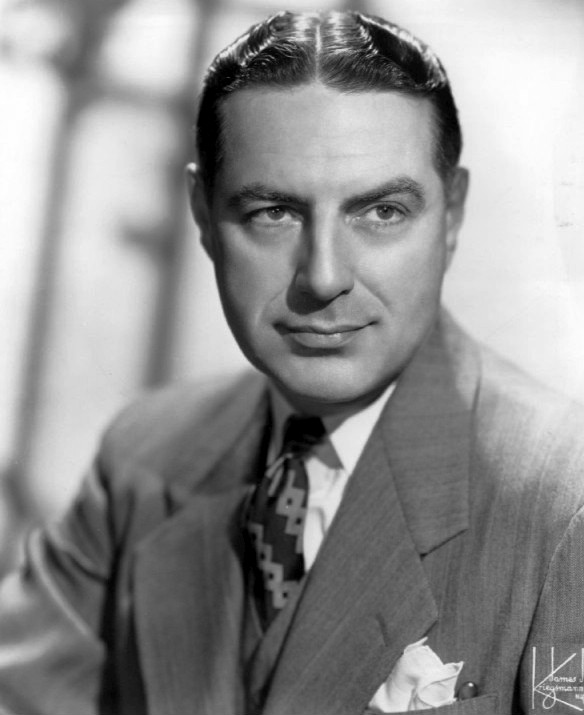
- Ted Mack in 1949
- Born: William Edward Maguiness; February 12, 1904; Greeley, Colorado
- Died: July 12, 1976 (aged 72); North Tarrytown, New York
- Occupations: Broadcaster; Bandleader; Musician
- Known for: Being host of Original Amateur Hour

William Edward Maguiness (February 12, 1904 – July 12, 1976) was an American radio and television host and musician, best known for hosting Ted Mack and The Original Amateur Hour.

== Early years ==
The son of a railroad brakeman, Mack was born in Greeley, Colorado. His mother was a teacher and a pianist. Mack graduated from Sacred Heart High School in Denver, Colorado, in 1922. He was class president there for three years in addition to playing football and basketball and playing in the school's orchestra. He went on to graduate from the University of Denver, where he majored in Law and Commerce, and funded his college education by playing saxophone in an orchestra.

== Big bands ==
Mack's career in show business began in 1926 when he joined Ben Pollack's orchestra. In the late 1920s, clarinetist and saxophonist Mack formed a dance band, under his real name. A nightclub owner disliked how "Edward Maguiness" looked on his marquee, so he changed the bandleader's name to the shorter and snappier "Ted Mack". At one point, Mack was known as "the performer with the longest run of any master of ceremonies at the Paramount theater, New York", having been in that role for five months.

Mack and his orchestra spent the summer of 1933 entertaining at the Chicago World's Fair, after which they had an engagement for two months in New York City. A 1934 newspaper review said, "Ted Mack and his bandmen furnish comedy fare and entertaining music in equal measure, and the group of personable young women who assist display talent as well as good looks."

== Film ==
Mack was musical supervisor for Metro-Goldwyn-Mayer, where he was orchestra director for The Great Ziegfeld and Beat the Band.

== Original Amateur Hour ==
The Original Amateur Hour began on radio in 1934 as Major Bowes' Amateur Hour, and ran until the 1946 death of its creator, Major Bowes. Mack, a talent scout who had directed the show under Bowes, revived it in 1948 for ABC Radio and the DuMont Television Network.

The show lasted on radio until 1952 and until 1970 on television, where it ran on all four major networks, ending as a Sunday afternoon CBS staple. A success in the early days of television, the program set the stage for numerous programs seeking talented stars, from The Gong Show to Star Search to American Idol to America's Got Talent.

Auditions for the show were generally held in New York's Radio City Music Hall. Those who passed the initial screening were invited to compete on the program, featuring amateurs whose performance were judged by viewers, voting via letters and phone calls. Contestants who won three times earned cash prizes, scholarships, or participation in a traveling stage show associated with the program.

Winners who went on to show business careers included singers Gladys Knight, Ann-Margret, Pat Boone, Raul Julia, Teresa Brewer, Irene Cara, The Rock and Roll Trio, and Los Concertinos from Puerto Rico.

Ted Mack and producer Lewis Graham (the former Lou Goldberg) programmed something for everybody. A single broadcast (Easter Sunday, 1959) featured an opera singer, a trumpet sextet, a dulcimer player, a kiddie dance troupe, a young vocalist, a dancer, a rhythm-and-blues combo, a barbershop quartet, and mother-and-son Irish step dancers. Mack's pleasant manner and unflappable calm put many nervous contestants at ease, and he used the same down-to-earth tone for commercials and public-service announcements.

== Other television ==
In 1951, Mack was host of Ted Mack's Family Hour on ABC. A TV reference book summarized the show as "A Sunday evening program of music, songs and comedy." In 1955, he had a daily afternoon program, Ted Mack's Matinee on NBC. A review of the April 20 episode in the April 30, 1955, issue of Billboard said, "Unpretentious and easy-going, NBC's new Ted Mack's Matinee looks as if it's going to provide housewives with a smooth, relaxing stanza to break up her [sic] daytime chores."

== Personal life ==
In 1926, Mack married Ellen Marguerite Overholt. They had no children but fostered children from Catholic charities at their home.

After The Original Amateur Hour ended its broadcast run, Mack became a lecturer at colleges and served as host of local amateur shows.

== Death ==
Mack died of heart failure on July 12, 1976, at Phelps Memorial Hospital in North Tarrytown, New York, at the age of 72. He was survived by his wife.
