= Henry Jerome =

- Also known as: Al Mortimer, Van Grayson
- Born: Henry Jerome Pasnik; November 12, 1917; New York City, U.S.
- Died: March 23, 2011 (aged 93) Plantation, Florida, U.S.
- Genre: Jazz
- Occupations: Musician, arranger, composer
- Instrument: Trumpet
- Labels: Decca, Coral, Circle, United Artists

Henry Jerome (November 12, 1917 – March 23, 2011) was an American big band leader, trumpeter, arranger, composer, and record company executive.

Jerome formed his first dance band in 1932 in Norwich, Connecticut. His bands flourished throughout the 1940s, 1950s, and early 1960s. He became an A&R director at Decca Records in 1959 and at Coral, a Decca subsidiary, in the late 1960s.

== Career ==
Jerome attended primary and secondary schools in Norwich, public for the former and Norwich Free Academy for the latter. He attended the Juilliard School of Music, studying trumpet with Max Schlossberg and composition and orchestration with William Vacchiano. Jerome formed his first professional orchestra while in 1931 when he was 14. In high school he received an offer from the American Export Lines for his orchestra to perform on a ship sailing from New York to Europe. Without quitting school, Jerome secured permission from the Norwich Free Academy to accept the job.

Henry Jerome and His Orchestra performed at clubs, hotels, ballrooms, and theaters throughout the United States, and began performing on radio and TV in 1940.

On February 28, 1948, the band was scheduled to perform at the Green Room of the Hotel Edison in New York City to fill a nine-day gap between Claudia Carroll's closing and Alvy West–Buddy Greco's opening on March 26. From then on, Henry Jerome and His Orchestra performed regularly.

In 1952, ABC Radio Network began broadcasting Dinner at the Green Room. According to a review in the December 11, 1948, issue of Billboard, Jerome had perfected the style of Hal Kemp, a softer style that suited many hotels.

The band included Alan Greenspan (1944) Clyde Reasinger (1960), and Joe Harnell (1944)

Jerome was A&R director at Coral Records, Decca Records, and MCA Records from 1959 to 1968. He became A&R director of United Artists Records from 1968 to 1970. In 1971, he became president of Green Menu Music Factory, collaborating with Kim Gannon, Leonard Whitcup, Bobbi Martin, Norman Simon, Angelo Musulino. He became a member of ASCAP in 1951. He used two pseudonyms, Van Grayson and Al Mortimer, to get royalties for musicians that he put on salary.

In the early 1960s, Henry Jerome and His Orchestra recorded eleven albums under the name "Brazen Brass", from which four singles reached the top 10 worldwide. Jerome conceived the idea and Dick Jacobs wrote the arrangements.

== Awards and honors ==
- Grammy Award, Best Score from an Original Cast Show Album, Promises, Promises, 1969
- Norwich, Connecticut, Native Son Award, 1974

== Discography ==
- Brazen Brass (Decca, 1957) OCLC 14216233
- Brazen Brass Plays Songs Everybody Knows (Decca, 1961) OCLC 13036833
- Brazen Brass Goes Hollywood (Decca, 1961) OCLC 13031099
- Brazen Brass Brings Back the Bands! (Decca, 1961) OCLC 12261131
- Brazen Brass Features Saxes (Decca, 1961) OCLC 15548677
- Brazen Brass Zings the Strings (Decca, 1961) OCLC 13030901
- Brazen Brass Goes Latin (Decca, 1961) OCLC 24624512
- Brazen Brass: New sounds in Folk Music (Decca, 1961) OCLC 761582619, 657589374
- Brazen Brass: Strings in Dixieland (Decca, 1961) OCLC 657589375, 761582621
- Brazen Brass: Legends of Lounge (Decca, 1961)
- Cocktail Brazen Brass Brunswick, 1965)
