= The Original Amateur Hour =

American radio series that later moved to television

1950 trade advertisement

The Original Amateur Hour is an American radio and television program. The show was a continuation of Major Bowes Amateur Hour, which had been a radio staple from 1934 to 1945. Major Edward Bowes, the originator of the program and its master of ceremonies, left the show in 1945 and died the following year. He was ultimately succeeded by Ted Mack, when the show was brought into television in 1948.

The show is a progenitor of later, similar programs such as Star Search, American Idol, and America's Got Talent.

== Format and notable contestants ==
The format was almost always the same. At the beginning of the show, the talent's order of appearance was determined by spinning a wheel. After it was announced how many episodes the current one marked (the final broadcast on CBS being the 1,651st), the wheel was spun. As the wheel spun, the words "Round and round she goes, and where she stops nobody knows" were always intoned. From the late 1950s forward, the wheel was gone: it was symbolized by flute arpeggios as Ted Mack invoked the traditional phrase.

Various acts, sometimes singers or other musicians and quite often vaudeville fare such as jugglers, tap dancers, baton twirlers, and the like, would perform, with the audience being asked to vote for their favorites by postcard or telephone. The telephone number "JUdson 6-7000" was on a banner at the bottom of the screen for viewers to call.

As the show gained markets outside New York, Mack would give the address ("Box 191 Radio City Station") where viewers could send their postcards; he did this after every act. The winners were invited to appear on the next week's show. Three-time winners were eligible for the annual championship, with the grand-prize winner receiving a US$2000 scholarship.

Ted Mack ensured that the show was very fast-paced. Despite the program's title, it was generally only a half-hour show, the only exception to this rule being from March 1956 to June 1957 on ABC, when it was expanded to an hour.

Some contestants became minor celebrities at the time, but few ever became really big show-business stars, like the six Ebe Sisters, whose fame was short-lived. The two greatest successes of the show's television era were Gladys Knight, then only a child, and Pat Boone. Boone's appearances on the show probably caused the closest thing that it ever had to a scandal. After he had appeared, and won, for several weeks, it was revealed that he had appeared on the rival CBS Television show Arthur Godfrey's Talent Scouts, meaning that he was technically not an "amateur" singer. He was removed from the program, but by then his fame was assured. At twenty-three, Boone was hosting his own variety show on ABC, The Pat Boone Chevy Showroom, which aired from 1957 to 1960.

Other future celebrities discovered on the show include Ann-Margret (in 1958), Jose Feliciano (in 1962), Irene Cara (in 1967), and Tanya Tucker (in 1969). Louis Farrakhan appeared in 1949 playing a violin, under his birth name Louis Wolcott. Future child actor Roger Mobley appeared with an older brother and older sister in a musical trio. Future comedian Robert Klein appeared as part of a doo-wop singing group, "The Teen Tones". The greatest fame attained by anyone appearing on the show was that achieved by Frank Sinatra, who appeared on the show during its radio days with "The Hoboken Four".

During World War II, some in the American armed forces believed that someone involved with the program was a Nazi sympathizer, because after many episodes aired, an American naval vessel would supposedly be sunk. The claim was that coded information was passed out in the course of the broadcast. Some accused Bowes himself, but none of these accusations could ever be proven. Bowes was one of President Franklin D. Roosevelt's closest friends and was personally responsible for having the swimming pool constructed at the White House when FDR was in office. As the years went by, the audience for this program aged as well. The Sunday-afternoon version of the series, which aired on CBS in the 1960s, was invariably sponsored by Geritol and other patent medicines manufactured by their long-time sponsor, the J. B. Williams Company, best known for Aqua Velva after-shave lotion ("There's something about an Aqua Velva man!") and Lectric Shave pre-shave lotion.

== History ==
=== Radio years ===
In 1934, Bowes started the radio show on WHN in New York City. Bowes' field assistant was Ted Mack, who scouted and auditioned talent for the program. Mack brought the show back in 1948 on ABC Radio, where it ran until 1952. When Mack assumed the host duties, his position in the field was taken by Albert Fisher.

The official archives of The Original Amateur Hour and the rights to the original programs and related material are now owned by Fisher. He has donated the radio recordings and television films and tapes to the Library of Congress, and has compiled a DVD collection of highlights from the series.

=== Television debut (1948–1954) ===
On January 18, 1948, the television debut came on the DuMont Television Network, with Mack as the host. The regular staff for the television show included: Lou Goldberg (aka Lewis Graham); Lloyd Marx, musical director; accompanist Dotty Marx, his wife; Jac Hein, writer/producer; and Marguerite (Dwyer) Scheid, talent scout. The show regularly traveled to other cities across the United States and made at least two trips to Europe for the USO. In the early 1950s, the show went to Washington, D.C., for a program featuring contestants from the United States Congress and the Truman administration.

The series is one of only six shows (the others were The Arthur Murray Party; Down You Go; The Ernie Kovacs Show; Pantomime Quiz; and Tom Corbett, Space Cadet) to appear on all four TV networks during the Golden Age of Television. The series was broadcast weekly, on early Sunday evenings, on DuMont until September 25, 1949, then moved to NBC Television in October 1949, where it remained until September 1952. NBC then hosted it from April 1953 to September 1954.

The Original Amateur Hour finished at #27 in the Nielsen ratings for the 1950–1951 season.

=== Move to other networks (1955–1970) ===
The show moved to ABC (October 1955 to June 1957), then returned to NBC (July 1957 to October 1958). It then ran from May 1959 to October 1959 on CBS, before returning to ABC for a last prime-time run from March 1960 to September 26, 1960. Even then the show wasn't finished—it ran for another decade as a late-Sunday-afternoon feature on CBS, beginning on October 2, 1960.

Many long-running CBS shows were canceled in 1970–71 because they attracted viewers of an advanced age. Mack's show was among the first to go, although not as a direct result of the other cancellations. Its Sunday afternoon timeslot was subsumed by the NFL on CBS at the start of the 1970 season as a result of the AFL–NFL merger and its expanded game slate, with CBS beginning to carry football doubleheaders. The network announced the show's cancellation on November 2, as Geritol dropped its sponsorship of the series, one of the last vestiges of the Golden Age where single-series sponsors were more common.

On September 27, 1970, the final show was broadcast.

=== Revival on The Family Channel (1992) ===
In 1992 Albert Fisher revived the program (as The New Original Amateur Hour) on cable television network The Family Channel (now Freeform) hosted by weatherman Willard Scott. This revival lasted one season, in spite of its popularity and high ratings.

It featured the debut of highly successful and famous Backstreet Boys member Nick Carter. This was a catalyst for other child stars including Elizabeth Byler, who starred in October Sky, Ernest Goes to Camp, and Other Voices, Other Rooms, and Summer Pulley, who went on to become a cast member of Disney Channel's The Mickey Mouse Club, Nickelodeon's Clarissa Explains It All and the 1989 film Parenthood. The show also revived the practice of counting the number of the original episodes, with the first being show number 1,652 and the last, show number 1,664.

== See also ==
- List of programs broadcast by the DuMont Television Network
- List of surviving DuMont Television Network broadcasts

== Bibliography ==
- David Weinstein, The Forgotten Network: DuMont and the Birth of American Television (Philadelphia: Temple University Press, 2004) ISBN 1-59213-245-6
- Alex McNeil, Total Television, Fourth edition (New York: Penguin Books, 1980) ISBN 0-14-024916-8
- Tim Brooks and Earle Marsh, The Complete Directory to Prime Time Network TV Shows, Third edition (New York: Ballantine Books, 1964) ISBN 0-345-31864-1
