= Rockabilly Hall of Fame =

Organization related to the history of rockabilly

- Established: 1997
- Location: Nashville, Tennessee; United States
- Website: rockabillyhalloffame.org

The original Rockabilly Hall of Fame was an organization and website launched on March 21, 1997, to present early history and information relating to the artists and personalities involved in rockabilly.

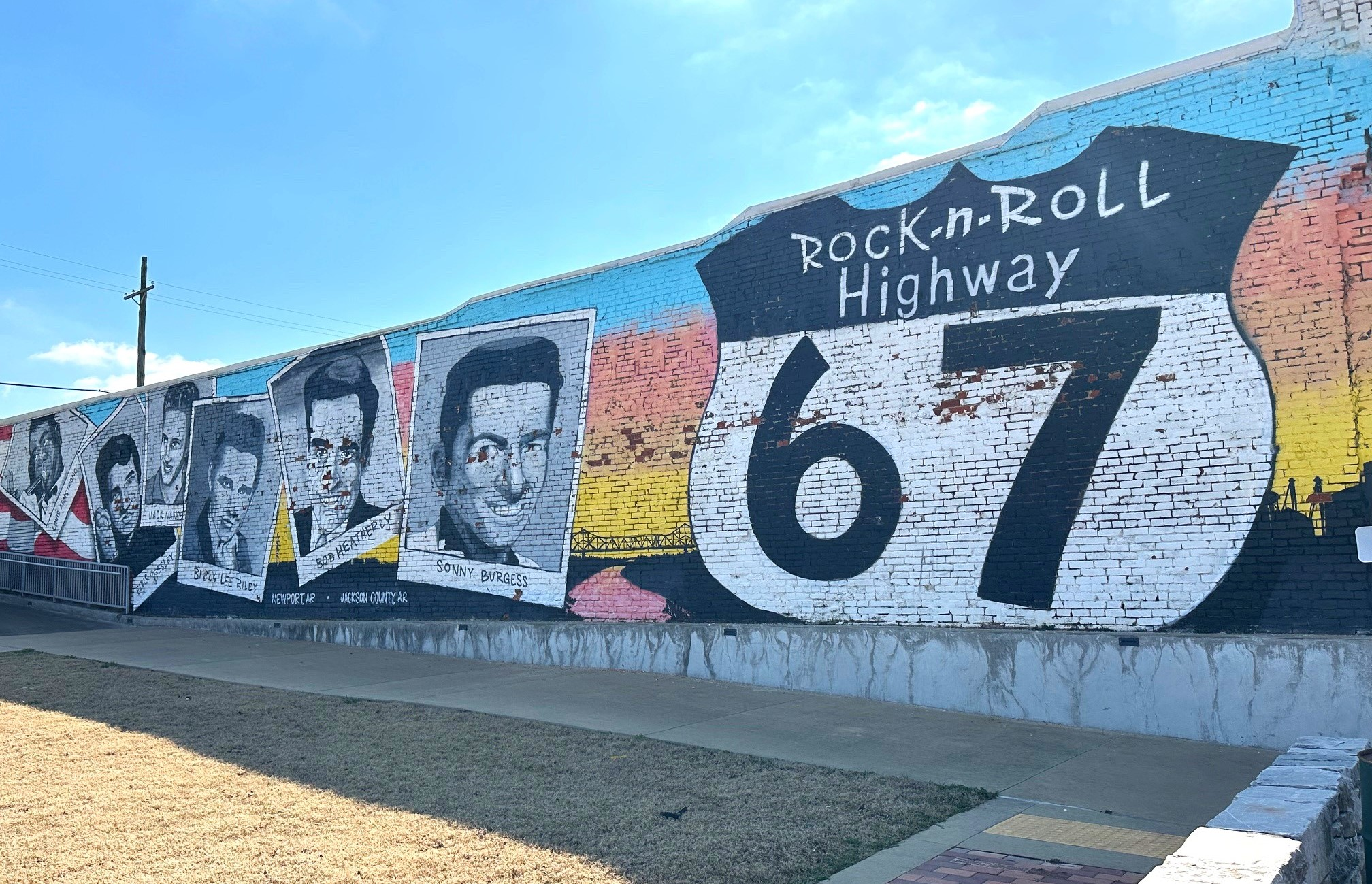
Rock-n-Roll Highway 67 mural in Newport, AR showing multiple inductees including Sonny Burgess, Billy Lee Riley, and Elvis Presley

Headquartered in Nashville, Tennessee and the creation of Bob Timmers, the not-for-profit entity maintained a website that was supported in part by the fans and artists of the music it represented. The site had a UK representative (Rod Pyke) and Canadian representative (Johnny Vallis). Over 5,000 "legends" were listed on the web site, and about 400 were "inducted". Inductions were restricted to artists with notable performances prior to (and including) 1962.

Its first induction certificate was issued on November 16, 1997, for singer Gene Vincent. Honorees have included pioneer singers, songwriters, disc jockeys, and promoters/producers such as Sun Records owner Sam Phillips.

The foundation became inactive in 2018, with Timmers dying on March 22, 2022. However, a successor organization, the Rockabilly Hall of Fame & Museum, absorbed all of Timmers' works and is continuing to give this roots-music genre its place in American music history. The Museum exists only on-line now, but with the goal of creating a physical space in the future.

== See also ==
- List of music museums
