= Elliot Minor discography =

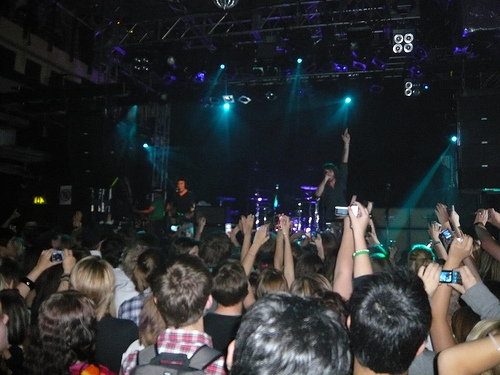
- Elliot Minor live at the 02 Academy Islington
- Studio albums: 2
- Extended plays: 1
- Singles: 10
- Music videos: 12

York-based rock band Elliot Minor have released two studio albums, one acoustic album, one extended play (EP), 10 singles and 12 music videos.

== Albums ==
=== Studio albums ===
List of albums, with selected chart positions
Title	Album details	Peak chart positions			
Title	Album details	UK	UK Indie	IRE	SCO
Elliot Minor	Released: 14 April 2008; Label: Repossession, Warner Music	6	—	30	5
Solaris	Released: 19 October 2009; Label: Repossession	73	9	—	62

=== Other albums ===
List of other albums, with selected details
Title	Album details
Solaris Acoustic	Released: 15 November 2010; Label: Repossession

== Extended plays ==
List of EPs, with selected details
Title	EP details
iTunes Live: London Festival '08: Elliot Minor	Released: 11 July 2008; Label: Repossession

== Singles ==
List of singles, with selected chart positions
Title	Year	Peak chart positions			Album
Title	Year	UK	UK Indie	SCO	Album
"Parallel Worlds"	2007	22	1	1	Elliot Minor
"Jessica"	2007	19	1	11	Elliot Minor
"The White One Is Evil"	2007	27	—	13	Elliot Minor
"Still Figuring Out"	2008	17	—	5	Elliot Minor
"Time After Time"	2008	47	—	8	Elliot Minor
"Discover (Why the Love Hurts)"	2009	—	—	—	Solaris
"Electric High"	2009	120	—	—	Solaris
"Solaris" (Winter Olympics version)	2010	—	—	—	Solaris
"I Believe"	2010	—	—	—	Solaris
"All My Life"	2014	—	—	—	Non-album single
"How Does it Feel"	2025	—	—	—	Non-album single

== Videography ==
=== Music videos ===
Year	Song	Album
2007	"Parallel Worlds"	Elliot Minor
2007	"Jessica"	Elliot Minor
2007	"The White One Is Evil"	Elliot Minor
2008	"Still Figuring Out"	Elliot Minor
2008	"Parallel Worlds"(re-release)	Elliot Minor
2008	"Time After Time"	Elliot Minor
2009	"Discover (Why the Love Hurts)"	Solaris
2009	"Solaris"	Solaris
2009	"Electric High"	Solaris
2009	"All Along"	Solaris
2010	"Fireflies" (Owl City cover)	Non-album song
2010	"I Believe"	Solaris
