= Solaris Acoustic =

Studio album by Elliot Minor
- Released: 15 November 2010
- Recorded: 2010
- Genre: Classical; acoustic
- Label: Repossession

Elliot Minor chronology
Solaris (2009)	Solaris Acoustic (2010)

Solaris Acoustic is an acoustic album by English pop rock band Elliot Minor. The album was released on 15 November 2010 along with a live DVD (Kerrang! Live Special) filmed at the Relentless Garage, London.

== Track listing ==
Solaris Acoustic track listing
No.	Title	Writer(s)	Length
1.	"The Dancer"	Alex Davies	4:05
2.	"I Believe"	Davies	3:50
3.	"Electric High"	Davies	4:18
4.	"Coming Home"	Davies/Ed Minton	4:04
5.	"Carry On"	Davies/Minton	3:40
6.	"Solaris"	Davies	3:35
7.	"Better Than the Courtroom"	Davies	3:43
8.	"All Along"	Davies	3:54
9.	"Discover (Why the Love Hurts)"	Davies	3:04
10.	"Shiver"	Davies	4:02
11.	"Tethered"	Davies/Andrew McMahon	3:59
12.	"Let's Turn This Back Around"	Davies/Minton	3:50

=== Bonus tracks ===
No.	Title	Writer(s)	Length
13.	"Blinding Light"	Davies	4:00
14.	"Glorious" (Andreas Johnson cover)	Andreas Johnson	3:30

== Personnel ==
- Alex Davies – lead and backing vocals, acoustic guitars, piano, string arrangements
- Ed Minton – lead and backing vocals, acoustic guitars

== Kerrang! Live Special DVD ==
No.	Title	Writer(s)	Length
1.	"Jessica"	Alex Davies/Ed Minton/Dan Hetherton
2.	"Running Away"	Davies/Minton/D.Hetherton
3.	"Time After Time"	Davies/Minton
4.	"Solaris"	Davies
5.	"Electric High"	Davies
6.	"Tethered"	Davies/Andrew McMahon
7.	"Discover (Why the Love Hurts)"	Davies
8.	"Still Figuring Out"	Davies/Minton
9.	"I Believe"	Davies
10.	"Parallel Worlds"	Davies/Minton
11.	"Better Than the Courtroom"	Davies
12.	"Shiver"	Davies

Music videos for:

- "Discover (Why the Love Hurts)"
- "Solaris"
- "Electric High"
- "I Believe"

=== Personnel ===
- Alex Davies – lead and backing vocals, lead guitars
- Ed Minton – lead and backing vocals, rhythm guitars
- Teddy Hetherton – bass guitars
- Ali Paul – keyboards
- Dan Hetherton – drums, backing vocals
