= Lucky Star =

Lucky Star, The Lucky Star or Lucky Starr may refer to:

== Art, entertainment, and media ==
=== Anime and manga ===
- Lucky Star (manga), a Japanese multi-media franchise
- "Lucky Star", one of the Angel Frames from the anime and manga series Galaxy Angel

=== Film ===
- Lucky Star (1929 film), an American film
- Lucky Star (2013 film), an Indian film
- The Lucky Star (1943 film), a French comedy film
- The Lucky Star (1980 film), a Canadian drama
- The Lucky Star (1997 film), a Spanish film
- Lucky Star (2024 film), a Canadian film directed by Gillian McKercher

=== Literature ===
- Lucky Star (novel), a 2007 novel by Cathy Cassidy
- Lucky Starr series, a series of juvenile science fiction stories by Isaac Asimov

=== Music ===
==== Songs ====
- "Lucky Star" (Madonna song), a 1983 song by Madonna
- "Lucky Star" (Basement Jaxx song), 2003
- "Lucky Star" (Johnson & Häggkvist song), a 2008 song by Andreas Johnson and Carola Häggkvist
- "Lucky Star" (Gene Vincent song), 1961 song
- "Lucky Star" (Superfunk song), a 2000 song by Superfunk, featuring Ron Carroll
- "Lucky Star" (Shinee song), a 2014 song by Shinee
- "Lucky Star", a song by Alex Lloyd from Black the Sun
- "Lucky Star", a song by Elliot Minor from Elliot Minor
- "Lucky Star (Ain't What You Are)" is a protest song and music video by Ike Moriz, 2015
- "Lucky Star", a song by Goo Goo Dolls from Superstar Car Wash
- "The Lucky Star", a song by The Brilliant Green from Los Angeles
- "Lucky Star", the ending theme song for the anime Prétear
- "Lucky Star" 2006 single by The Legends

==== Other music ====
- Lucky Starr (singer), (born 1940) stage name of Leslie Morrison, Australian pop singer and TV host
- Lucky Star, a 2004 album by Daniel Siegert
- The theme song(s) to the Lucky Star anime, CD singles, etc. see List of Lucky Star albums

=== Other art, entertainment and media ===
- Lucky Star (advertisement), a 2002 advertisement, in the form of a movie trailer, for the Mercedes SL
- Lucky Star, a television station in the United Kingdom
- The Lucky Star, an 1899 English comic opera composed by Ivan Caryll
- "Lucky Star", a common name for an origami design that resembles a small, rounded star

== Transportation ==
- Lucky Star Bus Lines, a Boston to New York City Chinatown bus line
- MV Lucky Star, ships with the name

== See also ==
- Lucky Stars (disambiguation)
- Lucky Strike
- My Lucky Star (disambiguation)
- Shooting Star (disambiguation)
- "When You Wish Upon a Star"
- Wish Upon a Star
