= More Songs by Ricky =

Studio album by Ricky Nelson
- Released: July 1960
- Genre: Rock and roll; rockabilly
- Length: 27:16
- Label: Imperial
- Producer: Charles "Bud" Dant

Ricky Nelson chronology
Ricky Sings Spirituals (1960)	More Songs by Ricky (1960)	Rick Is 21 (1961)

Singles from More Songs by Ricky
- 1. "I'm Not Afraid" Released: July, 1960

More Songs by Ricky is the fifth studio album by rock and roll and pop idol Ricky Nelson, released in July 1960 by Imperial Records. The album was recorded at Master Recorders studios in Hollywood, California, United States.

== Overview ==
The album contains old standards from his dad Ozzie Nelson's era, including "When Your Lover Has Gone", "Baby Won't You Please Come Home", "Time After Time", and "Again". The album was the last to credit his first name as "Ricky" and final studio album credited as "Ricky Nelson" during his lifetime. Jimmie Haskell arranged the album and Charles "Bud" Dant produced it.

== Charts ==
The album debuted on the Billboard Best Selling LPs chart in the issue dated August 29, 1960, remaining on the chart for 22 weeks and peaking at number 18. It reached No. 24 on the Cashbox albums chart during an 11-week stay on the chart. The only single from the album was "I'm Not Afraid", which debuted on the Billboard Hot 100 in the issue dated September 5, 1960, peaking at number 27 during its eight-week stay. and number 40 on the Cashbox singles chart,

== Rerelease ==
The album was released on compact disc by Capitol Records on June 19, 2001, as tracks 1 through 12 on a pairing of two albums on one CD with tracks 19 through 30 consisting of Nelson's 1961 album, Rick Is 21. Bear Family included also the album in the 2001 The American Dream box set.

== Reception ==
Professional ratings
Review scores
Source	Rating
AllMusic	2/5 stars
Disc	4/5 stars
The Encyclopedia of Popular Music	2/5 stars

Cashbox praised Nelson for his "performances of ballad evergreens 'Again,' 'Time After Time' and 'When Your Lover Has Gone' to the more rousing rockers." Billboard in its Spotlight of the Week album reviews, stated that "Nelson warbles with easy charm on a group of great standards and a few originals", Variety mentions "He has a mixture of familiar and un-familiar songs that he twangs through easily" Ken Graham of Disc described the album as "his excellent albums", giving it four-star rating.

William Ruhlmann of AllMusic said that "Nelson turned back to the music of his bandleader father Ozzie, cutting covers of songs from the 1920s ("Baby Won't You Please Come Home," "I'd Climb the Highest Mountain"), the 1930s ("When Your Lover Has Gone"), and the 1940s ("Time After Time," "Again") in arrangements that incorporated not only horns, but also strings and chirpy female backup vocals. It was all a big change from Nelson's previous recordings, and it did not restore his commercial fortunes, giving it two-star rating. It received the same rating from The Encyclopedia of Popular Music.

== Track listing ==
=== Side one ===
No.	Title	Writer(s)	Length
1.	"I'm Not Afraid"	Felice Bryant	2:37
2.	"Baby, Won't You Please Come Home"	Charles Warfield, Clarence Williams	2:10
3.	"Here I Go Again"	John Berry, Don Covay	2:10
4.	"I'd Climb the Highest Mountain"	Louis Yule Brown, Sidney Clare	2:08
5.	"Make Believe"	Marie Keller	2:11
6.	"Ain't Nothin' But Love"	Baker Knight	2:20

=== Side two ===
No.	Title	Writer(s)	Length
1.	"When Your Lover Has Gone" (From Warner Bros. Pictures Blonde Crazy)	Einar Aaron Swan	2:23
2.	"Proving My Love"	Baker Knight	2:03
3.	"Hey, Pretty Baby"	Dorsey Burnette	2:18
4.	"Time After Time" (From the Metro-Goldwyn-Mayer film It Happened in Brooklyn)	Sammy Cahn, Jule Styne	2:12
5.	"I'm All Through with You"	Baker Knight	2:45
6.	"Again" (From 20th Century Fox Pictures Road House)	Lionel Newman, Dorcas Cochran	1:52

== Charts ==
=== Album ===
Chart (1960)	Peak position
U.S. Billboard Best Selling LPs (Billboard)	18
U.S. Cashbox	24

=== Singles ===
Title	U.S. Hot 100	U.S Cashbox
"I'm Not Afraid"	27	40
