= Album Seven by Rick =

Studio album by Rick Nelson
- Released: March 1962
- Studio: United Western, Hollywood
- Genre: Rock and roll; rockabilly
- Length: 27:18
- Label: Imperial
- Producer: Charles "Bud" Dant

Rick Nelson chronology
Rick Is 21 (1961)	Album Seven by Rick (1962)	Best Sellers by Rick Nelson (1963)

Singles from Album Seven by Rick
- 1. "Summertime" Released: February 24, 1962; 2. "There's Not A Minute" Released: August 1963; 3. "Today's Teardrops" Released: September 1963; 4. "Congratulations" Released: February 1964

Album Seven by Rick is the seventh studio album by rock and roll and pop idol Rick Nelson, released in March 1962 by Imperial Records. This was his final LP for the label. The album was recorded at United Western Recorders studios in Los Angeles, California. It featured Nelson's usual group of songwriters, including Jerry Fuller. Jimmie Haskell was the arranger and Charles "Bud" Dant produced the album.

The album debuted on the Billboard Top LPs chart in the issue dated April 14, 1962, and remained on the chart for 20 weeks, peaking at number 27. It reached No. 31 on the Cashbox albums chart during a ten-week run.

The album was released on compact disc by Beat Goes On on January 30, 2001, as tracks 1 through 12 on a pairing of two albums on one disc with tracks 13 through 24 consisting of Nelson's 1963 compilation album, It's Up to You. It was released as one of two albums on one CD by Capitol Records on June 19, 2001, along with Nelson's 1960 EP, Ricky Sings Spirituals. Bear Family included the album in The American Dream box set in 2001.

== Singles ==
The singles from the album, "Summertime" debuted on the Billboard Hot 100 chart on March 10, 1962, spending one week at number 89 during its three-weeks stay, and number 111 on the Cashbox singles chart. "There's Not a Minute", spent a week on the Billboard Bubbling Under Hot 100 Singles chart in the issue dated September 7, 1963, and peaked at number 127. and number 149 on the Cashbox singles chart. "Today's Tearsdrops", was released as a single to coincide with the release of the 1964 Imperial compilation Rick Nelson sings For You, and entered the Hot 100 issue dated November 30, 1963, spending one week at number 54 during its nine-weeks stay, and number 65 on the Cashbox singles during its seven-week stay. and "Congratulations", was also released as a single to coincide with the release of the 1964 Imperial compilation Rick Nelson sings For You, and entered the Hot 100 issue dated March 14, 1964, spending one week at number 63 during its five-weeks stay, and number 104 on the Cashbox singles chart.

== Reception ==
Professional ratings
Review scores
Source	Rating
AllMusic	3/5 stars
The Encyclopedia of Popular Music	2/5 stars
Disc	3/5 stars

Upon release, Billboard stated that "Nelson's warbling is folksy, sincere and loaded with teen appeal", singing "everything from Gershwin...to rockabilly". Variety wrote in their review that "there doesn't seem to be anything ... in long range statue but [Nelson's] homespun styling makes [th]em sound good at the moment". Cashbox claims "Nelson's teen admirers should come out in force for this seventh helping of his vocal talents" and that he "dishes up attractive renditions of 'Congratulations,' 'Excuse Me Baby,' and 'Poor Loser.'" Nigel Hunter of Disc was critical of the set singling out Nelson's "tasteless butchering of Gershwin's 'Summertime'" and questioning why the producers "altered the melody line of ... 'I Can't Stop Lovin' You."

Retrospectively, William Ruhlmann of AllMusic thinks "the album is a good set of songs mostly written for Nelson by his old guard of songwriters". Like Disc's Hunter, Ruhlmann believed the "rock & roll arrangement" given to "Summertime" "would have surprised George Gershwin", and called the choice of covering "I Can't Stop Loving You" "inspired". Still, while a "disappointing seller", he considers the album "a worthy follow-up to Rick Is 21.

== Track listing ==
=== Side one ===
No.	Title	Writer(s)	Length
1.	"Summertime" (from the Broadway Musical: "Porgy and Bess")	George Gershwin, DuBose Heyward	2:14
2.	"Congratulations"	Jerry Fuller	2:16
3.	"Baby You Don't Know"	Dave Burgess, Jerry Fuller	1:54
4.	"I Can't Stop Loving You"	Don Gibson	2:39
5.	"Excuse Me Baby"	Dorsey Burnette	2:37
6.	"History of Love"	Dave Burgess, Jerry Fuller	2:04

=== Side two ===
No.	Title	Writer(s)	Length
1.	"Today's Teardrops"	Gene Pitney, Aaron Schroeder	2:05
2.	"Mad Mad World"	Dorsey Burnette, Joe Osborn	2:01
3.	"Thank You Darling"	Jackie DeShannon, Sharon Sheeley	1:38
4.	"Poor Loser"	Jerry Fuller	2:19
5.	"Stop Sneakin' Around"	Baker Knight	2:34
6.	"There's Not a Minute"	Clint Ballard, Jr., Frederick Tobias	2:24

== Personnel ==
- Guitar: James Burton, Rick Nelson
- Bass: Joe Osborn
- Drums: Richie Frost
- Piano: Ray Johnson

== Charts ==
Chart (1962)	Peak position
US Top LPs (Billboard)	27
US Cashbox Albums	31

=== Singles ===
Year	Title	U.S. Hot 100	U.S. Cashbox
1962	"Summertime"	89	111
1963	"There's Not a Minute"	127	149
1963	"Today's Teardrops"	54	65
1964	"Congratulations"	63	104
