= Best Sellers by Rick Nelson =

Compilation album by Rick Nelson
- Released: February 1963
- Recorded: 1957–1959
- Genres: Rock and roll, rockabilly, pop
- Length: 25:25
- Labels: Imperial; LP 9218
- Producer: Charles "Bud" Dant

Rick Nelson chronology
Album Seven by Rick (1962)	Best Sellers by Rick Nelson (1963)	For Your Sweet Love (1963)

Best Sellers By Rick Nelson is a compilation album by rock and roll and pop idol Rick Nelson that was released in February 1963 by Imperial Records. It was Nelson's first greatest hits compilation on the Imperial label. it features some of his early hits including "Be-Bop Baby", "Waitin' in School", "Believe What You Say", "Have I Told You Lately That I Love You?" and others, by the time of its release Nelson had left Imperial for Decca which he signed for 20 years a few months earlier.

The compilation debuted on the Billboard Top LPs chart in the issue dated March 4, 1963, peaking at No. 112 during a four-week stay on the chart. It reached No. 36 on the Cashbox albums chart.

== Reception ==
Professional ratings
Review scores
Source	Rating
AllMusic	3/5 stars
The Encyclopedia of Popular Music	2/5 stars

Jason Ankeny of AllMusic said that "affords a wonderful opportunity to experience hits like "Waitin' in School" and "Stood Up" that have been marginalized (if not altogether disregarded) by myopic oldies radio play lists—particularly revelatory is 1958's "Believe What You Say," a chugging rocker in the mold of vintage Buddy Holly."

== Track listing ==
=== Side one ===
No.	Title	Writer(s)	Length
1.	"Be-Bop Baby"	Pearl Lendhurst	2:00
2.	"Have I Told You Lately That I Love You (From The Republic Pictures: Sing Neighbor Sing"	Scotty Wiseman	1:58
3.	"Waitin' in School"	Johnny Burnette, Dorsey Burnette	2:02
4.	"Stood Up"	Dub Dickerson, Erma Herrold	1:57
5.	"Believe What You Say"	Johnny Burnette, Dorsey Burnette	2:04
6.	"That's All"	Alan Brandt, Bob Haymes	2:05

=== Side two ===
No.	Title	Writer(s)	Length
1.	"Poor Little Fool"	Sharon Sheeley	2:32
2.	"Lonesome Town"	Baker Knight	2:17
3.	"I'm in Love Again"	Dave Bartholomew, Fats Domino	2:20
4.	"Teenage Doll"	George Lendhurst, Pearl Lendhurst	1:40
5.	"Baby I'm Sorry"	Kenneth Scott	2:20
6.	"Just a Little Too Much"	Johnny Burnette	2:10

== Personnel ==
- Guitar: James Burton, Joe Maphis, Rick Nelson
- Bass: James Kirkland, Joe Osborn
- Drums: Richie Frost
- Piano: Gene Garf, Ray Johnson
- Backing Vocals: The Jordanaires

== Charts ==
Chart (1962)	Peak position
US Top LPs (Billboard)	112
US Top Albums (Cashbox)	36
