= Ricky Sings Spirituals =

EP by Ricky Nelson
- Released: February, 1960
- Genre: Gospel
- Length: 10:14
- Label: Imperial
- Producer: Charles "Bud" Dant

Ricky Nelson chronology
Songs by Ricky (1959)	Ricky Sings Spirituals (1960)	More Songs by Ricky (1960)

Ricky Sings Spirituals is an EP by American singer Ricky Nelson. It was released in February 1960 by Imperial Records, and contains four gospel songs. Jimmie Haskell arranged the album and Charles "Bud" Dant produced it.

Nelson's only EP, it was inspired by Elvis Presley's devotion to gospel music. It didn't come from his own religious upbringing, which was nonexistent and may have been Ozzie Nelson's idea (Ozzie wrote one of the songs, even though he didn't practice any organized religion). The EP includes a Baker Knight tune, "Glory Train", but it was a commercial failure and an out-of-character footnote to his fifties rock & roll. According to Nelson, he wasn't trying to copy Presley by recording an EP of spiritual songs, but he understood that he "was welcomed as a cleaned up Elvis."

The EP was released on compact disc by Capitol Records on June 19, 2001, as tracks 21 through 24 on a pairing of two albums on one CD with tracks 1 through 12 consisting of Nelson's Final Studio Imperial Album from March 1962, Album Seven by Rick. Bear Family included also the EP in the 2001 The American Dream box set.

== Reception ==
Professional ratings
Review scores
Source	Rating
AllMusic	3/5 stars

William Ruhlmann of AllMusic said that "the songs were in the style of old-time gospel music…Nelson sang the songs with assurance, but not with the feeling that Presley put into his gospel recordings. As with Nelson's rock & roll performances, his gospel recordings were sincere imitations of music he seemed to like.

Cashbox noted, "He catches the gospel feeling on the fast-moving “March With The Band Of The Lord”, and “Glory Train”

Joel Selvin called it "the strangest record of his career."

== Track listing ==
=== Side one ===
No.	Title	Writer(s)	Length
1.	"Glory Train"	Baker Knight	2:38
2.	"I Bowed My Head in Shame"	Baker Knight	2:32

=== Side two ===
No.	Title	Writer(s)	Length
1.	"March with the Band of the Lord"	Ray Johnson	2:40
2.	"If You Believe It"	Ozzie Nelson	2:16
