= For Your Sweet Love =

Studio album by Rick Nelson
- Released: May 27, 1963
- Genre: Rock and roll
- Length: 27:14
- Label: Decca
- Producer: Charles "Bud" Dant

Rick Nelson chronology
Best Sellers by Rick Nelson (1963)	For Your Sweet Love (1963)	Rick Nelson Sings "For You" (1963)

Singles from For You Sweet Love
- 1. "I Got a Woman" Released: February 27, 1963; 2. "String Along" Released: May 9, 1963

For Your Sweet Love is the eighth studio album by rock and roll and pop idol Rick Nelson and his first for Decca Records. The album was released on May 27, 1963.

It features the singles "I Got a Woman", "You Don't Love Me Anymore (And I Can Tell)", "String Along", and "Gypsy Woman". Nelson also covers Little Peggy March's "I Will Follow You" and a couple of contributions by Dorsey Burnette and Joe Osborn.

The album debuted on the Billboard Top LPs chart in the issue dated June 8, 1963, and remained on the chart for 20 weeks, peaking at number 20. It also debuted on the Cashbox albums chart in the issue dated July 13, 1963, and remained on the chart for a total of 22 weeks, peaking at number 17. Australian pop rock group the Allusions released a cover version of "Gypsy Woman" in March 1966, which peaked at No. 27 on the Australian singles chart.

The album was released on compact disc by Ace Records in 1997 as tracks 1 through 12 on a pairing of two albums on one CD with tracks 12 through 24 consisting of Nelson's 1963 album, Rick Nelson Sings "For You". Bear Family included the album in the 2008 For You: The Decca Years box set.

== Reception ==
Professional ratings
Review scores
Source	Rating
AllMusic	3/5 stars
The Encyclopedia of Popular Music	2/5 stars
Record Mirror	3/5 stars

Richie Unterberger of AllMusic said that "although there would always be some bright spots worth a listen (usually in the form of James Burton solos). The material often recalls, but does not match, his earlier '60s ballads such as "Travelin' Man." "Gypsy Woman" is an uncommonly tough number for the period, and "I Will Follow You" is a decent cover of the Little Peggy March hit "I Will Follow Him."

Billboard described the album as "a Listenable Album", and praised that it features "a flock of other goodies."

Cashbox described the album as a "professional, wide-range voice and distinctive style carries him in good stead."

Variety gave the album a positive reviews, notes "Nelson handles 'em with a savvy of the youthful tastes and desires"

Record Mirror described the album as "a fine album in Rick Nelson in typical style"

The Evening Independent described the album as "a well-balanced program."

== Track listing ==
=== Side one ===
No.	Title	Writer(s)	Length
1.	"For Your Sweet Love"	Jerry Fuller	2:17
2.	"Gypsy Woman"	Dorsey Burnette, Joe Osborn	2:34
3.	"You Don't Love Me Anymore (And I Can Tell)"	Nicollet Tady	2:03
4.	"Everytime I See You Smiling"	Dorsey Burnette, Joe Osborn	1:58
5.	"Pick Up the Pieces"	Hal David, Sherman Edwards	2:10
6.	"String Along"	Bobby Doyle, Jimmy Duncan	2:22

=== Side two ===
No.	Title	Writer(s)	Length
1.	"One Boy Too Late"	Ellie Greenwich, Tony Powers	2:08
2.	"Everytime I Think About You"	Claude Demetrius	2:43
3.	"Let's Talk the Whole Thing Over"	Mike McCaffrey	2:00
4.	"I Got a Woman"	Ray Charles	2:25
5.	"What Comes Next?"	Jerry Crutchfield	2:08
6.	"I Will Follow You"	Franck Pourcel, Paul Mauriat, Arthur Altman, Norman Gimbel	2:08

== Personnel ==
- Guitar: James Burton, Rick Nelson
- Bass: Joe Osborn
- Drums: Richie Frost
- Piano: Ray Johnson

== Charts ==
=== Album ===
Chart (1963)	Peak position
U.S. Top LPs (Billboard)	20
U.S. Cashbox	17

=== Singles ===
Year	Title	U.S. Hot 100	U.S. Cashbox
1963	I Got a Woman	49	58
1963	You Don't Love Me Anymore (And I Can Tell)	47	48
1963	String Along	25	17
1963	Gypsy Woman	62	91
