= Rick Is 21 =

Studio album by Rick Nelson
- Released: May 8, 1961
- Recorded: 1960−61
- Studios: United Western (Hollywood, California)
- Genres: Rock and roll; rockabilly
- Length: 27:41
- Label: Imperial
- Producer: Charles "Bud" Dant

Rick Nelson chronology
More Songs by Ricky (1960)	Rick Is 21 (1961)	Album Seven by Rick (1962)

Singles from Rick Is 21
- 1. "Travelin' Man" / "Hello Mary Lou" Released: April 1961

Rick Is 21 is the sixth studio album by rock and roll and pop idol Rick Nelson and was released on May 8, 1961, by Imperial Records. The album was almost entirely recorded in Los Angeles, California, United States at the famous United Western Recorders studios from February to April 1961. it features songs by Dorsey Burnette, Jerry Fuller, Gene Pitney, Johnny Rivers and Dave Burgess. Only one song was recorded at Master Recorders studios in Hollywood, California, United States. That song, "Do You Know What it Means to Miss New Orleans", was recorded in February 1960. The album was the first to credit his first name as "Rick"; previous albums were credited to Ricky Nelson. Jimmie Haskell was the arranger and Charles "Bud" Dant was the producer.

== Charts ==
The album debuted on the Billboard Top LPs chart in the issue dated May 29, 1961, and remained on the chart for 49 weeks, peaking at number eight. It reached number six on the Cashbox albums chart where stayed there for 45 weeks. Successful singles from the album include "Travelin' Man" and "Hello Mary Lou"

"Travelin' Man," made its debut on the Billboard Hot 100 chart on April 24, 1961, eventually spending two weeks at number one during its 14-week stay. on the Cashbox singles weeks it spent three weeks at number one during its 18-week stay. and number two in The U.K during its 18-week stay. Its B-side, "Hello Mary Lou" reached number nine on the Hot 100 during its 15-week stay, number two in The U.K during its 18-weeks stay. and number nine on the Cashbox single charts during its 16-weeks stay.

== Other releases ==
The album was released on compact disc by Capitol Records on June 19, 2001, as tracks 19 through 30 on a pairing of two albums on one CD with tracks 1 through 12 consisting of Nelson's 1960 album, More Songs by Ricky. In 2001, Bear Family included the album in The American Dream box set. Rick is 21 was included in a box set entitled Four Classic Albums Plus Box Set, which contains all 4 of his studio albums, and was released on July 1, 2016.

== Reception ==
Professional ratings
Review scores
Source	Rating
AllMusic	4/5 stars
The Encyclopedia of Popular Music	2/5 stars
New Record Mirror	4/5

William Ruhlmann of AllMusic said that Nelson "returned to a modified rock sound, bringing in new writers like Jerry Fuller and Gene Pitney, and coming up with a streamlined pop/rock approach but the rest of the album is guitar rock arrangements of songs written by old hand Dorsey Burnette ("My One Desire"), contributing the excellent rocker "Break My Chain" (complete with a terrific James Burton guitar solo), but the overall quality of the material is high, and Nelson's band plays it well.

Billboard described the album as "a tribute to his reaching his majority" Cashbox wrote "it features a fine teen oriented treatments of 'Stars Fell On Alabama,' [and] 'That Warm Summer Night'. Jimmy Watson of New Record Mirror described the album as "entertaining".

== Track listing ==
1. "My One Desire" (Dorsey Burnette) – 2:14
2. "That Warm Summer Night" (Jerry Fuller) – 2:11
3. "Break My Chain" (Jerry Fuller) – 1:53
4. "Do You Know What It Means to Miss New Orleans?" (Louis Alter, Eddie DeLange) – 2:32
5. "I'll Make Believe" (Johnny Rivers) – 2:18
6. "Travelin' Man" (Jerry Fuller) – 2:12
7. "Oh Yeah, I'm in Love" (Gregory Carroll, Doris Payne) – 2:08
8. "Everybody But Me" (Dave Burgess) – 2:11
9. "Lucky Star" (Dave Burgess) – 2:17
10. "Sure Fire Bet" (Gene Pitney) –2:07
11. "Stars Fell on Alabama" (Mitchell Parish, Frank Perkins) – 2:34
12. "Hello Mary Lou" (Gene Pitney) – 2:17

== Charts ==
=== Album ===
Chart (1961)	Peak position
U.S. Top LPs (Billboard)	8
U.S. Cashbox	6

=== Singles ===
Year	Title	U.S. Hot 100	U.S. Cashbox	UK Singles
1961	"Hello Mary Lou"	9	9	2
1961	"Travelin' Man"	1	1	2
