= Lucky Stars (disambiguation) =

Lucky Stars is a Hong Kong action comedy film series in the 1980s and 1990s.

Lucky Stars can also refer to:

- Lucky Stars (album), a 2015 album by Don McGlashan
- The Lucky Stars, a 2005 Chinese TV drama series
- "Lucky Stars" (song) by Dean Friedman, 1978

== See also ==
- Lucky Star (disambiguation)
- Thank Your Lucky Stars (disambiguation)
