= Digger Revell and the Denvermen =

Australian rock and roll band (1961–1965)

- Also known as: Digger Revell's Denver Men, The Denvermen
- Origin: Sydney, Australia
- Genres: Rock 'n' roll, instrumental surf
- Years active: 1961–1965
- Labels: His Master's Voice; RCA; Canetoad
- Past members: Digger Revell (né Gary Hildred); Phil Bower; Peter Burbidge; Allan Crowe; Les Green; Tex Ihasz; Kenny Kramer; Frank Kennington; Mick Liber

Digger Revell and the Denvermen were an Australian rock 'n' roll and instrumental surf band, which formed in 1961. Lead singer Digger Revell (né Gary Hildred, 1943) was joined by the Denvermen, Phil Bower on drums, Allan Crowe on bass guitar, Les Green on lead guitar and Tex Ihasz on rhythm guitar. They had top 40 hits on the Kent Music Report singles chart with "Surfside", "Blue Mountains", "Avalon Stomp" (all 1963) and "My Little Rocker's Turned Surfie" (1964). The group disbanded in 1965 and Revell had a solo career.

== History ==
=== Early years ===
Gary Benjamin Hildred, was born in Dubbo in July 1943. When living in Sydney, one of his neighbours was rock musician Warren Williams. Hildred began his rock 'n' roll career as Digger Revell in 1958, by singing at Williams' suburban dances. From 1959 Revell appeared on Sydney TV shows. He formed Digger Revell and the Lonely Ones as a rock 'n' roll band.

=== Digger Revell and the Denvermen ===
Digger Revell and the Denvermen were formed in Sydney in 1961 by Digger Revell on lead vocals, Phil Bower on drums, Peter Burbidge on saxophone, Allan Crowe on bass guitar, Les Green on lead guitar and Tex Ihasz on rhythm guitar. The members came from two rock 'n' roll bands, Paul Dever and the Denvermen and Digger Revell and the Lonely Ones. During their first year they performed four nights a week at dances and appeared on Sydney-based TV shows.

Their debut single, "Outback" (1962), although an instrumental, was credited to Digger Revell's Denver Men. Green was an Australian pioneer guitarist, he used an effects box and echo chamber per Hank Marvin and Duane Eddy. "Surfside" (1963), the second single, was co-written by New Zealand-born Johnny Devlin and American Nat Kipner, who were both living in Australia. It reached No. 1 in Sydney, No. 6 in Melbourne and No. 17 on the Kent Music Report singles chart (back calculated). Devlin became their manager, songwriter and producer as well as continuing his own performance career. Burbidge left in 1963. The Denvermen had two other top 40 singles in that year, "Blue Mountains" and "Avalon Stomp".

The Denvermen also backed other artists, "Stomp the Tumbarumba" by Johnny Devlin (November 1963) and "The Hootenanny Stomp" by Tony Weston with the Denvermen (1963). Their only top 40 hit in 1964, "My Little Rocker's Turned Surfie", was their last charting surf music single. They continued issuing singles into 1965 having adopted a mod-style and sound but none reached the top 100. "Bird Dog" (1965) was the Denvermen's vocal cover version of the Everley Brothers song without Revell. In May of that year Crowe was replaced by Kenny Kramer on bass guitar (ex-Bluedogs). The last single by Digger Revell and the Denvermen was a cover version of Jerry Lee Lewis' "High School Confidential". Revell left to pursue his solo career and was replaced by Frank Kennington on lead vocals. Green left soon after and was replaced by Mick Liber on guitar. The Denvermen's final single, "I Can Tell", was issued in that year on His Master's Voice but the group disbanded.

=== Afterwards ===
After leaving the Denvermen Green joined the Sundowners. Kennington and Liber were founding members of rock band Python Lee Jackson in December 1965. Revell's solo single, "You've Got What It Takes", was released in 1966, which was middle of the road (MOR) pop music. It reached No. 38 on the Go-Set National Top 40 singles chart. He issued further singles until 1967. In late 1967 and early 1968 he performed for Royal Australian Air Force (RAAF) personnel during the Vietnam War at Vũng Tàu Air Base. Also in that year Terry Hearne on lead guitar and vocals (ex-the Allusions) joined Revell's backing band.

Revell toured to Vietnam 11 times between 1967 and 1972. In the early 1980s Revell was a country music artist, he released an album, Alive and Kicking (September 1982) and an associated single, "The World's Gone Crazy". As from October 2023 Revell was performing on the nostalgia circuit as the Good Old Days of Rock'n'roll, with fellow veterans, Little Pattie, Dinah Lee and Lucky Starr.

== Members ==
- Digger Revell (né Gary Hildred) – lead vocals (1961–1965)
- Phil Bower – drums (1961–1965)
- Peter Burbidge – saxophone (1961–1963)
- Allan Crowe – bass guitar (1961–1965)
- Les Green – lead guitar (1961–1965)
- Tex Ihasz – rhythm guitar (1961–1965)
- Kenny Kramer – bass guitar (1965)
- Frank Kennington – lead vocals (1965)
- Mick Liber – lead guitar (1965)

== Discography ==
=== Albums ===
- Let's Go Surfside (by the Denvermen) (1963) – RCA (101537)

“My prayer” (by digger revell and the denvermen) (October 1965) - RCA (101627)

Digger Revell (solo)

“To whom it may concern” (November 1966) - RCA Camden

- Alive and Kicking (September 1982) – RCA (CML 001)

=== Extended plays ===
- Surf Side (1963) – His Master's Voice
- Stomp Fever (1964) – RCA

=== Singles ===
- "Outback" (by Digger Revell's Denver Men) (1962) – His Master's Voice
- "Surfside" (by Digger Revell's Denver Men) (1963) – His Master's Voice Aus: No. 17
- "Blue Mountains" (by the Denver Men) (1963) – His Master's Voice Aus: No. 37
- "Building Castles in the Air" ((by Digger Revell with the Denver Men) (1963) – His Master's Voice Aus: No. 47
- "Avalon Stomp" (by the Denvermen) (1963) – His Master's Voice Aus: No. 25
- "Over the Rainbow" ((by Digger Revell and the Denvermen) (1963) – RCA
- "Stomp Fever" (by the Denvermen) (1963) – RCA Aus: No. 39
- "Stomp the Tumbarumba" by Johnny Devlin) (November 1963) – RCA Aus: No. 23
- "Mystery Wave" (by the Denvermen) (1963) – RCA Aus: No. 74
- "Hootenany Stomp" ((by Tony Weston with the Denver Men) (1963) – RCA
- "My Little Rocker's Turned Surfie" (by Digger Revell and the Denvermen) (1964) – RCA Aus: No. 32
- "The Rebel" (by the Denvermen) (1964) – RCA
- "Just Call Me" (by Digger Revell and the Denvermen) (1964) – RCA Aus: No. 90
- "Don't You Know" (by Digger Revell and the Denvermen) (1964) – RCA
- "Surfers Blues" (by the Denvermen) (1964) – RCA
- "Jenny, Jenny" (by Digger Revell and the Denvermen) (1964) – RCA Aus: No. 71
- "Route No. 1" (by the Denvermen) (1964) – RCA
- "A Shot of Rhythm and Blues" (by Digger Revell and the Denvermen) (1964) – RCA
- "Bird Dog" (by the Denvermen) (1965) – RCA
- "High School Confidential" (by Digger Revell and the Denvermen) (1965) – RCA
- "I Can Tell" (by the Denvermen) (1965) – His Master's Voice

Digger Revell (solo)

- "You've Got What It Takes" (1966) – RCA
- "You Won't Find that Kind in Me" (1966) – RCA Aus Go-Set: No. 38 Aus KMR: No. 48
- "All Our Love is Slipping Away" (1966) – RCA
- "All for the Love of a Girl" (1967) – RCA
- "Funny How Time Slips Away" (1967) – RCA
- "The World's Gone Crazy" (1982) – RCA
