= I Will Follow Him =

- German edition picture sleeve

Single by Little Peggy March

from the album I Will Follow Him
- B-side: "Wind Up Doll"
- Released: January 22, 1963
- Recorded: January 7, 1963
- Studio: RCA Victor, New York City
- Genre: Pop
- Length: 2:25
- Label: RCA Victor
- Songwriters: Franck Pourcel; Paul Mauriat; Arthur Altman; Norman Gimbel
- Producer: Hugo & Luigi

Little Peggy March singles chronology
"Little Me" (1962)	"I Will Follow Him" (1963)	"I Wish I Were a Princess" (1963)

"I Will Follow Him" is a popular song that was first recorded in 1961 by Franck Pourcel, as an instrumental entitled "Chariot". The song achieved its widest success when it was recorded by American singer Little Peggy March with English lyrics on January 7, 1963. The music was written by Franck Pourcel (using the pseudonym J.W. Stole) and Paul Mauriat (using the pseudonym Del Roma). It was adapted by Arthur Altman. The completely new English lyrics were written by Norman Gimbel.

== Instrumental versions ==
The song was first recorded by Franck Pourcel as an instrumental, and was released in 1961 on the European LP Amour, Danse, Et Violons. No.17 and on an EP on the La Voix de son Maître label. Pourcel co-wrote the song with his friend and fellow French bandleader Paul Mauriat. Mauriat later recorded an instrumental version, which he released on his album Paul Mauriat Plays the Hits of 1976.

In 1963, Percy Faith released an instrumental version, re-titled "I Will Follow You", as the lead song on side 1 of his album entitled Themes for Young Lovers. The album spent 28 weeks on Billboard's chart of Top LPs, reaching No. 32, and earned Percy Faith a gold record.

== Petula Clark versions ==
In 1962, Petula Clark released a French-language version of the song, entitled "Chariot" (lyrics by Jacques Plante), which reached No. 1 in Wallonia, No. 2 in France, and No. 8 in Flanders, and earned Clark a gold record. Her English version (the first recording to be entitled "I Will Follow Him") reached No. 4 in Denmark, where it was released by Vogue, but failed to chart in the UK and the US, where it was released by Pye and Laurie respectively. Clark also recorded Italian and German versions of the song, with her Italian version, "Sul mio carro", reaching No. 4 in Italy, and her German version, "Cheerio", reaching No. 6 in West Germany.

== Little Peggy March version ==
On January 7, 1963, 14-year-old singer Little Peggy March recorded a version of "I Will Follow Him" in a performance conducted by Sammy Lowe at RCA Victor Studio A, New York City. RCA Victor released the single (with B-side "Wind-Up Doll") on January 22, 1963. "I Will Follow Him" reached number one on the Hot 100 in the issue of Billboard dated April 27, 1963, spending three weeks at the top during a 14-week chart run. At the age of 15 years and one month, March was (and continues to be) the youngest female artist to top the Hot 100. Her version also reached number one in Australia, Hong Kong, Israel, South Africa and Uruguay, and on Canada's CHUM Hit Parade, New Zealand's "Lever Hit Parade" and Billboard's Hot R&B Singles chart. It ranked number one for the year on WABC in New York City.

The song also reached number one on the Cash Box Top 100, in a tandem ranking of Little Peggy March, Franck Pourcel, Petula Clark, Rosemary Clooney, Betty Curtis, Jackie Kannon, Joe Sentieri, and Georgia Gibbs' versions, with March's version marked as a bestseller. In 1964, the record featured among the nominations for Grammy Award for Best Rock and Roll Recording of 1963, losing to Nino Tempo & April Stevens's cover of "Deep Purple".

In 2011, Peggy March re-recorded "I Will Follow Him" with Dutch singer José Hoebee (who covered this song and reached the number-one spot in the Netherlands and Belgium in 1982). However, it took another year for the release of this new version song, which was eventually released on the German version of March's album Always and Forever.

=== Charts ===
==== Weekly charts ====
Chart (1963)	Peak position
Australia (Music Maker)	1
Canada (CHUM Hit Parade)(4wks)	1
Chile	5
Finland (Ilta-Sanomat)	≥2
Hong Kong	1
Israel (Kol Yisrael)	1
Japan (Utamatic)	≥8
New Zealand (Lever Hit Parade)	1
Peru (La Prensa)	2
Philippines	5
South Africa	1
Sweden (Tio i Topp)	2
Uruguay (Discometro Mundial)	1
US Billboard Hot 100	1
US Billboard Hot R&B Singles	1
West Germany (Musikmarkt)	6

==== Year-end charts ====
Chart (1963)	Rank
South Africa	9
US Billboard Top Records of 1963: Hot 100	20
US Billboard Top R&B Singles for 1963	22
US Cash Box Top 100	6

== Other versions ==
In Italy three versions of the song were in the charts in 1963 (translated/adapted by Vito Pallavicini and Bruno Pallesi): One recorded by Betty Curtis (highest position: No. 3), another version by Petula Clark ("Sul mio carro"; No. 4) and the Franck Pourcel version (No. 5). The song reached No. 1 in Italy's Musica e dischi, in a tandem ranking of these three versions. Curtis's version was also a top 10 hit in Uruguay.

In 1963, Italian singer Ennio Sangiusto released a version of the song "Chariot (La Tierra)", which reached No. 1 in Spain. Also in 1963, Italian singer Joe Sentieri released a version of the song "La Tierra", which reached No. 3 in Argentina.

In 1963, Argentine singer Alberto Cortez released a version of the song "La Tierra (Chariot)", which reached No. 2 in Spain. Also in 1963, Argentine singer Violeta Rivas released a version entitled "La Tierra", which reached No. 1 in Uruguay.

Dee Dee Sharp released a version of the song on her 1963 album Do the Bird. Sharp's version reached No. 1 in Hong Kong.

Rick Nelson recorded a cover for his 1963 album For Your Sweet Love, changing the title and lyrics to "I Will Follow You".

Japanese noise rock band Les Rallizes Dénudés interpolates the song's melody in their song 暗殺者の夜 (Night of the Assassin).

In 1982, Dutch singer José Hoebee (former member of the girl band Luv') released a hit cover of the song, which reached No. 1 in Flanders, No. 1 on the Dutch Top 40, and No. 2 on the Dutch Nationale Hitparade. A 2005 remix reached No. 90 on the Dutch Single Top 100 in early 2006. In 2011, she re-recorded "I Will Follow Him" with Peggy March. This duet appeared on the German edition of March's album Always and Forever.

In 1983, Czech singer Judita Čeřovská recorded a Czech version called Malý vůz; in 1995, another Czech version was recorded by Ilona Csáková, which also included a sample of the English lyrics.

The Norwegian comedian Lars Mjøen wrote comedic Norwegian lyrics, «Torsken kommer!» (translates to «The cod is coming»). The song was published by the comedy troupe KLM as Brødrene Dal as the B-side of "Gaus, Roms Og Brumund" (PolyGram 2052 206) and on the LP record Spektralplate (Polydor 2382 135) in 1982. A music video remake was released by Norges Bank in 2017 to mark the introduction of the new 200 krone banknote that features a cod on the obverse side.

The song is featured at the end of the 1992 film Sister Act, where it was performed by the nuns' chorus for the Pope with Whoopi Goldberg's character as the lead singer. The song peaked at number 53 on the Australian ARIA Singles Chart.

The 1962 Italian language cover of "Chariot (Su mio carro)" by Betty Curtis is featured in the opening sequence of the romantic comedy-drama Pillion (2025). This version also appears in the biographical gangster film Goodfellas (1990), although not published on the CD release of the soundtrack.

In 2000, Cynthia Patag, Nanette Inventor, Malou de Guzman, Beverly Salviejo and Pinky Marquez performed the interactive version of the song at the end of the musical episode of Wansapanataym, "Bata-Okey".
