= Electric High =

Single by Elliot Minor

from the album Solaris
- Released: October 5, 2009
- Recorded: 2009
- Genre: Symphonic rock; pop rock
- Length: 3:21 (single edit); 3:49 (album version)
- Label: Repossession Records
- Songwriter(s): Elliot Minor
- Producer(s): Jim Wirt

Elliot Minor singles chronology
"Time After Time" (2008)	"Electric High" (2009)	"Solaris (Winter Olympics Version)" (2010)

"Electric High" is the second single from Elliot Minor's Solaris album, written by Alex Davies, produced by Jim Wirt, who also worked with Elliot Minor on their debut self-titled album, and mixed by Tom Lord-Alge. Wirt said of the song's recording: "Electric High was a natural ... everything came together immediately! We ended up using the original scratch vocal, and the original guitars, this is what makes this song stand out, nothing contrived about it." It was released on October 5, 2009, charting at #120.

Many consumers had technical problems buying the single from iTunes. iTunes did not resolve the problem in time, and thus iTunes sales were not counted toward the charts.

== Music video ==
The video was filmed in Carling Academy in Newcastle, and features the band performing on a stage with pyrotechnics. It also includes footage from their June–July tour in 2009.

== Track listings ==
=== CD ===
1. "Electric High" (single edit)
2. "Electric High" (acoustic version)

=== Vinyl ===
1. "Electric High" (single edit)
2. "Electric High" (acoustic version)

=== Digital ===
1. "Electric High" (single edit)
2. "Electric High" (acoustic version)
3. "Electric High" (live version)
