= The Allusions =

Australian rock music group (1965–1969)

- Origin: Sydney, New South Wales, Australia
- Genres: Beat pop, rock
- Years active: 1965–1969
- Label: EMI/Parlophone
- Past members: Terry Chapman; Terry Hearne; Kevin Hughes; Michael Morris; John Shaw; Bruce Davis; John Spence

The Allusions were an Australian rock group, which formed in late 1965. They released a self-titled studio album in January 1967 via EMI/Parlophone. Their popular singles were "Gypsy Woman" and "The Dancer" (both 1966), which both peaked in the top 30 on the Kent Music Report national singles chart. The Allusions disbanded in early 1969. Australian musicologist Ian McFarlane observed that they were "one of the most stylish and inventive" of local "1960s beat pop bands."

== History ==
The Allusions were formed in late 1965 in Sydney as a beat pop band by Terry Chapman on bass guitar (ex-the Midnighters), Terry Hearne on lead guitar and vocals (ex-Dave Bridge Trio), Kevin Hughes on drums (ex-the Midnighters), Michael Morris on rhythm guitar and vocals (ex-Dennis Williams and the Delawares) and John Shaw on organ, piano and vocals. Fellow musician Alistair McEwan became their talent manager. Their major influence was the Mersey sound from early to mid-1960s.

The Allusions debut single, "Gypsy Woman" (March 1966), is a cover version of a 1963 album track by Ricky Nelson. It reached No. 8 on Sydney's singles chart, and No. 27 on Kent Music Report singles chart (KMR). Their second single, "The Dancer" (July 1966), was an original written by Morris. It peaked at No. 26 on the Go-Set National Top 40 and No. 25 on KMR. Chapman was replaced on bass guitar by Bruce Davis (Morris's former bandmate) in July 1966.

In January 1967 they released their debut studio album, The Allusions. Australian musicologist Ian McFarlane felt it was "excellent" and the group were "one of the most stylish and inventive of Sydney's 1960s beat pop bands." "Roundabout" (February 1967), another Morris original, is their fourth single, which peaked at No. 39 on Go-Set and No. 45 on KMR. In April of that year they issued a four-track extended play, The Dancer, via EMI/Parlophone. They followed with another Morris-written song as their fifth single, "Seven Days of Rain", in July, which reached No. 67 on KMR. Late that year Morris left and was replaced by John Spence on guitar.

Hearne left the band in October 1968 to join Digger Revell's backing band. Morris rejoined in that month, and the group continued until early 1969 before finally disbanding. Morris travelled overseas before returning to Australia as a country music artist. Australian writer Garry Aurisch, wrote a booklet, The Allusions: An Essay, on the group in 1994. He described them as having been "overlooked by both collectors and writers of Australian pop. Despite recording an album of mostly original songs, the band did not go on to stand out among the many other bands of the time". He felt their album was a "versatile work crammed with intelligently crafted pop songs, most of which are adorned with nifty little guitar solos and carefully thought-out, unobtrusive harmony". Canetoad Records issued a retrospective compilation, The Allusions' Anthology 1966-68, on compact disc in 2003, which included all album tracks, singles and additional recordings.

== Members ==
- Terry Chapman – bass guitar, vocals (1965–1966)
- Terry Hearne – lead guitar, vocals (1965–1968)
- Kevin Hughes – drums (1965–1969)
- Michael Morris – rhythm guitar, vocals (1965–1967, 1968–1969)
- John Shaw – piano, organ, vocals (1965–1969)
- Bruce Davis – bass guitar, vocals (1966–1969)
- John Spence – guitar (1967–1968)

== Discography ==
=== Albums ===
- The Allusions (January 1967) – EMI/Parlophone (PMCO 7540)
- The Allusions' Anthology 1966-68 (2003) – Canetoad (CTCD 033)

=== Extended plays ===
- The Dancer (April 1967) – EMI/Parlophone (GEPO 70038)

=== Singles ===
- "Gypsy Woman" (1966) Aus KMR: No. 27
- "The Dancer" (1966) Aus Go-Set: No. 26, KMR: No. 25
- "Looks Like Trouble" (1966)
- "Roundabout" (1967) Aus Go-Set: No. 39, KMR: No. 45
- "Seven Days of Rain" (1967) Aus KMR: No. 67
- "Mr Love" (1968)
