= MV Lucky Star =

MV Lucky Star is the name of the following ships:

- MV Lucky Star (1960), built as a sailing vessel in 1913, motorized in 1927, first ship to broadcast the Danmarks Commerciale Radio in 1961
- MV Lucky Star (1976), scrapped in 2016

== See also ==
- Lucky Star (disambiguation)
