= My Lucky Star =

My Lucky Star may refer to:

- My Lucky Star (TV series), a Taiwanese drama
- My Lucky Star (novel), a novel by Joe Keenan
- My Lucky Star (1933 film), a UK comedy starring Florence Desmond
- My Lucky Star (1938 film), a film starring Sonja Henie
- My Lucky Star (1963 film), a Hong Kong film featuring Tien Feng
- My Lucky Star (2003 film), a Hong Kong film starring Tony Leung Chiu-Wai
- My Lucky Star (2013 film), a Chinese film produced by and starring Zhang Ziyi
- "My Lucky Star", a song from the Broadway musical Follow Thru
- My Lucky Stars, a 1985 Hong Kong action-comedy film starring Jackie Chan

== See also ==
- Lucky Star (disambiguation)
- "You Are My Lucky Star", a song from the 1952 film Singin' in the Rain
