= Again (1949 song) =

1949 song

Song
- Released: 1949
- Genre: Popular
- Composer: Lionel Newman
- Lyricist: Dorcas Cochran

"Again" is a popular song with music by Lionel Newman and words by Dorcas Cochran. It first appeared in the film Road House (1948), sung by Ida Lupino. An instrumental rendition was used in the movie Pickup on South Street (1953). By 1949, versions by Vic Damone, Doris Day, Tommy Dorsey, Gordon Jenkins, Vera Lynn, Art Mooney, and Mel Tormé all made the Billboard charts.

== Doris Day cover ==
The recording by Doris Day was recorded in February 1949 and released by Columbia Records as catalog number 38467. The flip side was "Everywhere You Go". It first reached the Billboard magazine Best Seller chart on May 13, 1949, and lasted 19 weeks on the chart, peaking at #2.

== Vic Damone cover ==
The recording by Vic Damone was recorded in February 1949 and released by Mercury Records as catalog number 5261. The flip side was "I Love You So Much It Hurts". It first reached the Billboard magazine Best Seller chart on April 8, 1949, and lasted 15 weeks on the chart, peaking at #11. Other sources give the highest chart position as #6.

== Tommy Dorsey cover ==
The recording by Tommy Dorsey and his orchestra was released by RCA Victor Records as catalog number 20-3427. It first reached the Billboard magazine Best Seller chart on June 10, 1949, and lasted 9 weeks on the chart, peaking at #22. Other sources give the highest chart position as #6. The flip side, "The Hucklebuck", also charted.

== Gordon Jenkins cover ==
The recording by Gordon Jenkins and his orchestra was made on February 17, 1949, and released by Decca Records as catalog number 24602. The flip side was "Skip to My Lou". It first reached the Billboard magazine Best Seller chart on April 15, 1949, and lasted 23 weeks on the chart, peaking at #2.

== Vera Lynn ==
The recording by Vera Lynn, backed by Bob Farnon's orchestra, was released by London Records November, 1948 as catalog number 310. It first reached the Billboard magazine Best Seller chart on January 21, 1949, and lasted 3 weeks on the chart, peaking at #23. The B side was Lavender's Blue.

== Art Mooney cover ==
The recording by Art Mooney and his orchestra was made on March 7, 1949, and released by MGM Records as catalog number 10398. The flip side was "Five Foot Two". It first reached the Billboard magazine Best Seller chart on July 15, 1949, at #28, its only week on the chart. Other sources give the highest chart position as #7.

== Mel Tormé cover ==
"Again"

Single by Mel Tormé
- B-side: "Blue Moon"
- Released: 1949
- Recorded: 1949
- Genre: Jazz
- Length: 3:13
- Label: Capitol
- Songwriters: Lionel Newman, Dorcas Cochran

Mel Tormé singles chronology
"Careless Hands" (1949)	"Again" (1949)	"The Four Winds and the Seven Seas" (1949)

The recording by Mel Tormé was released by Capitol Records as catalog number 15428. It first reached the Billboard magazine Best Seller chart on April 8, 1949, and lasted 18 weeks on the chart, peaking at #7. Other sources give the highest chart position as #3. The flip side, "Blue Moon", also charted.

== Other recorded versions ==
- Ricky Nelson from the album More Songs by Ricky (1960). Nelson also performs the song in the 1960 episode of The Adventures of Ozzie and Harriet entitled "A Trap for Ricky" (S08•E19).
- Dinah Washington from the album The Two of Us (1960).
- Erroll Garner from the album Erroll Garner Plays Misty (1955).
- The Four Freshmen – Voices In Latin (1958).
- Tom Jones and Sondra Locke (duet) (The Tom Jones Show TV, 1981, and past – "Tom Jones – Duets" 1999, CD Album, UK Label: Point Entertainment)
- The Lettermen – included on the album Jim, Tony and Bob. (1962).
- Nat King Cole (1958) – appears on the compilation album Looking Back (1965) and on the compilation album Stardust: The Complete Capitol Recordings 1955-1959 (2006).
- Vera Lynn (new version, released as a single) (1960)
- Frank Sinatra – CD boxed set "A Voice in Time" features a live 1949 recording from his radio show.
- Clive Wayne, song with orchestra Conductor: Bruce Campbell. Recorded in London on July 7, 1949. It was released by EMI on its His Master's Voice label as catalog number B 9802.
- Pat Boone – for his album Moonglow (1960).
