= Road House (1948 film) =

1948 film by Jean Negulesco

- Theatrical release poster
- Directed by: Jean Negulesco
- Screenplay by: Edward Chodorov
- Story by: Margaret Gruen; Oscar Saul
- Produced by: Edward Chodorov
- Starring: Ida Lupino; Cornel Wilde; Celeste Holm; Richard Widmark
- Cinematography: Joseph LaShelle
- Edited by: James B. Clark
- Music by: Cyril J. Mockridge (as Cyril Mockridge)
- Color process: Black and white
- Production company: 20th Century Fox
- Distributed by: 20th Century Fox
- Release date: November 4, 1948
- Running time: 95 minutes
- Country: United States
- Language: English
- Box office: $2,350,000 (US rentals)

Road House is a 1948 American film noir drama film directed by Jean Negulesco, with cinematography by Joseph LaShelle. The picture features Ida Lupino, Cornel Wilde, Celeste Holm and Richard Widmark.

The drama tells the story of Lily Stevens (Lupino) who takes a job as a singer at a roadhouse —complete with a bowling alley. When Lily rebuffs the owner Jefty (Widmark) in favor of his boyhood friend Pete Morgan (Wilde), problems begin. They only get worse when Jefty is rejected after proposing to Lily, causing him to go into a murderous rage.

Lupino sings the classic Harold Arlen / Johnny Mercer song "One for My Baby (and One More for the Road)" in the film. The song "Again", written by Dorcas Cochran (words) and Lionel Newman (music), debuted in this film, and was also sung by her.

== Plot ==
Pete Morgan manages Jefty's Road House for his longtime friend, Jefferson "Jefty" Robbins, who inherited the place from his father. Jefty is attracted to Lily Stevens, his new singer from Chicago, but Pete thinks she is just another in a long string of girls he will eventually have to send on her way when Jefty tires of her. For his part, however, Jefty is convinced that Lily is "different", even though she is playing hard to get.

Although Pete tries to pay Lily off and put her on a train, she refuses to leave and makes a successful debut at the club, accompanying herself on piano. Jefty asks Pete to teach Lily how to bowl in the roadhouse's alley, but she shows little interest in the sport and quite a bit more in Pete.

Susie Smith, the club's cashier who is fond of Pete, becomes jealous of Lily. Before Jefty leaves on a hunting trip, he tells Lily that she is not like any other girl he has ever met. Lily tries to join Pete for a boat ride on a lake, but he refuses as she is "Jefty's girl." Lily disputes that notion, so Pete arranges to pick her up later. Susie also goes along, although the women's friendship is decidedly frosty. Later, Pete comes to Lily's rescue when a drunk causes a scene at the club.

Lily and Pete share a passionate kiss. Pete is attracted to her, and it is obvious she feels the same way. Their idyll is interrupted when Jefty shows Pete a marriage license he has obtained in his and Lily's names. Pete tells Jefty that he and Lily are planning to be married. Jefty throws him out. Lily and Pete decide to leave the roadhouse together and he leaves a note stating that he has taken $600 owed to him.

At the railroad station, two policemen detain Pete and Lily. Jefty claims that the entire week's receipts have been taken from the roadhouse's safe, but Pete insists he took only $600. After Susie states that the receipts totaled $2,600, Pete is held for trial and Lily accuses Jefty of framing him.

Pete is tried and found guilty of grand larceny. Before sentencing, Jefty talks to the judge in private and persuades him to parole Pete into his custody. The judge announces that Pete will be on probation for two years, but will have his job back and will be obligated to repay Jefty from his paycheck. Pete and Lily realize that Jefty has them trapped.

Jefty plans a trip to his hunting cabin. Pete wants to flee via the Canada–US border, which is only fifteen miles from the road house but Lily refuses to go along, convincing Pete that Jefty wants the two of them to argue and for Pete to run away. At his cabin, Jefty taunts Pete and Lily while fooling around with a rifle. Lily accuses Jefty of taking the missing money, so Jefty hits her. Pete retaliates by knocking him out. Lily decides that she will go with Pete to Canada, which is now only about two miles through the woods and across a stream, and they set off on foot. Susie, meanwhile, discovers a deposit envelope for the receipts in Jefty's coat pocket, proof of Pete's innocence and Jefty's false testimony. She follows and finds the couple. As she gives the envelope to Pete, Susie is shot in the arm by a pursuing Jefty.

At the foggy lakeside, Pete starts up the motor on Jefty's boat and sends it off empty. After Jefty wastes bullets shooting at the boat, Pete tries to grab his gun. Lily gets possession of it and shoots Jefty when he threatens to hit her with a boulder. As Jefty dies, he reminds Pete that he once told him that Lily was "different." Dawn breaks as Pete, Lily and Susie (in Pete's arms) head out of the woods and back to civilization, to a subdued arrangement of Lionel Newman's "Again."

== Cast ==
- Ida Lupino as Lily Stevens
- Cornel Wilde as Pete Morgan
- Celeste Holm as Susie Smith
- Richard Widmark as Jefferson T. 'Jefty' Robbins
- O.Z. Whitehead as Arthur
- Robert Karnes as Mike
- George Beranger as Lefty
- Ian MacDonald as Police Captain
- Grandon Rhodes as Judge

== Reception ==
=== Critical response ===
Contemporary response lauded the increasingly honed talents of Richard Widmark as a "cinematically anti-social" actor with a specialty for psychotic villains, and noted Ida Lupino's on-screen singing debut with praise.

Modern response has continued praise for the film, which Leonard Maltin described as an "entertaining melodrama." Writer Spencer Selby calls the film an "interesting melodrama that has a crisp forties look and slowly builds to a noirish climax." Film critic Blake Lucas says the film "impresses first of all with its sharp dialogue exchanges between the characters and the bizarre look of the interiors," referring to the at once modern and rustic road house.

The film holds a critic score of 86% on Rotten Tomatoes, based on 14 reviews.
