= All Along (song) =

Song by Elliot Minor

from the album Solaris
- Released: October 19, 2009
- Recorded: 2009
- Genre: Symphonic rock; pop rock; classical
- Length: 4:38
- Label: Repossession Records
- Songwriter(s): Elliot Minor
- Producer(s): Jim Wirt

"All Along" is a song from Elliot Minor's Solaris album, written by Alex Davies and produced by Jim Wirt, who also worked with Elliot Minor on their debut self-titled album. The song is a piano ballad featuring vocal harmonizing by Alex Davies and Ed Minton. This track was not released as a single.

== Music video ==
A video was filmed in a desert and at the Salton Sea at Riverside County, two hours outside of Los Angeles, California. It was made by Tyler Swain from Los Angeles, a friend of the band. The video features the actress Klementine Mellin.

== History ==
Lead singer and guitarist Alex Davies recorded the piano for the song at Abbey Road Studios in 2009.
