= Thank Your Lucky Stars =

Thank Your Lucky Stars may refer to:

- Thank Your Lucky Stars (film), a 1943 film
- Thank Your Lucky Stars (TV series), a British television programme
- Thank Your Lucky Stars (Whitehouse album), a 1990 album by the British band Whitehouse
- Thank Your Lucky Stars (Beach House album), a 2015 album by American dream pop band Beach House
- "Thank Your Lucky Star", a song by Labi Siffre from The Singer and the Song
