= Lucky Star (Gene Vincent song) =

Single by Gene Vincent
- Released: December 1961
- Recorded: October 1961
- Label: USA Capitol
- Songwriter: Dave Burgess

"Lucky Star" is a 1961 song by Dave Burgess, first recorded by Rick Nelson and later by Gene Vincent.

The tune was written by Dave Burgess of the Champs, an old friend of Vincent's who now ran Five Star Music and Challenge Records. It is no relation to the 1957 "Lucky Star" song by Marvin Rainwater. The lyrics commence as follows:

Lucky star shine on me, Lucky star don't you see, I need your light shinin' bright, To win her love for me tonight..

== Rick Nelson version ==
The song was first recorded by Rick Nelson who had covered several of Dave Burgess' songs from 1957 onwards, with Burgess philosophical about the more commercial success Nelson had with Burgess' songs than he himself. Nelson's track, which featured background vocals by Dave Burgess, Glen Campbell and Jerry Fuller, was released on his 1961 album Rick Is 21 on Imperial Records. In 1964 it was released as a single and reached #127 on Billboard's Bubbling Under chart. On January 11, 1962, Nelson sang the song on The Adventures of Ozzie & Harriet episode "Backyard Pet Show".

== Gene Vincent version ==
Vincent's version of Burgess' song occurred after Vincent was forced to cancel the remainder of a UK tour after collapsing in Glasgow and then, after two days in the Glasgow Royal Infirmary, collapsing again in Rumford and being flown home. Vincent's first return to work after this incident was a low-pressure session in October 1961 at the Capitol Studios in Hollywood with Burgess and his band. Dave Burgess was an old friend, who was in The Champs when they'd toured with the Blue Caps. Lucky Star and the B-Side – a cover version of Clyde Pitts' "Baby Don't Believe Him", which Pitts also released in 1961 – were the result of the session. The track was released as a single in the fifth week of November 1961. It was his last USA Capitol single. In March 1962 Vincent was back in the UK touring with Brenda Lee and included the new song "Lucky Star" in a set consisting mainly of older hits. The song has been reissued on several compilation albums including A Portrait of Gene Vincent and Gene Vincent's 20 Greatest. Coincidentally Vincent was the first American to appear on the show Thank Your Lucky Stars.
