= The White One Is Evil =

Single by Elliot Minor

from the album Elliot Minor
- Released: 29 October 2007
- Genre: Symphonic rock; pop rock; classical
- Length: 4:29 / 3:39 (radio edit)
- Label: Repossession Records
- Songwriters: Alex Davies, Ed Minton

Elliot Minor singles chronology
"Jessica" (2007)	"The White One Is Evil" (2007)	"Still Figuring Out" (2008)

Additional covers
- CD 2

Alternative cover
- CD 3

"The White One Is Evil" is the third single from York-based rock band Elliot Minor. It was released on 29 October 2007.

Alex Davies wrote the music, with lyrics by Alex and Ed Minton.

== Music video ==
The video, directed by Corin Hardy, shows the band playing in an eerie woodland late at night with macabre characters. Two of the characters hold a chest from which another appears, a woman with a horse's head, followed by a bright, desert-like setting where Alex Davies (lead vocals) plays while a winged woman dances around him, with the two hunchbacked characters also present. A meal then takes place between the woman, who no longer wears the horse's head but a mask, and a masked man. The two hunchbacks then return and take her away. The band is then seen playing again, and the video brightens while Alex plays the end melody on a grand piano. In the extended version of the video, the studio the video has been filmed in can be seen as the camera pans out.

The video uses the radio edit of the song; the album includes the song in its entirety.

== Chart position ==
"The White One Is Evil" reached number 24 in the mid-week chart position but climbed no higher, and by the Official Chart Show, was announced at number 27. By the following week, it had dropped to number 64.

== Track listings ==
CD 1

1. "The White One Is Evil"

CD 2

1. "The White One Is Evil"
2. "So Here We Are" (demo)
3. "Now She's Gone" (demo)

Vinyl

1. "The White One Is Evil"
2. "So Here We Are" (demo)
3. "Now She's Gone" (demo)
