= Solaris (Elliot Minor album) =

Studio album by Elliot Minor
- Released: 19 October 2009
- Recorded: March–September 2009, Chapel Studios, Lincolnshire; Abbey Road, London; Fourth Street Recording, Santa Monica; Mavehole Studios, York; Mid City Sound, Los Angeles; The Yard, London; South Beach Studios, Miami; Alpha Centauri, London
- Genre: Symphonic rock; pop rock; classical
- Length: 50:02
- Label: Repossession; Dreamusic
- Producer: Jim Wirt

Elliot Minor chronology
Elliot Minor (2008)	Solaris (2009)	Solaris Acoustic (2010)

Singles from Solaris
- 1. "Discover (Why the Love Hurts)" Released: 3 April 2009; 2. "Electric High" Released: 5 October 2009; 3. "I Believe" Released: 11 July 2010

Solaris is the second studio album from the English pop rock band Elliot Minor. Solaris was released on 19 October 2009 in all territories except Japan, where it was released several months later on 21 April 2010 with additional bonus tracks. It was the last album released by the band before their indefinite hiatus in late 2010.

== Recording ==
The band started recording their second album in 2009 after a brief break after touring commitments for the debut album were finished. Alex Davies stated in an interview about writing for this album "I had heard about the pressures of a second album on the songwriter and I can assure you it is true, you have all your life to write your first album and months to write your second. Fortunately I had a load of melodies running around my head and lyric ideas that pulled from the changes in my life over the years that Elliot Minor was formed till now. The majority of the songs are uplifting as I was being positive in a pretty tough year to work through and the others are more personal and intimate". Recording took place across Los Angeles, Miami, London (including the famous Abbey Road Studios), and their hometown of York.

== Promotion ==
The band released "Discover (Why the Love Hurts)" in April 2009, before the album had been formally unveiled as a teaser, before going on to release "Solaris" and "Electric High" before the album was released in October 2009. The final single from the album was "I Believe" released in July 2010. The single version of "Solaris" was a different version than the one that would appear on the album. There was some technical difficulties with the release of "Solaris" which caused promotion to stall and encouraged the band to record and release an acoustic version as an apology. "Electric High" then became the lead single with a music video sent out but the release was again plagued by technical difficulties which caused more problems for the bands charting positions.

The album was supported by the Satellites Tour in 2010, and an acoustic version of the album which was recorded and bundled with a Kerrang! Live Special DVD which also featured some cover versions that the band had been playing.

== Reception ==
The album debuted at number 73 on the UK Albums Chart and number nine on the UK Indie Albums Chart, a decline in chart position from their debut album.

== Track listing ==
Solaris track listing
No.	Title	Writer(s)	Length
1.	"The Dancer"	Alex Davies	3:09
2.	"I Believe"	Davies	4:26
3.	"Electric High"	Davies	3:49
4.	"Coming Home"	Davies, Ed Minton	5:08
5.	"Carry On"	Davies, Minton	4:14
6.	"Solaris"	Davies	3:42
7.	"Better Than the Courtroom"	Davies	4:11
8.	"All Along"	Davies	4:39
9.	"Discover (Why the Love Hurts)"	Davies	3:27
10.	"Shiver"	Davies	4:18
11.	"Tethered"	Davies, Andrew McMahon	4:25
12.	"Let's Turn This Back Around"	Davies, Minton	4:33

Japanese edition
No.	Title	Writer(s)	Length
13.	"Jacky Jules"	Davies, Minton	3:04
14.	"Solaris" (single version)	Davies	3:11
15.	"Solaris" (acoustic)	Davies	3:24

== Personnel ==
Elliot Minor

- Alex Davies – lead vocals, guitar, keyboards, violin, strings/choral/orchestral arrangements, songwriter
- Ed Minton – vocals, guitar, violin
- Dan Hetherton – drums, backing vocals
- Ed Hetherton – bass, cello
- Ali Paul – keyboards, synthesizer

Additional personnel

- Jim Wirt – producer, engineer, bass guitar, backing vocals
- John Greatwood – mixer (all except tracks 2, 3, 14), engineer
- Jeff Hannan – mixing engineer
- Eric Pham – assistant engineer
- Ethan Schmidt – assistant engineer
- Max Coane – engineer
- James Mirabal – assistant engineer

== Charts ==
Chart performance for Solaris
Chart (2009)	Peak position
Scottish Albums (OCC)	62
UK Albums (OCC)	73
UK Independent Albums (OCC)	9
