= Still Figuring Out =

Single by Elliot Minor

from the album Elliot Minor
- Released: 28 January 2008
- Genre: Symphonic rock; pop rock; classical
- Length: 3:29
- Label: Repossession Records
- Songwriter(s): Alex Davies, Ed Minton

Elliot Minor singles chronology
| "The White One Is Evil" (2007) | "Still Figuring Out" (2008) | "Parallel Worlds" (2008) |

"Still Figuring Out" is the fourth single from British rock band Elliot Minor, taken from their top 10 album Elliot Minor. The song was released on the 28 January 2008.

The music was written by Alex Davies, with lyrics by Alex and Ed Minton. The song was written during Alex and Ed's last year of school, in which they were unsure of their future.

The band performed this song at Children In Need in Wales, in November 2007 and moments after announced it as their fourth single. It reached number 17 in its first week - making it the band's highest charting single to date.

== Music video ==
The music video, directed by Frank Borin, was shot in December 2007 and is based in an abandoned house with the band performing on a grand staircase. They are surrounded by teenagers partying around them. The band put out a casting call to street team members to appear as the party-goers in the video.

== Track listings ==
CD

1. "Still Figuring Out"

Vinyl 1 - features logo picture on one side and cover art on other, and also includes a poster

1. "Still Figuring Out"
2. "Etching"

Vinyl 2 - features cover art on one side and lyrics on other, and also includes a poster

1. "Still Figuring Out"
2. "Sometimes You Are Wrong" (demo)

Download

1. "Still Figuring Out" (acoustic)
2. "Still Figuring Out" ("film score" version)

== Chart performance ==
"Still Figuring Out" entered the UK Singles Chart at number 17. This is the band's highest charting single so far in their career.

The next week it went down 21 places to number 38.
