= Jessica (Elliot Minor song) =

Single by Elliot Minor

from the album Elliot Minor
- Released: August 6, 2007
- Genre: Symphonic rock; pop rock; classical
- Length: 3:12
- Label: Repossession Records
- Songwriters: Alex Davies, Ed Hetherton, Ed Minton
- Producer: Jim Wirt

Elliot Minor singles chronology
"Parallel Worlds" (2007)	"Jessica" (2007)	"The White One Is Evil" (2007)

"Jessica" is the second single from York-based rock band Elliot Minor, released on August 6, 2007. The band wrote this song, originally called "Walk With Me", from their affection for Jessica Alba.

This was both Elliot Minor's breakthrough single, and was one of the most popular singles during that period.

The music was written by Alex Davies, with lyrics by Davies, Ed Minton, and Dan Hetherton.

== Music video ==
In the music video, the band plays in the crypt of a church, dressed in black clothing. The video starts and ends with a shot of Alex Davies' (lead vocals, guitar) eye opening and closing.

== Track listings ==
=== Digital ===
1. "Jessica" - 3:12
2. "Jessica" (alternative/dance version) - 3:03
3. "Jessica" (piano/acoustic version) - 2:59
4. "Jessica" (Dark Angel version) - 2:55

=== CD ===
==== CD 1 ====
1. "Jessica" - 3:14
2. "Forgetting You" - 3:13

==== CD 2 ====
1. "Jessica" - 3:14
2. "Breaking" (demo)
3. "Another Morning" (demo)

=== Vinyl ===
==== Side 1 ====
1. "Jessica" - 3:14

==== Side 2 ====
1. "Forgetting You" - 3:13

== Charts ==
Year	UK	UK Indie
2007	19	1
