= Parallel Worlds (song) =

Single by Elliot Minor

from the album Elliot Minor
- Released: April 9, 2007 (original); April 7, 2008 (re-release)
- Recorded: 2006
- Genre: Symphonic rock; pop rock; classical
- Length: 2:56
- Label: Repossession, Warner Bros.
- Songwriter(s): Alex Davies, Ed Minton
- Producer(s): Jim Wirt

Elliot Minor singles chronology
"Parallel Worlds" (2007)	"Jessica" (2007)

Elliot Minor singles chronology
"Still Figuring Out" (2008)	""Parallel Worlds" (re-release)" (2008)	"Time After Time" (2008)

Alternative cover
- Original release artwork

"Parallel Worlds" is the debut single from York based rock band Elliot Minor taken from their self-titled album. It was originally released on April 9, 2007, and later due to interest from radio stations and the band's label it was decided to be re-released on April 7, 2008, almost a year later.

Running concurrently to their April 2008 UK tour, the band made numerous in-store appearances in the week of release in cities such as Glasgow, London and Newcastle, meeting fans and signing the single, thus aiding the promotion of the release and continuing their reputation for strong fan interaction.

Upon its first release in 2007, "Parallel Worlds" peaked at number 31 on the UK Singles Chart and number one on the UK Indie Singles Chart. The re-release landed at number one on the Scottish Singles Chart and number 22 on the UK Singles Chart. The following week on the UK chart, it dropped to number 32. It followed "Still Figuring Out" as the band's second single to stay in the top 40 for a second week.

== Music video ==
The original music video featured the band rehearsing in an ancient room, where shelves would spontaneously fall and drawers would open, with other special effects.

In the re-release video released in 2008, the band are 'ghosts' at a dinner party, playing on a table in the room. The guests cannot see them but know something paranormal is happening, due to the shaking table. At one point Alex Davies kicks a wine glass to the floor and Dan Hetherton knocks down books from the bookshelf.

Both of these videos are loosely reflective of the theme of the track, which is inspired lyrically by the time spent by Alex Davies and Ed Minton in an attic flat in their school- Uppingham, Rutland- that Alex believed to be haunted, due to lights swinging mysteriously, posters falling, drawers opening, and other supernatural phenomena.

During filming the first video, Ed Minton's guitar neck accidentally snapped off; if you watch closely, you will see that his guitar in the video changes.

== Track listings ==
CD

1. "Parallel Worlds" – 2:56

Digital

1. "Parallel Worlds" (live) – 3:23
2. "Parallel Worlds" (Honky Tonk Instruments) – 2:40
3. "Parallel Worlds" (acoustic) – 3:15

Vinyl

1. "Parallel Worlds" – 2:56
2. "Wait Another Week" – 3:42

=== Re-release track listings ===
CD

1. "Parallel Worlds" (single edit)

Vinyl 1

1. "Parallel Worlds" (single edit)
2. "Parallel Worlds" (acoustic version)

Vinyl 2

1. "Parallel Worlds" (single edit)
2. "Parallel Worlds" (live version)

== Charts ==
Chart (2007)	Peak position
Scotland (OCC)	25
UK Singles (OCC)	31
UK Indie (OCC)	1

Chart (2008)	Peak position
Scotland (OCC)	1
UK Singles (OCC)	22
