= Time After Time (Elliot Minor song) =

Single by Elliot Minor

from the album Elliot Minor
- Released: 2008
- Recorded: 2008
- Genre: Symphonic rock; pop rock; classical
- Length: 3:56 / 3:35 (edit)
- Songwriter(s): Alex Davies, Ed Minton

Elliot Minor singles chronology
"Parallel Worlds" (2008)	"Time After Time" (2008)	"Discover (Why the Love Hurts)" (2009)

"Time After Time" is a single from the rock band Elliot Minor. It combines traditional pop rock with classical instruments such as the piano. It is Elliot Minor's fifth overall single and comes from their self-titled debut album. The song debuted at 47 on the UK Charts on 5 July 2008. It dropped out of the top 100 the week after.

The music was written by Alex Davies, and the lyrics by Alex and Ed Minton. The song was written during the time that the band was trying to get signed. They sent out hundreds of demos and heard nothing back, and the song was born out of their feelings of frustration and being trapped doing the same thing over and over again.

== Music video ==
The video shows Alex Davies (lead vocals, guitar) repeating the same day over and over again in which he tries to win back an ex-girlfriend. He walks past Ali Paul (keyboards), who is playing his keyboard on the street for money. Ed Hetherton (bass), dressed as a businessman, walks ahead of Alex and throws his coffee cup over his shoulder, hitting Alex. Alex then bumps into Ed Minton (vocals, guitar) on the street. Dan Hetherton (drums, backing vocals), dressed as a floral delivery worker, drops a bouquet of flowers, and Alex walks by without helping him. Alex reaches his destination, a store, where he tries to woo his ex-girlfriend, who works at the cash register. She quickly shoots him down.

The day then begins a second time, and all the events stay the same until Dan's scene. Instead of walking past him, Alex stops and takes a single rose from the dropped bouquet, and presents it to the cashier. She remains skeptical and still shoots him down, but smiles as Alex leaves.

The third day begins and this time Alex pays Ali for his jacket as he walks by, catches Ed's Hetherton's discarded coffee cup, sidesteps Ed Minton instead of bumping into him, and takes a full bouquet of roses from Dan. He presents the flowers to the girl and they kiss as the song ends.

== Track listing ==
=== Digital ===
1. "Time After Time" – 3:59
2. "Time After Time" (overture) – 2:34
3. "Time After Time" (live) – 4:18
