= Elliot Minor (album) =

Studio album by Elliot Minor
- Released: 14 April 2008
- Recorded: Dork Studios, Los Angeles; Fourth Street Recording, Santa Monica; Mavehole Studios, York; York Minster; Mayfair Angel & Strongbow Studios, London
- Genre: Symphonic rock; pop rock; classical
- Length: 46:17
- Label: Repossession; Warner Music; Dreamusic
- Producer: Jim Wirt

Elliot Minor chronology
Elliot Minor (2008)	Solaris (2009)

Singles from Elliot Minor
- 1. "Parallel Worlds" Released: 9 April 2007; 2. "Jessica" Released: 6 August 2007; 3. "The White One Is Evil" Released: 29 October 2007; 4. "Parallel Worlds (Re-release)" Released: 7 April 2008; 5. "Time After Time" Released: 23 June 2008

Professional ratings
Review scores
Source	Rating
Kerrang!	3/5 stars
Rock Sound	7/10 stars

Elliot Minor is the debut album from the English pop rock band Elliot Minor, released on 14 April 2008 through Repossession and Warner Bros. Records.

== History ==
The band recorded their debut album at various studios in Los Angeles, California, London and in their hometown of York. The album was confirmed for release in 2007, before being delayed and pushed back to build more promotion. It was eventually confirmed for release on 14 April 2008.

Several promotion copies were leaked onto eBay, however were swiftly removed. Demos for all of the tracks had been available for some time on various torrent websites, and several were also made available on the band's MySpace. To try and counter the leaks, the band offered the album directly from their official online store with the promise of signing the first 500 copies.

== Promotion ==
In the lead up to the album, the band released 4 singles from the album. "Parallel Worlds", "Jessica", "The White One Is Evil" and "Still Figuring Out", with "Parallel Worlds" being re-released before the album release due to a surge of popularity in the band since its original release.

== Reception ==
Upon release, the album debuted at number 6 on the UK Albums Chart, and number 30 on the Irish Albums Chart.

== Track listing ==
Elliot Minor track listing
No.	Title	Writer(s)	Length
1.	"Time After Time"	Alex Davies, Ed Minton	3:55
2.	"Parallel Worlds"	Davies, Minton	3:43
3.	"The White One Is Evil"	Davies, Minton	4:29
4.	"The Liar Is You"	Davies	3:58
5.	"Lucky Star"	Davies	3:01
6.	"Jessica"	Davies, Minton, Dan Hetherton	3:13
7.	"The Broken Minor"	Davies, Minton, D. Hetherton	5:46
8.	"Still Figuring Out"	Davies, Minton	3:29
9.	"Silently"	Davies	5:13
10.	"Running Away"	Davies, Minton, D. Hetherton	3:22
11.	"Last Call to New York City"	Davies, Minton	6:05

Japanese edition
No.	Title	Writer(s)	Length
12.	"Forgetting You"	Davies	3:15
13.	"She's Getting Around"	Davies, Minton	3:24
14.	"Wait Another Week"	Davies, Minton	3:43

== Personnel ==
- Alex Davies – vocals, lead and rhythm guitar, piano, string arrangements
- Ed Minton – vocals, lead and rhythm guitar
- Ed Hetherton – bass guitar
- Ali Paul – piano, keyboard, synthesizer
- Dan Hetherton – drums

== Charts ==
Chart performance for Elliot Minor
Chart (2008)	Peak position
Irish Albums (IRMA)	30
Scottish Albums (OCC)	5
UK Albums (OCC)	6
