= Elliot Minor =

English rock band

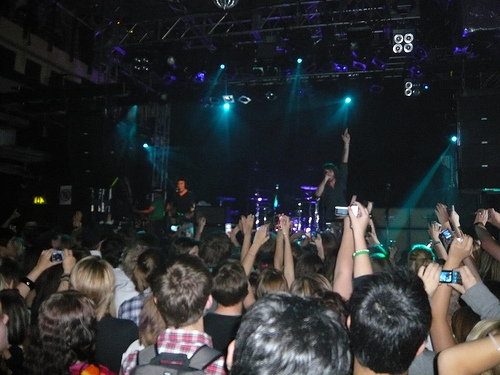
- Elliot Minor live at the 02 Academy Islington (2009)

Background information
- Origin: York, England, United Kingdom
- Genres: Symphonic rock; pop rock; classical
- Years active: 2000–2010, 2014, 2024-
- Labels: Warner Bros. Records Inc. (distribution); Repossession Records; Dreamusic Incorporated (Japan)
- Members: Alex Davies; Ed Minton; Dan Hetherton; Ed 'Teddy' Hetherton; Ali Paul
- Website: ElliotMinor.com

Elliot Minor are an English rock band from York, England. The band consists of lead vocalist and guitarist Alex Davies, vocalist and guitarist Ed Minton, drummer Dan Hetherton, bassist Ed Hetherton and keyboardist Ali Paul. The band had a string of Top 40 singles in the UK chart, including "Jessica", "The White One Is Evil", "Still Figuring Out" alongside their biggest hit "Parallel Worlds". In 2010, the band entered an indefinite hiatus which lasted until 2014 when they played some reunion shows and released a new single before returning to their hiatus. In November 2024, they announced their return from hiatus and are releasing new music and playing select UK city shows in 2025.

== History ==
=== The Academy: Formation and early days: 2000–2006 ===
Elliot Minor started as 'The academy' with Alex Davies and Ed Minton as an acoustic duo when they met at Uppingham School, both aged thirteen years old. Alex Davies, Dan and Ed Hetherton, and Ali Paul originally attended The Minster School, York, and had music scholarships to sing in the cathedral choir at York Minster. Davies invited childhood friend Dan Hetherton as a drummer to a band practice to see if he was interested in joining. Dan Hetherton recruited his brother Ed (nicknamed 'Teddy') to join the band on bass. Ali Paul was eventually invited to join the band on keyboard, completing the band's lineup. The band name was changed to 'Elliot Minor' to avoid copyright issues with 'The academy'.

=== Elliot Minor: 2006–2008 ===
In 2006, Elliot Minor won a MySpace competition to support McFly for one show on their Motion in the Ocean tour with an audience of over 11,000 at Newcastle. They signed to Repossession Records, an independent label run by their manager, Gary Ashley. Their first single, "Parallel Worlds", reached No. 31 on the UK Singles Chart; subsequent singles, "Jessica", "The White One Is Evil", and "Still Figuring Out", all reached the top 30. "Parallel Worlds" was reissued, followed by "Time After Time". In 2007 they headlined a new music festival in the south called Butserfest.

Elliot Minor signed a distribution deal with Warner Bros. Records and recorded their debut album in Santa Monica, California, with Jim Wirt, producer for Hoobastank, Jack's Mannequin, Something Corporate, Incubus and others, and it debuted on 14 April 2008. Many of the songs from the album were written during their school days. Upon release, the album managed to debut at No. 6 on the UK Albums Chart, and at No. 30 on the Irish Albums Chart.

That same year (2008), Elliot Minor played at several large music festivals, including T in the Park, Reading and Leeds, and Download Festival. Davies and Minton performed an acoustic cover of Propane Nightmares by Pendulum at T in the Park for Radio 1. Elliot Minor also made an appearance on Jo Whiley's Radio 1's Live Lounge – Volume 3, recording a cover of Take That's "Rule the World". Their song "Running Away" was featured on the BBC's coverage of the Beijing 2008 Summer Olympics.

=== Solaris and Solaris Acoustic: 2009–2010 ===
Elliot Minor took a break from touring to write their second album, Solaris. In June 2009, the band announced that their distribution deal with Warner Bros. had come to an end, and that they had decided to part ways from the label and release Solaris on Repossession Records as an independent album.

Alex Davies drew from experiences and changes in his life over the years Elliot Minor had been formed until the present when writing the album. He says, "The majority of the songs are uplifting as I was being positive in a pretty tough year to work through and the others are more personal and intimate." They have described their first album as being a collection of singles, while their second is more of a proper album with a beginning, middle, and end. This album was also recorded with Jim Wirt.

"Solaris" was announced to be the first single from the band's second album; however, due to technical problems with the format of the single, it was not released on iTunes as planned on 10 August 2009. The band decided to go with "Electric High" as the first single instead. The tracks "Solaris" and "Discover (Why the Love Hurts)" were rerecorded before the album was released on 19 October 2009. The album, mixed by John Greatwood and Tom Lord-Alge, reached No. 9 in the UK Indie Chart. The album was released in Japan, along with exclusive bonus tracks, on 21 April 2010.

An alternate version of "Solaris" was featured on the Vancouver 2010 Winter Olympics BBC coverage. The band recorded a cover of Owl City's "Fireflies" for fun, posting it on their YouTube channel along with footage of their video blogs. The song was picked up by Kerrang! and gained popularity when the station aired an edited version of the video on Kerrang! TV. The song has also received radio airplay by Kerrang!.

An hour long live special featuring the band playing live at the Relentless Garage in London on their April 2010 tour was shown on Kerrang! TV on 16 August. At the start of 2010, it was announced that an acoustic version of the album Solaris was to be recorded and released later that year. Solaris Acoustic, was released on 15 November 2010, along with a DVD of the Kerrang! live special.

=== Hiatus: 2010–present ===
On 28 August 2010, keyboardist Ali Paul announced that after completing tour commitments with Elliot Minor in September he would be leaving the band and would go on to recommence university studies. On 14 September 2011, Ali appeared on BBC One quiz show Pointless alongside his then girlfriend. Ali stated "They (Elliot Minor) haven't gone for good, everyone's just taking time out to do their own thing for now". They got to the final round but left empty handed.

In November 2010, drummer Dan Hetherton started working on a project with James Matthews, former singer of Go:Audio. They formed the band The Dead Famous with close friends Luke Bayliss and Satoshi, playing bass and guitar respectively. Satoshi was replaced in early 2011 by another close friend, Fred. In December 2011 Dan Hetherton stated via his Facebook page that other members of Elliot Minor wanted a break, so he formed the Dead Famous to continue his passion of making music.

When Ed Minton was interviewed in 2014, he spoke about Elliot Minor's hiatus stating, "It's a tough one, when a band doesn't work out well... it just doesn't work out! We had a load of issues with our label, management and all the backend stuff in general, the fans were never the reason we parted.".

Davies continued musical endeavours, producing his new band called 'Spirits' which was announced on his Twitter page. Davies currently works as a composer, composing music for the BBC TV series Silent Witness. Minton studied business management at King's College London, and is now a director in a private equity firm. Ed Hetherton studied geophysics at University College London and works in industry. Ali Paul studied law at the University of York and works as a legal professional.

==== Reunion: 2014 ====
As of 30 November 2013 the band started to post on their Facebook page, merely posting "2014" for the first few days, but building up with hints. Originally taken by fans as a reunion, the band announced on 7 December that they would play a one-off show at Camden Underworld 28 March 2014 supported by Maven, They Say Fall and Forever The Foundations. The band sold the show out in minutes and they added another show, and would go on to play another show later in 2014 to promote their new song "All My Life", a one-off single. The band then returned to their hiatus, continuing to be active on social media.

==== The Fever the Focus ====
In 2016, Alex Davies and Ed Minton came together for a one-off mini-project known as The Fever the Focus. They released an album, Fading Lights, after gaining funds through the crowd-funding website Pledge Music.

==== Return to Music: 2025 ====
In November 2024, they announced their return from hiatus and released new music in 2025. They also announced that they would be playing select UK city shows in 2025.

A new single was released on 28 February 2025, entitled ‘How Does it Feel’, an anthemic song that marks a bold new era for the band.

== Musical background and style ==
The members of Elliot Minor are classically trained musicians and play a wide variety of instruments including violin, piano, clarinet, cello, double bass, saxophone, guitar and drums. Davies was taught piano by musician, composer and broadcaster, Alexis Ffrench; Davies acknowledged “I got a lot of advice from him to pursue my rock career as well”. The Hetherton brothers also have a classical music grounding from playing in the Pocklington School orchestra.

Their music is described as "pop/rock with a lot of classical harmonies", and is known for being rich in minor and dissonant chords. Many of their songs are characterised by their vocal harmonies, including the use of polyphony. Davies cited influence from his English choral traditions stating "Renaissance harmonies have always been a big go-to for me, I just love all the harmonic clashing. I definitely tried to use that in Elliot Minor.". Their recorded songs are rich in complex string and choral arrangements, all written by Davies, which are difficult to replicate live without a full orchestra. However, the classical elements in their song "Jessica" have been replicated during performances on stage, with Davies using an electric violin. Davies also cites influence from film composer John Williams.

== Band members ==
- Alex Davies – lead and backing vocals, lead and rhythm guitars, keyboards, violin, oboe (2000–present)
- Edward Minton – lead and backing vocals, lead and rhythm guitars, violin (2000–present)
- Dan Hetherton – drums, percussion, backing vocals (2005–present)
- Edward Hetherton – bass guitars, cello, backing vocals (2005–present)
- Ali Paul – keyboards, synthesizer, piano (2006–2010, 2014–present)

== Discography ==
- Elliot Minor (2008)
- Solaris (2009)
