= Charles "Bud" Dant =

American musician, arranger and composer

Charles Dant
- Dant at NBC in 1941

Background information
- Also known as: Bud
- Born: Charles Gustave Dant; June 21, 1907; Washington, Indiana, United States
- Died: October 31, 1999 (aged 92) Kailua-Kona, Hawaii, United States
- Occupations: Musician, arranger, composer

Charles "Bud" Dant (born Charles Gustave Dant; June 21, 1907, Washington, Indiana – October 31, 1999, Kailua-Kona, Hawaii) was an American musician, arranger and composer. In the 1930s, he attended and graduated Indiana University's School of Music. Jazz composer Hoagy Carmichael had persuaded Dant—who at that time had his own "Bud Dant Collegians" danceband—to come to IU to study at their School of Music. At that time, Carmichael did not know how to read or write music. The two friends met one day in 1927 at the school's Book Nook restaurant, where Carmichael played the first several bars of a song he had conceived—a jazz chorus. He asked Dant to write an arrangement right there in the Book Nook restaurant—this was the first time the song Stardust, which at the time was called "Star Dust," had ever been written down. According to Dant, the piece was originally a peppy jazz song and recorded in 1927, but in 1928, a slower version was written out by Dant and Carmichael. The piece was recorded with Carmichael and others at the Gennett Records studio in Richmond, Indiana. In 1929, Mitchell Parish wrote lyrics to the song. Stardust, an idiosyncratic melody in medium tempo, became an American standard, and is one of the most recorded songs of the 20th century, with over 1,500 total recordings.

Dant graduated Indiana and played with big bands of the 1940s in the East Coast, notably Herby Kaye, who was briefly married to Dorothy Lamour, who provided the vocals. Dant briefly conducted his own group but in 1939, Charles left his life as a bandmember in Chicago and Indiana and came to California. He had been asked by Gordon Jenkins, the head of NBC music, to orchestrate and conduct radio shows for NBC in Hollywood. He and his wife Nell and daughter Susan settled in Beverly Hills in 1938 and Christopher was born in 1943. During this period, Dant became the musical director for NBC. He spent many years composing and conducting the music for radio and TV with such people as Jack Carson, Dennis Day, Jack Benny, Jerry Lewis and Dean Martin, Bob Hope, Julie Andrews, Cliff Arquette, Phil Harris, Bing Crosby, Hoagy Carmichael, Judy Canova, and more Artists. He also wrote and orchestrated music for movies. He conducted the orchestra for the Colgate Comedy Hour on TV. Later in his career, Dant recorded for Decca Records, which he joined in 1955 as producer.

While at Decca, Dant also discovered a talented clarinet player at The Lawrence Welk Show, Pete Fountain, and recorded 42 hit albums with him. He also recorded many albums with Ricky Nelson, Teresa Brewer, Earl Grant, and several others. His albums are still sold today. He wrote and recorded 60 albums, including The Unicorn (single #32254) with The Irish Rovers in 1968. Charles Dant was awarded several gold records for this recording in 1968. He served as executive producer of William Shatner's notorious 1968 album "The Transformed Man" (DL 75043).

Dant continued with Decca-Coral until the 1970s, when he moved to Kailua-Kona, Hawaii. There, he succeeded Webley Edwards, founder of "Hawaii Calls"—the longtime Hawaiian music radio show. He produced albums by Hawaii performers, including music composed by Alex Anderson and songs sung by Alfred Apaka and Melveen Leed. Dant belonged to St. Michael's Catholic Church and was band leader at Hulihee Palace. On October 31, 1999, he died at age 92 of natural causes in Kailua-Kona, Hawaii, and was buried at St. Michael's Church. He was married to Nell Dant, they had two Children, Susan and Chris, and has two grandchildren, Carrie and Vince.
