= Instant Armadillo Blues =

Compilation album by New Riders of the Purple Sage
- Released: November 21, 2011
- Recorded: 1971–1975
- Genre: Country rock
- Label: Raven

New Riders of the Purple Sage chronology
| Setlist: The Very Best of New Riders of the Purple Sage Live (2011) | Instant Armadillo Blues (2011) | 17 Pine Avenue (2012) |

Instant Armadillo Blues is a two-CD compilation album by the country rock band the New Riders of the Purple Sage. Subtitled Best of 1971–1975, it contains songs selected from the first seven New Riders albums. It was released in Australia on the Raven Records label on November 21, 2011.

The songs on Instant Armadillo Blues were excerpted from New Riders of the Purple Sage (1971), Powerglide (1972), Gypsy Cowboy (1972), The Adventures of Panama Red (1973), Home, Home on the Road (1974), Brujo (1974), and Oh, What a Mighty Time (1975).

Jerry Garcia of the Grateful Dead plays pedal steel guitar on the first nine tracks of the album. Guest musicians who contribute to individual songs include Mickey Hart, Bill Kreutzmann, Donna Jean Godchaux, Buffy Sainte-Marie, Commander Cody, Nicky Hopkins, and Sly Stone.

The photo on the front cover of the album is from approximately 1975, and depicts, from left to right, David Nelson, John Dawson, Skip Battin, Buddy Cage, and Spencer Dryden.

== Critical reception ==
Professional ratings
Review scores
| Source | Rating |
|---|---|
| Allmusic | 4/5 stars |
| Record Collector | 3/5 stars |

On Allmusic, Thom Jurek wrote, "Australia's excellent Raven reissue label offers a definitive double-disc anthology of the New Riders of the Purple Sage's tenure with Columbia Records.... The sound on this collection is completely remastered and the set contains an excellent liner essay by Raven's own Glenn A. Baker. Instant Armadillo Blues trumps the original Columbia best-of collection, as it goes far deeper, and is right to have left off the material they later recorded for MCA and A&M, which was wildly inconsistent. This collection is the standard-bearer of essential material by this often overlooked but excellent country-rock band."

Record Collector magazine said, "This two-disc set collates all of their better moments. The New Riders made eight albums in the early 70s, and the compilers haven't missed any tricks by including bassist Dave Torbert's "Groupie" or the dope anthem "Panama Red" — lent a real swing time thrust thanks to Norbert Putnam at the controls. The quality drops off when gaze turns to the so-so Gypsy Cowboy album and the Bob Johnston-produced Oh, What a Mighty Time (a cover of Bob Dylan's "Farewell, Angelina" aside). Still, Sage lovers can find plenty here to back the view that Dawson and Nelson's troupe once gave the Flying Burrito Brothers and Poco a run for their money."

== Track listing ==
=== Disc 1 ===
From New Riders of the Purple Sage:

1. "I Don't Know You" (John Dawson) – 2:26
2. "Whatcha Gonna Do" (Dawson) – 3:17
3. "Portland Woman" (Dawson) – 3:36
4. "Henry" (Dawson) – 2:36
5. "Dirty Business" (Dawson) – 7:56
6. "Glendale Train" (Dawson) – 3:00
7. "All I Ever Wanted" (Dawson) – 4:37
8. "Last Lonely Eagle" (Dawson) – 5:12
9. "Louisiana Lady" (Dawson) – 3:03

From Powerglide:

10. "Dim Lights, Thick Smoke (And Loud, Loud Music)" (Joe Maphis, Max Fidler, Rose Lee Maphis) – 4:15
11. "Rainbow" (Dawson) – 3:05
12. "California Day" (Dave Torbert) – 2:40
13. "Sweet Lovin' One" (Dawson) – 2:30
14. "I Don't Need No Doctor" (Nick Ashford, Valerie Simpson, Jo Armstead) – 4:47
15. "Contract" (Torbert) – 3:10
16. "Willie and the Hand Jive" (Johnny Otis) – 6:50

From Gypsy Cowboy:

17. "Gypsy Cowboy" (Torbert) – 4:17
18. "Groupie" (Torbert) – 2:40
19. "Sutter's Mill" (Dawson) – 1:52
20. "Linda" (Dawson) – 3:04

=== Disc 2 ===
From Gypsy Cowboy:

1. "Superman" (Dawson) – 3:09
2. "She's No Angel" (Wanda Ballman) – 2:51
3. "Long Black Veil" (Danny Dill, Marijohn Wilkin) – 3:56
4. "Sailin'" (Dawson) – 2:49

From The Adventures of Panama Red:

5. "Panama Red" (Peter Rowan) – 2:47
6. "Lonesome L.A. Cowboy" (Rowan) – 4:05
7. "Kick in the Head" (Robert Hunter) – 2:30
8. "You Should Have Seen Me Runnin'" (Dawson) – 3:01
9. "Teardrops in My Eyes" (Red Allen, Tommy Sutton) – 2:15
10. "Cement, Clay and Glass" (Spencer Dryden, David Nelson) – 2:34

From Home, Home on the Road:

11. "Hi, Hello, How Are You" (Dawson)
12. "Truck Drivin' Man" (Terry Fell)
13. "Hello Mary Lou" (Gene Pitney)
14. "School Days" (Chuck Berry)

From Brujo:

15. "Ashes of Love" (Jack Anglin, Johnnie Wright) – 2:14
16. "You Angel You" (Bob Dylan) – 2:43
17. "Instant Armadillo Blues" (Dawson) – 2:52
18. "Singing Cowboy" (Skip Battin, Kim Fowley) – 3:57

From Oh, What a Mighty Time:

19. "Farewell, Angelina" (Dylan) – 2:42
20. "I Heard You Been Layin' My Old Lady" (Russell Wier) – 3:24
21. "Up Against the Wall, Redneck Mother" (Ray Wylie Hubbard) – 4:13
22. "Mighty Time" (Don Nix) – 5:13

== Personnel ==
=== New Riders of the Purple Sage ===
- John Dawson – guitar, vocals
- David Nelson – guitar, vocals
- Jerry Garcia – pedal steel guitar on disc 1 tracks 1 – 9
- Buddy Cage – pedal steel guitar on disc 1 tracks 10 – 20 and disc 2
- Dave Torbert – bass, vocals on disc 1 and disc 2 tracks 1 – 14
- Skip Battin – bass, vocals on disc 2 tracks 15 – 22
- Spencer Dryden – drums

=== Additional musicians ===
- Mickey Hart – drums and percussion on some tracks from New Riders of the Purple Sage
- Commander Cody – piano on some tracks from New Riders of the Purple Sage
- Nicky Hopkins – piano on "Dim Lights, Thick Smoke", "California Day", "I Don't Need No Doctor", "Contract", "Willie and the Hand Jive"
- Jerry Garcia – banjo on "Sweet Lovin' One"; guitar on "I Heard You Been Layin' My Old Lady", "Mighty Time"
- Bill Kreutzmann – percussion on "Willie and the Hand Jive"
- Carlene DiDomenico – vocals on "Superman"
- Donna Jean Godchaux – vocals on "She's No Angel", "Long Black Veil"
- Richard Greene – violin on some tracks from Gypsy Cowboy
- Mark Naftalin – piano on some tracks from Gypsy Cowboy; keyboards on some tracks from Brujo
- Jack Schroer – saxophone on some tracks from Gypsy Cowboy
- Buffy Sainte-Marie – vocals on "You Should Have Seen Me Runnin'" and "Cement, Clay and Glass"
- The Memphis Horns – horns on some tracks from The Adventures of Panama Red
- Andy Stein – baritone saxophone on "School Days"
- Neil Larson – keyboards on some tracks from Brujo
- Ed Freeman – mellotron on some tracks from Brujo
- Dan Patiris – English horn on some tracks from Brujo
- Armando Peraza – bongos on some tracks from Brujo
- Sly Stone – organ, piano, vocals on "Mighty Time"
- Pepper Watkins, Bootche Anderson, Marilyn Scott – vocals on "I Heard You Been Layin' My Old Lady", "Up Against the Wall, Redneck"
- St. Beulah's Church Choir – vocals on "Mighty Time"
- Portion of Glide Memorial Church Choir – vocals on "Mighty Time"

=== Production ===
- Peter Shillito – compilation, preparation for release
- Ian McFarlane – preparation for release
- Kevin Mueller – preparation for release
- Glenn A. Baker – liner notes
