= Wasted Tasters =

Compilation album by New Riders of the Purple Sage
- Released: 1994
- Recorded: 1971–1975
- Genre: Country rock
- Label: Raven

New Riders of the Purple Sage chronology
| Live in Japan (1994) | Wasted Tasters (1994) | Live (1995) |

Professional ratings
Review scores
| Source | Rating |
|---|---|
| Allmusic | 4.5/5 stars |

Wasted Tasters is an album by the country rock band the New Riders of the Purple Sage. It contains previously released songs selected from the first seven New Riders albums, which were recorded between 1971 and 1975. It was released in Australia on the Raven Records label on May 19, 1994.

The songs on Wasted Tasters were excerpted from New Riders of the Purple Sage (1971), Powerglide (1972), Gypsy Cowboy (1972), The Adventures of Panama Red (1973), Home, Home on the Road (1974), Brujo (1974), and Oh, What a Mighty Time (1975).

Jerry Garcia of the Grateful Dead plays pedal steel guitar on the first five tracks.

The front cover illustration for Wasted Tasters was taken from the inside cover of Powerglide. It was drawn by Lore Orion, who was formerly known as Lawrence "Lore" Shoberg. It depicts, from left to right, David Nelson, John Dawson, Spencer Dryden, Dave Torbert, and Buddy Cage.

== Track listing ==
From New Riders of the Purple Sage:

1. "Henry" (John Dawson) – 2:33
2. "Glendale Train" (Dawson) – 2:55
3. "Louisiana Lady" (Dawson) – 3:05
4. "I Don't Know You" (Dawson) – 3:05
5. "Last Lonely Eagle" (Dawson) – 5:14

From Powerglide:

6. "I Don't Need No Doctor" (Nick Ashford, Valerie Simpson, Jo Armstead) – 3:07
7. "Contract" (Dave Torbert) – 3:10
8. "Rainbow" (Dawson) – 3:05
9. "Sweet Lovin' One" (Dawson) – 2:30
10. "Dim Lights, Thick Smoke (And Loud, Loud Music)" (Joe Maphis, Max Fidler, Rose Lee Maphis) – 4:15

From Gypsy Cowboy:

11. "She's No Angel" (Wanda Ballman, J.W. Arnold) – 2:51
12. "Gypsy Cowboy" (Torbert) – 4:17
13. "Sutter's Mill" (Dawson) – 1:52
14. "Sailin'" (Dawson) – 2:58

From The Adventures of Panama Red:

15. "Panama Red" (Peter Rowan) – 2:48
16. "Lonesome L.A. Cowboy" (Rowan) – 4:08
17. "Kick in the Head" (Robert Hunter) – 2:28
18. "Teardrops in My Eyes" (Red Allen, Tommy Sutton) – 2:12

From Home, Home on the Road:

19. "Hello Mary Lou" (Gene Pitney, Cayet Mangiaracina) – 3:00
20. "Dead Flowers" (Mick Jagger, Keith Richards) – 4:03

From Brujo:

21. "You Angel You" (Bob Dylan) – 2:41
22. "Singing Cowboy" (Skip Battin, Kim Fowley) – 3:53

From Oh, What a Mighty Time:

23. "I Heard You Been Layin' My Old Lady" (Russell Wier) – 3:22
24. "Farewell, Angelina" (Dylan) – 2:37

== Personnel ==
=== New Riders of the Purple Sage ===
- John Dawson – guitar, vocals
- David Nelson – guitar, vocals
- Jerry Garcia – pedal steel guitar on tracks 1 – 5
- Buddy Cage – pedal steel guitar on tracks 6 – 24
- Dave Torbert – bass, vocals on tracks 1 – 20
- Skip Battin – bass, vocals on tracks 21 – 24
- Spencer Dryden – drums

=== Production ===
- Conceived and compiled by Glenn A. Baker, Kevin Mueller, and Peter Shillito
- Annotated by Glenn A. Baker
- Mastering by Warren Barnett
