= Cactus Juice =

Compilation album by New Riders of the Purple Sage
- Released: September 26, 2006
- Recorded: 1971–1975
- Genre: Country rock
- Label: Arcadia

New Riders of the Purple Sage chronology
Armadillo World Headquarters, Austin, TX, 6/13/75 (2005)	Cactus Juice (2006)	S.U.N.Y., Stonybrook, NY, 3/17/73 (2007)

Cactus Juice is a two-CD album by the country rock band the New Riders of the Purple Sage. It was released by Arcadia Records in 2006. It is a repackaging of three complete New Riders albums from the 1970s — Home, Home on the Road; Brujo; and Oh, What a Mighty Time.

== Live in concert ==
The first disc was recorded live in concert. It includes the 1974 album Home, Home on the Road, which was produced by Jerry Garcia of the Grateful Dead. Garcia had co-founded NRPS in 1969, along with John "Marmaduke" Dawson and David Nelson, and was the band's original pedal steel guitar player. Home, Home on the Road features the "classic" early '70s lineup of the band — Dawson, Nelson, Dave Torbert, Buddy Cage, and Spencer Dryden.

Disc one also includes four additional songs. These bonus tracks were recorded live at the Fillmore West in 1971 and also had been previously released. The first three songs — "Down in the Boondocks", "The Weight", and "Superman" — had originally appeared on the 2003 expanded re-release of the band's eponymous first album. The fourth song, "Henry", was taken from the 1972 album Fillmore: The Last Days, by various artists. Garcia plays pedal steel on these tracks.

== In the studio ==
The second disc was recorded in the studio. It consists of the 1974 album Brujo and the 1975 album Oh, What a Mighty Time.

Before Brujo was recorded, Skip Battin, formerly of the Byrds, had replaced Dave Torbert as the New Riders' bass player, after Torbert left to join Kingfish.

On Oh, What a Mighty Time, Jerry Garcia plays guitar on three songs — "Mighty Time", "I Heard You Been Layin' My Old Lady" and "Take a Letter Maria". Sly Stone plays keyboards on "Mighty Time".

== Cover ==
The cover photo for Cactus Juice was taken by Herb Greene as part of the photo shoot for Oh, What a Mighty Time. Pictured from left to right are John Dawson, Spencer Dryden, David Nelson, Skip Battin, and Buddy Cage.

== Track listing ==
=== Disc one ===
Home, Home on the Road:

1. "Hi, Hello, How Are You" (John Dawson) – 2:30
2. "She's No Angel" (J.W. Arnold, Wanda Ballman) – 3:09
3. "Groupie" (Dave Torbert) – 2:43
4. "Sunday Susie" (Dawson) – 2:37
5. "Kick in the Head" (Robert Hunter) – 3:13
6. "Truck Drivin' Man" (Terry Fell) – 3:10
7. "Hello Mary Lou" (Gene Pitney) – 3:47
8. "Sutter's Mill" (Dawson) – 2:10
9. "Dead Flowers" (Mick Jagger, Keith Richards) – 4:01
10. "Henry" (Dawson) – 4:43
11. "School Days" (Chuck Berry) – 3:33

Bonus tracks:

12. "Down in the Boondocks" (Joe South) – 4:03
13. "The Weight" (Robbie Robertson) – 7:36
14. "Superman" (Dawson) – 4:04
15. "Henry" (Dawson) – 4:05

=== Disc two ===
Brujo:

1. "Old Man Noll" (Dawson) – 2:44
2. "Ashes of Love" (Jack Anglin, Johnnie Wright) – 2:14
3. "You Angel You" (Bob Dylan) – 2:43
4. "Instant Armadillo Blues" (Dawson) – 2:52
5. "Workingman's Woman" (Troy Seals, Will Jennings, Don Goodman) – 2:44
6. "On the Amazon" (Skip Battin, Kim Fowley) – 3:34
7. "Big Wheels" (Battin, Fowley) – 3:00
8. "Singing Cowboy" (Battin, Fowley) – 3:57
9. "Crooked Judge" (Hunter, David Nelson) – 2:59
10. "Parson Brown" (Dawson) – 3:06
11. "Neon Rose" (Battin, Fowley) – 4:24

Oh, What a Mighty Time:

12. "Mighty Time" (Don Nix) – 5:13
13. "I Heard You Been Layin' My Old Lady" (Russell Wier) – 3:24
14. "Strangers on a Train" (Battin, Fowley) – 2:45
15. "Up Against the Wall, Redneck" (Ray Wylie Hubbard) – 4:13
16. "Take a Letter, Maria" (R. B. Greaves) – 4:07
17. "Little Old Lady" (Richard Wilbur) – 2:52
18. "On Top of Old Smoky" (traditional, arranged and adapted by Frank Wakefield) – 2:39
19. "Over and Over" (Dawson) – 3:08
20. "La Bamba" (Ritchie Valens) – 3:44
21. "Going Round the Horn" (Dawson, Wakefield) – 3:33
22. "Farewell, Angelina" (Dylan) – 2:42

== Personnel ==
- John Dawson – guitar, vocals
- David Nelson – guitar, vocals
- Dave Torbert – bass, vocals (disc one)
- Skip Battin – bass, vocals (disc two)
- Buddy Cage – pedal steel guitar (disc one tracks 1 – 11 and disc two)
- Jerry Garcia – pedal steel guitar (disc one tracks 12 – 15)
- Spencer Dryden – drums
