= The Best of New Riders of the Purple Sage =

Greatest hits album by New Riders of the Purple Sage
- Released: 1976
- Recorded: 1971–1975
- Genre: Country rock
- Label: Columbia

New Riders of the Purple Sage chronology
Oh, What a Mighty Time (1975)	The Best of New Riders of the Purple Sage (1976)	New Riders (1976)

Professional ratings
Review scores
Source	Rating
Allmusic	4/5 stars
Allmusic	(re-release)
Christgau's Record Guide	D+
Sounds	3/5 stars

The Best of New Riders of the Purple Sage is an album by the country rock band the New Riders of the Purple Sage. It contains a selection of songs that had previously appeared on the band's first seven albums, which were recorded between 1971 and 1975. It was released by Columbia Records in 1976.

According to the biography of the band on their official web site, "Just about this time, the music business was entering another era and the New Riders ended their relationship with Columbia Records. The subsequent release of The Best of New Riders of the Purple Sage, with its infamous cover, fulfilled their obligation to Columbia and the band then signed with MCA Records in 1976."

Five of the ten songs on The Best of New Riders of the Purple Sage were taken from the band's self-titled first album. Jerry Garcia of the Grateful Dead plays pedal steel guitar on those tracks.

== Expanded re-release ==
In 2006, The Best of New Riders of the Purple Sage was re-released with five additional songs. Four of the "bonus tracks" had been previously released on the Columbia albums. The fifth is an alternate version of "Linda", from the Gypsy Cowboy recording sessions.

== Track listing ==
1. "I Don't Know You" (John Dawson) – 2:29
2. "Glendale Train" (Dawson) – 3:02
3. "Hello Mary Lou" (Gene Pitney, Cayet Mangiaracina) – 2:59
4. "Louisiana Lady" (Dawson) – 3:06
5. "Kick in the Head" (Robert Hunter) – 2:33
6. "Panama Red" (Peter Rowan) – 2:49
7. "Last Lonely Eagle" (Dawson) – 5:14
8. "You Angel You" (Bob Dylan) – 2:45
9. "I Don't Need No Doctor" (single version) (Jo Armstead, Nick Ashford, Valerie Simpson) – 3:09
10. "Henry" (Dawson) – 2:36

Re-release bonus tracks:

11. "Linda" (Dawson) – 3:14
12. "Farewell, Angelina" (Dylan) – 2:42
13. "She's No Angel" (Wanda Ballman, J.W. Arnold) – 3:13
14. "Sunday Susie" (Dawson) – 2:34
15. "Groupie" (Dave Torbert) – 2:43

== Original releases ==
The New Riders' first seven albums and the songs that were selected from them for The Best of New Riders of the Purple Sage are:

- New Riders of the Purple Sage (1971): "I Don't Know You", "Glendale Train", "Louisiana Lady", "Last Lonely Eagle", "Henry"
- Powerglide (1972): "I Don't Need No Doctor" (the shorter single version is used on The Best of New Riders of the Purple Sage)
- Gypsy Cowboy (1972): "Linda"* (a previously unreleased alternate version appears on The Best of New Riders of the Purple Sage)
- The Adventures of Panama Red (1973): "Kick in the Head", "Panama Red"
- Home, Home on the Road (1974): "Hello Mary Lou", "She's No Angel"*, "Sunday Susie"*, "Groupie"*
- Brujo (1974): "You Angel You"
- Oh, What a Mighty Time (1975): "Farewell, Angelina"*

*expanded edition bonus track

== Personnel ==
=== New Riders of the Purple Sage ===
- John Dawson – guitar, vocals
- David Nelson – guitar, vocals
- Jerry Garcia – pedal steel guitar on "I Don't Know You", "Glendale Train", "Louisiana Lady", "Last Lonely Eagle", and "Henry"
- Buddy Cage – pedal steel guitar on "Hello Mary Lou", "Kick in the Head", "Panama Red", "You Angel You", and "I Don't Need No Doctor", "Linda"*, "Farewell, Angelina"*, "She's No Angel"*, "Sunday Susie"*, "Groupie"*
- Dave Torbert – bass, vocals on "I Don't Know You", "Glendale Train", "Hello Mary Lou", "Louisiana Lady", "Kick in the Head", "Panama Red", "Last Lonely Eagle", "I Don't Need No Doctor", "Henry", "Linda"*, "She's No Angel"*, "Sunday Susie"*, "Groupie"*
- Skip Battin – bass, vocals on "You Angel You", "Farewell Angelina"*
- Spencer Dryden – drums, percussion

*expanded edition bonus track

=== Additional musicians ===
- Mickey Hart – drums, percussion on "Last Lonely Eagle"
- Commander Cody – piano on "Last Lonely Eagle"
- Bill Kreutzmann – percussion on "I Don't Need No Doctor"
- Nicky Hopkins – piano on "I Don't Need No Doctor"

=== Production ===
- Ed Lee – design
- Eric Meola – photo
- Gerard Huerta – lettering
- Richard Kenerson – lettering
