= Hempsteader =

Live album by New Riders of the Purple Sage
- Released: April 19, 2024
- Recorded: June 25, 1976
- Venue: Calderone Concert Hall
- Genre: Country rock
- Length: 79:14
- Label: Omnivore
- Producer: Rob Bleetstein

New Riders of the Purple Sage chronology
Lyceum '72 (2022)	Hempsteader (2024)

Hempsteader is a live album by the country rock band the New Riders of the Purple Sage. It was recorded on June 25, 1976, at the Calderone Concert Hall in Hempstead, New York. It was released as a CD on April 19, 2024. It was released as a two-disc LP on October 4, 2024.

Hempsteader features the New Riders' 1976 to 1977 lineup of John Dawson on guitar and vocals, David Nelson on guitar and vocals, Buddy Cage on pedal steel guitar, Stephen Love on bass and vocals, and Spencer Dryden on drums. At the time of the Hempstead concert, the band was touring behind their album New Riders, which had been released about two months earlier.

== Critical reception ==
In Goldmine, Ray Chelstowski wrote, "[The album] captures an act performing at their musical peak. Always known for their remarkable musicianship across every chair in the band, this record presents their abilities with remarkable clarity and sonic depth.... This is a group in top form, playing a room at its rock height, to an audience that clearly got more than they bargained for..."

In Americana Highways, Jeff Burger said, "The 18-song, nearly 80-minute set includes energized readings of a few of the group’s best-known early numbers, such as "Glendale Train", "Henry", "Portland Woman", and "Panama Red". You’ll also find a motley assortment of party-ready covers drawn from the group's then-recent studio albums..."

Also in Americana Highways, John Apice wrote, "The sound for a live recording from 1976 is quite good & gets better as it progresses. It’s especially fine since the performance is always energetic & that comes through.... The band does manage to mix up the repertoire with a balanced set of tunes, some pure country, country-rock, folky elements, bluegrass & an excellent 12-minute plus jam "Portland Woman"."

In Glide Magazine Doug Collette said, "Circa America's centennial, this NRPS fivesome remained tightly knit as a performing unit. As such, they were well able to proffer a broad range of material over these eighty-some minutes, which is Hempsteader.... NRPS thus exhibited an array of virtues by which they elicited rightful acclamation from a rowdy crowd."

== Track listing ==
1. "Panama Red" (Peter Rowan)
2. "Little Old Lady" (Richard Wilbur)
3. "Honky Tonkin' (I Guess I Done Me Some)" (Delbert McClinton)
4. "Fifteen Days Under the Hood" (Jack Tempchin)
5. "Annie May" (Vick Thomas)
6. "Henry" (John Dawson)
7. "Don't Put Her Down" (Hazel Dickens)
8. "Ashes of Love" (Jim Anglin, Jack Anglin, Johnnie Wright)
9. "Portland Woman" (Dawson)
10. "Whiskey" (Dawson)
11. "She's Looking Better Every Beer" (John Shine)
12. "Teardrops in My Eyes" (Red Allen, Tommy Sutton)
13. "I Heard You've Been Layin' My Old Lady" (Rusty Wier)
14. "The Swimming Song" (Loudon Wainwright III)
15. "You Never Can Tell" (Chuck Berry)
16. "Hard to Handle" (Allen Jones, Alvertis Isbell, Otis Redding )
17. "Glendale Train" (Dawson)
18. "Dead Flowers" (Mick Jagger, Keith Richards)

== Personnel ==
New Riders of the Purple Sage

- John Dawson – guitar, vocals
- David Nelson – guitar, vocals
- Buddy Cage – pedal steel guitar
- Stephen Love – bass, vocals
- Spencer Dryden – drums

Production

- Produced for release by Rob Bleetstein
- Mastering: David Glasser
- Art direction, design: Greg Allen
- Photos, liner notes: Rob Bleetstein
