= Lyceum '72 =

Live album by New Riders of the Purple Sage
- Released: September 23, 2022
- Recorded: May 26, 1972
- Venue: Lyceum Theatre
- Genre: Country rock
- Length: 78:22
- Label: Omnivore

New Riders of the Purple Sage chronology
| Bear's Sonic Journals: Dawn of the New Riders of the Purple Sage (2020) | Lyceum '72 (2022) | Hempsteader (2024) |

Lyceum '72 is a live album by the country rock band the New Riders of the Purple Sage. It was recorded at the Lyceum Theatre in London on May 26, 1972. It was released on CD on September 23, 2022. It was released as a three-disc LP on April 22, 2023.

At this concert, the New Riders were the opening act for the Grateful Dead, who were playing the final show of their Europe '72 tour. The Dead's performance from this date is documented on the album Lyceum Theatre, London, England 5/26/72.

== Critical reception ==
In Glide Magazine Doug Collette wrote, "While it's fair to say the New Riders were certainly hitting their collective stride at this point, they were nowhere near complacent... Yet the sound forged by the quintet on exhibit here is all the more authentic given how they revel in it (albeit in an understated fashion); it's validation of why the group remained a logical opening act for [the Grateful Dead] long past the early points when the NRPS lineup featured members of the Dead."

John Apice of Americana Highways stated that the album sounds "fresh as the day it was recorded," and commented: "These people mix it up nicely & sound as proficient as the Dead but are more entertaining... I was glad they were able to preserve this. Nothing lasts forever but it was quite a time with memorable music by exceptional young musicians."

== Track listing ==
1. "Leaving On Her Mind" (Jack Clement) – 2:52
2. "Whatcha Gonna Do" (John Dawson) – 3:32
3. "Hello Mary Lou" (Gene Pitney, Cayet Mangiaracina) – 3:02
4. "Lochinvar" (Dawson) – 5:13
5. "Truck Drivin' Man" (Terry Fell) – 3:11
6. "Glendale Train" (Dawson) – 5:06
7. "California Day" (Dave Torbert) – 2:54
8. "Duncan and Brady" (traditional, arranged by John Koerner) – 5:35
9. "Dim Lights, Thick Smoke (And Loud, Loud Music)" (Joe Maphis, Max Fidler, Rose Lee) – 3:52
10. "I Don't Need No Doctor" (Nick Ashford, Valerie Simpson, Jo Armstead) – 6:09
11. "Rainbow" (Dawson) – 3:47
12. "Connection" (Mick Jagger, Keith Richards) – 4:31
13. "Sailin'" (Dawson) – 4:30
14. "Dirty Business" (Dawson) – 9:01
15. "Last Lonely Eagle" (Dawson) – 5:42
16. "Louisiana Lady" (Dawson) – 4:26
17. "Honky Tonk Women" (Jagger, Richards) – 4:59

== Personnel ==
New Riders of the Purple Sage

- John Dawson – guitar, vocals
- David Nelson – guitar, vocals
- Dave Torbert – bass guitar, vocals
- Buddy Cage – pedal steel guitar
- Spencer Dryden – drums

Production

- Produced by Rob Bleetstein
- Recording: Betty Cantor, Janet Furman, Bob Matthews, Rosie, Wizard
- Mixing: Jeffrey Norman
- Mastering: David Glasser
- Liner notes: Sam Cutler
- Cover art: Kevin Morgan Studio
- Design, layout: Greg Allen
