= Before Time Began =

Studio album by New Riders of the Purple Sage
- Released: 1986
- Recorded: 1968, 1969, 1985
- Genre: Country rock, experimental
- Length: 37:57
- Label: Relix
- Producer: David Nelson

New Riders of the Purple Sage chronology
Feelin' All Right (1981)	Before Time Began (1986)	Vintage NRPS (1986)

Professional ratings
Review scores
Source	Rating
AllMusic	2/5 stars

Before Time Began is the eleventh studio album and thirteenth album overall by the country rock group the New Riders of the Purple Sage. It was released in 1986 on the Relix Records label.

The first half of the album contains very early recording sessions by the New Riders. Some of the songs are performed by the original lineup of the band, which consisted of John "Marmaduke" Dawson, David Nelson, and three members of the Grateful Dead — Jerry Garcia, Phil Lesh, and Mickey Hart. The second half of the album contains experimental music created by David Nelson, called "The Backwards Tapes".

== Early New Riders ==
The first four songs on Before Time Began are from the New Riders' first studio session, at Pacific High Recording in San Francisco, California, in November 1969. This is the only known studio recording made by the band's original lineup. In the following two years, NRPS often performed as the opening act at Grateful Dead concerts. In 1970, Dave Torbert replaced Phil Lesh as the New Riders' bass player, and Spencer Dryden replaced Mickey Hart on drums.

The next two songs on the album are from an even earlier studio session, before the New Riders of the Purple Sage had formed. This session took place at Pacific Recording in San Mateo, California, on July 31, 1968. These tracks are credited to "Marmaduke and friends". According to the album liner notes, which were written by David Nelson, these are "two songs John [Dawson] cut in 1968 in San Mateo with the help of Garcia and some members of Doug Sahm's group," indicating that Jerry Garcia plays pedal steel guitar on these tracks.

Bob Matthews was the audio engineer at both studio sessions. Along with Betty Cantor, Matthews recorded many Grateful Dead concerts, and co-produced their albums Live/Dead and American Beauty. He also played bass at some early New Riders concerts when Phil Lesh was not available.

== The Backwards Tapes ==
The final six songs on Before Time Began are "The Backwards Tapes". This experimental music was recorded by David Nelson in the mid-1980s. Nelson had become interested in speaking, singing, and playing music backwards, so that the lyrics and melody would be correct when the tape was played back in reverse. "The Backwards Tapes" were made using a multitrack analog tape recorder, and contain different combinations of tracks that were recorded backwards or forwards. In the album liner notes, Nelson explains this process, and also comments briefly on each of the songs.

For example, "Deh Rominap" is an interpretation of the chorus of the New Riders' hit single "Panama Red", from their album The Adventures of Panama Red. Nelson recorded himself singing the words and playing the guitar backwards, to sound forwards when played back in reverse. The song "Deh Rominap" has three parts. First the tape recording is played backwards, sounding like the chorus of "Panama Red" performed forwards, but eerily and humorously distorted. Next the tape recording is played forwards, so the listener hears Nelson's backwards performance. Finally the tape is played backwards again. The name of the song is a transcription of the phrase that Nelson found he had to sing to produce the words "Panama Red" when played back in reverse.

== Track listing ==
Part 1 – Early New Riders

1. "Henry" (John Dawson) – 3:39
2. "All I Ever Wanted" (Dawson) – 4:28
3. "Last Lonely Eagle" (Dawson) – 4:47
4. "Cecilia" (Dawson) – 4:06
5. "Garden of Eden" (Dawson) – 3:09
6. "Superman" (Dawson) – 2:19

Part 2 – The Backwards Tapes

7. "Deh Rominap" (Peter Rowan, David Nelson) – 1:48
8. "A Handful of Brains" (Nelson) – 2:43
9. "I'm Through with the Fish, Harve" (Nelson) – 1:44
10. "Och Tamale" (C. Merle Waterman, Nelson) – 1:25
11. "A Handful of Brains Part II" (Nelson) – 4:49
12. "Where Discipline Comes In" (Nelson) – 2:52

== Personnel ==
=== Musicians ===
Tracks 1 – 4

- John Dawson – acoustic guitar, lead vocals
- David Nelson – electric guitar, vocals
- Jerry Garcia – pedal steel guitar, vocals
- Phil Lesh – bass
- Mickey Hart – drums

Tracks 5 – 6

- Marmaduke and friends (John Dawson, Jerry Garcia, and some members of Doug Sahm's group)

Tracks 7 – 12

- David Nelson – guitar, vocals

=== Production ===
- David Nelson – producer
- George Horn – mastering
- David Nelson – cover art
