= Bear's Sonic Journals: Dawn of the New Riders of the Purple Sage =

Live album by New Riders of the Purple Sage
- Released: January 17, 2020
- Recorded: August 1969 – June 1970
- Genre: Country rock
- Length: 301:55
- Label: Owsley Stanley Foundation

New Riders of the Purple Sage chronology
Thanksgiving in New York City (2019)	Bear's Sonic Journals: Dawn of the New Riders of the Purple Sage (2020)	Lyceum '72 (2022)

Jerry Garcia chronology
Garcia Live Volume 12 (2019)	Bear's Sonic Journals: Dawn of the New Riders of the Purple Sage (2020)	Garcia Live Volume 13 (2020)

Bear's Sonic Journals chronology
Bear's Sonic Journals: Before We Were Them (2019)	Bear's Sonic Journals: Dawn of the New Riders of the Purple Sage (2020)	Bear's Sonic Journals: Found in the Ozone (2020)

Bear's Sonic Journals: Dawn of the New Riders of the Purple Sage is a 5-CD live album by the country rock band the New Riders of the Purple Sage. It was recorded at various venues in the San Francisco Bay Area from August 1969 to June 1970. It was released on January 17, 2020.

Dawn of the New Riders of the Purple Sage was recorded by the audio engineer (and LSD chemist) Owsley "Bear" Stanley. The album captures performances from the early days of the New Riders, with John "Marmaduke" Dawson on guitar and lead vocals, David Nelson on guitar and vocals, Jerry Garcia on pedal steel guitar, and Mickey Hart on drums. Initially Bob Matthews or Phil Lesh played bass guitar with the band, depending on circumstance. In April 1970 Dave Torbert became the band's bassist. Matthews is featured on the first four CDs of the album and Torbert plays on the fifth disc.

On Dawn of the New Riders the band performs original songs by Dawson, along with covers by various country and western artists. A number of the tunes had not appeared on any previous NRPS album. Bob Weir sits in on some tracks from two different dates.

Dawn of the New Riders of the Purple Sage was produced by the Owsley Stanley Foundation, a nonprofit organization dedicated to preserving Stanley's recordings of different bands and musicians. Other albums in the Bear's Sonic Journals series feature Doc Watson, the Allman Brothers Band, Hot Tuna, and Commander Cody and His Lost Planet Airmen.

== Critical reception ==
In Glide Magazine, Doug Collette wrote, "Nearly two dozen songs appear here never before officially released by the New Riders or the Grateful Dead and they are juxtaposed with several New Riders originals... And, even if the audio isn't always clear, its betterment is evident over the course of the five compact discs, in keeping with the increasing clarity and confidence of the performances themselves.... Garcia was clearly still finding himself on pedal steel, but relished the prospect of continuing to learn the instrument: here he makes it weep on Dawson's "Sweet Lovin' One" and intertwine with David Nelson's Fender on the sprightly "Louisiana Lady", among others."

== Track listing ==
Disc 1

August 1, 1969 (set 2) – The Bear's Lair, Berkeley, California:

1. "Six Days on the Road" (Earl Green, Carl Montgomery) – 3:33
2. "Henry" (John Dawson) – 3:47
3. "What's Made Milwaukee Famous" (Glenn Sutton) – 5:05
4. "I've Got a Tiger by the Tail" (Harlan Howard, Buck Owens) – 3:54
5. "Don't Take Any Chances" (Dawson) – 6:53
6. "Connection" (Mick Jagger, Keith Richards) – 4:37
7. "Delilah" (Dawson) – 4:12

Bonus tracks – set 1:

8. "A-11" (Hank Cochran) – 5:28
9. "Garden of Eden" (Dawson) – 5:22
10. "Hello Trouble" (Orville Couch, Eddie McDuff) – 4:32
11. "Last Lonely Eagle" (Dawson) – 5:20
12. "Whatcha Gonna Do" (Dawson) – 4:19

Disc 2

August 1, 1969 (set 2), continued:

1. "Zebra Dun" (traditional, arranged by Dawson) – 3:39
2. Jerry explains his instrument – 2:44
3. "Kaw-Liga" (Hank Williams, Fred Rose) – 4:25
4. "Sweet Lovin' One" (Dawson) – 4:48
5. "Fair Chance to Know" (Dawson) – 5:33
6. "Long Black Limousine" (Vern Stovall, Bobby George) – 4:38
7. "All I Ever Wanted" (Dawson) – 6:12
8. "Truck Drivin' Man" (Terry Fell) – 3:56
9. "The Lady Came from Baltimore" (Tim Hardin) – 4:40
10. "Games People Play" (Joe South) – 5:11
11. Introducing the Murdering Punks
12. "To Have the Hurting End" (Dawson) – 6:10
13. "I Am Your Man" (Dawson) – 4:42
14. "Henry" (Dawson) – 3:48

Disc 3

August 28, 1969 – Family Dog at the Great Highway, San Francisco, California:

1. "Six Days on the Road" (Green, Montgomery) – 3:38
2. "I Am Your Man" (Dawson) – 4:11
3. "Last Lonely Eagle (Dawson) – 6:16
4. "Whatcha Gonna Do" (Dawson) – 4:40
5. Introducing the famous Bobby Ace – 4:03
6. "Mama Tried" (Merle Haggard) – 4:13 (Note: with Bob Weir – guitar, vocals)
7. "Cathy's Clown" (Don Everly, Phil Everly) – 4:28
8. "Old Old House" (Hal Bynum, George Jones) – 3:57
9. "Me and My Uncle" (John Phillips) – 3:58
10. "Seasons of My Heart" (Jones, Darrell Edwards) – 3:52
11. "Slewfoot" (Howard Hausey) – 3:31

Bonus tracks – August 29, 1969:

12. "To Have the Hurting End" (Dawson) – 5:22
13. "Games People Play" (South) – 6:59

Bonus tracks – August 30, 1969:

14. "Superman" (Dawson) – 4:33
15. "Saw Mill" (Horace Whatley, Mel Tillis) – 2:54

Disc 4

October 14, 1969 – Mandrake's, Berkeley, California:

1. "Only Daddy That'll Walk the Line" (Jimmy Bryant) – 2:31
2. "Fair Chance to Know" (Dawson) – 5:02
3. "Mama Tried" (Haggard) – 3:47
4. "I Still Miss Someone" (Johnny Cash, Roy Cash) – 7:26
5. "Crossover" (Dawson) – 5:42
6. "The Weight" (Robbie Robertson) – 9:13

Bonus tracks – October 15, 1969:

7. "Garden of Eden" (Dawson) – 7:48
8. "Long Black Veil" (Marijohn Wilkin, Danny Dill) – 6:48 (Note: with Will Scarlett – harmonica)
9. "Death and Destruction" (Dawson) – 13:32

Disc 5

June 4, 1970 – Fillmore West, San Francisco, California:

1. "Henry" (Dawson) – 4:31
2. "Fair Chance to Know" (Dawson) – 6:07
3. "The Race Is On" (Don Rollins) – 4:35
4. "Mama Tried" (Haggard) – 3:20
5. "Honky Tonk Women" (Jagger, Richards) – 5:52

Bonus tracks – June 5, 1970:

6. "I Don't Know You" (Dawson) – 4:48
7. "Superman" (Dawson) – 3:55
8. "If You Hear Me When I'm Leaving" (Dawson) – 4:55
9. "Louisiana Lady" (Dawson) – 4:46
10. "The Weight" (Robertson) – 6:53

Bonus track – June 7, 1970:

11. "Portland Woman" (Dawson) – 5:07

== Personnel ==
New Riders of the Purple Sage

- John "Marmaduke" Dawson – guitar, vocals
- David Nelson – guitar, vocals
- Jerry Garcia – pedal steel guitar, vocals
- Bob Matthews – bass (disc 1 – 4)
- Dave Torbert – bass, vocals (disc 5)
- Mickey Hart – drums

Additional musicians

- Bob Weir – guitar, vocals
- Will Scarlet – harmonica

Production

- Recording: Owsley Stanley
- Mastering: Jeffrey Norman
- Tape to digital transfers: John Chester, Jamie Howarth
- Design: Bob Minkin
- Illustration: Nina Stanley, Starfinder Stanley
- Photography: Jeffrey Kilman, Michael Parrish
- Liner notes: Starfinder Stanley, Rob Bleetstein, Pete Bell, Hawk

== See also ==
- List of 2020 albums
