= Who Are Those Guys? =

Studio album by New Riders of the Purple Sage
- Released: 1977
- Recorded: 1976
- Genre: Country rock
- Length: 29:28
- Label: MCA
- Producer: Bob Johnston

New Riders of the Purple Sage chronology
New Riders (1976)	Who Are Those Guys? (1977)	Marin County Line (1977)

Singles from Who Are Those Guys?
- 1. ""Love Has Strange Ways" / "Red Hot Women and Ice Cold Beer""; 2. ""(Just) Another Night in Reno" / "Home Grown""

Professional ratings
Review scores
Source	Rating
AllMusic	1.5/5 stars
The New Rolling Stone Record Guide	1/5 stars

Who Are Those Guys? is the eighth studio album and tenth album overall by the country rock band the New Riders of the Purple Sage. It was recorded at the Record Plant in Sausalito, California, in October and November 1976. It was produced by Bob Johnston, and released by MCA Records in 1977.

Who Are Those Guys? was the first New Riders album to feature Stephen Love on bass guitar. The band's previous bass player, Skip Battin, had left to join the Flying Burrito Brothers. Love, a former member of Rick Nelson's Stone Canyon Band, wrote three of the songs on the album, and sings lead on six of the album's ten tracks. A fourth original song, "Home Grown", was written by drummer Spencer Dryden. The NRPS lineup for Who Are Those Guys? also included John "Marmaduke" Dawson, David Nelson, and Buddy Cage. Until Where I Come From was released in 2009, this was the only New Riders album that did not have any songs written by Dawson.

== Track listing ==
1. "I Can Heal You" (Jake Holmes) – 3:20
2. "High Rollers" (Boyd Berlin, Terry Melcher) – 2:46
3. "Peggy Sue" (Buddy Holly, Jerry Allison, Norman Petty) – 2:37
4. "(Just) Another Night in Reno" (Stephen Love) – 2:57
5. "It Never Hurts to Be Nice to Somebody" (Michael McGinnis) – 3:02
6. "Love Has Strange Ways" (Love) – 2:47
7. "Hold On It's Coming" (Country Joe McDonald) – 4:15
8. "By and By when I Need You" (Love) – 2:08
9. "Home Grown" (Spencer Dryden) – 2:35
10. "Red Hot Women and Ice Cold Beer" (Cy Coben) – 2:40

== Personnel ==
=== New Riders of the Purple Sage ===
- John Dawson – rhythm guitar, vocals
- David Nelson – lead guitar, vocals
- Buddy Cage – pedal steel guitar
- Stephen Love – bass, vocals
- Spencer Dryden – drums

=== Additional musicians ===
- John Hug – guitar
- Bill Stewart – drums

=== Production ===
- Bob Johnston – producer
- Jim Ed Norman – arranging
- Tom Flye – engineer
- Steve Fontano – assistant engineer
- Phil Fewsmith – front and back cover art (photography and hand coloring)
