= New Riders =

New Riders may refer to:

- New Riders of the Purple Sage, an American country rock band formed in 1969
- New Riders (album), a 1976 album by the New Riders of the Purple Sage
- New Riders Press, a publishing imprint of Peachpit
