= Marin County Line =

Studio album by New Riders of the Purple Sage
- Released: 1977
- Recorded: 1977
- Genre: Country rock
- Length: 36:18
- Label: MCA
- Producer: Jim Ed Norman

New Riders of the Purple Sage chronology
Who Are Those Guys? (1977)	Marin County Line (1977)	Feelin' All Right (1981)

Professional ratings
Review scores
Source	Rating
Allmusic	2/5 stars

Marin County Line is the ninth studio album and eleventh album overall by the country rock band the New Riders of the Purple Sage. Released in 1977, it was their third and final album on the MCA Records label.

Marin County Line was the second of two NRPS studio albums to feature Stephen Love on bass guitar. Love wrote all of the songs on side one of the LP. It was also the band's first album with Patrick Shanahan. Shanahan had recently replaced Spencer Dryden as the New Riders' drummer, and Dryden had become the band's manager. Love and Shanahan were both former members of Rick Nelson's Stone Canyon Band. Also in the NRPS lineup for this album were co-founders John "Marmaduke" Dawson and David Nelson, and long-time member Buddy Cage. A concert performed by this version of the band was released in 2009 as the album Winterland, San Francisco, CA, 12/31/77.

== Track listing ==
Side one

1. "Till I Met You" (Stephen Love) – 3:23
2. "Llywelyn" (Love) – 3:59
3. "Knights and Queens" (Love) – 3:59
4. "Green Eyes a Flashing" (Love) – 2:54
5. "Oh, What a Night" (Love) – 3:55

Side two

1. "A Good Woman Likes to Drink with the Boys" (Dave Ellingson) – 4:12
2. "Jasper" (John Dawson, David Nelson) – 2:38
3. "Echoes" (Patrick Shanahan) – 3:04
4. "Twenty Good Men" (Dawson) – 3:29
5. "Little Miss Bad" (Dawson) – 2:20
6. "Take a Red" (Nelson, Spencer Dryden) – 2:25

== Personnel ==
=== New Riders of the Purple Sage ===
- John Dawson – guitar, harmonica, vocals
- David Nelson – guitar, vocals
- Buddy Cage – pedal steel guitar
- Stephen Love – bass, guitar, vocals
- Patrick Shanahan – drums, vibes, percussion, vocals

=== Additional musicians ===
- Spencer Dryden – percussion
- John Hug – guitar
- Tom Stern – banjo
- Ray Park – fiddle
- Tower of Power horn section – horns on "Take a Red"

=== Production ===
- Jim Ed Norman – producer
- Tom Flye – engineer
- Steve Fontano – associate engineer
- Alex Kashevaroff – assistant engineer
- Larry Boden – mastering
- George Osaki – art direction
- Herb Greene – photography
