= Live in Japan (New Riders of the Purple Sage album) =

Live album by New Riders of the Purple Sage
- Released: 1994
- Recorded: 1993
- Genre: Country rock
- Length: 56:35
- Label: Relix
- Producer: Rusty Gauthier

New Riders of the Purple Sage chronology
Live on Stage (1993)	Live in Japan (1994)	Wasted Tasters (1994)

Live in Japan is an album by the country rock band the New Riders of the Purple Sage. It was recorded from August 25 to August 29, 1993, at Club Citta in Kawasaki, the Bottom Line in Nagoya, and Banana Hall in Osaka. It was released by Relix Records on September 27, 1994.

Live in Japan includes performances of three Grateful Dead songs — "Dire Wolf", "Ripple", and "Friend of the Devil".

== Track listing ==
1. "Henry" (John Dawson) – 4:16
2. "Dire Wolf" (Jerry Garcia, Robert Hunter) – 3:41
3. "Rainbow" (Dawson) – 4:07
4. "Early in the Morning" (traditional) – 9:50
5. "Keep On Keepin' On" (Dawson) – 6:02
6. "Ripple" (Garcia, Hunter) – 6:20
7. "I Don't Know You" (Dawson) – 3:47
8. "Friend of the Devil" (Garcia, Dawson, Hunter) – 5:35
9. "Portland Woman" (Dawson) – 12:58

== Personnel ==
=== New Riders of the Purple Sage ===
- John Dawson – acoustic guitar, harmonica, vocals
- Rusty Gauthier – electric guitar, acoustic guitar, violin, vocals
- Gary Vogensen – electric guitar, vocals

=== Production ===
- Rusty Gauthier – producer, mixing
- Carolyn Gauthier – recording
- Evana Gerstman – graphic art and design
- John Dawson, Elanna Wyn Ellis – cover concept
- Sadayoshi Sukegawa – photographs
