= Feelin' All Right =

Studio album by New Riders of the Purple Sage
- Released: 1981
- Genre: Country rock
- Length: 30:46
- Label: A&M
- Producer: Chuck Mellone

New Riders of the Purple Sage chronology
Marin County Line (1977)	Feelin' All Right (1981)	Before Time Began (1986)

Singles from Feelin' All Right
- 1. ""Night for Making Love" / "Fly Right""; 2. ""No Other Love" / "Full Moon at Midnight""

Professional ratings
Review scores
Source	Rating
Allmusic	2/5 stars

Feelin' All Right is the tenth studio album and twelfth album overall by the country rock band the New Riders of the Purple Sage. Released in 1981, it was their only album on the A&M Records label. Produced as a vinyl LP, it has not been released in CD format.

Feelin' All Right was the last studio album by the New Riders that featured both John "Marmaduke" Dawson and David Nelson as full-time band members (although Nelson made a guest appearance on 1992's Midnight Moonlight). The two had co-founded the band in 1969 with Jerry Garcia of the Grateful Dead. Also included in the lineup was longtime member Buddy Cage on pedal steel guitar, along with guitarist Allen Kemp and drummer Patrick Shanahan. Kemp wrote or co-wrote seven of the ten songs on the album, his first as a member of NRPS.

== Track listing ==
Side one:

1. "Night for Making Love" (John Dawson, David Nelson, Allen Kemp) – 3:12
2. "No Other Love" (Dawson, Kemp) – 3:02
3. "The Way She Dances" (Dawson, Kemp) – 2:49
4. "Tell Me" (Kemp) – 3:26
5. "Fly Right" (Kemp) – 3:09

Side two:

1. "Crazy Little Girl" (Dawson, Kemp) – 3:20
2. "Full Moon at Midnight" (Dawson, Kemp) – 3:20
3. "Pakalolo Man" (Jack Miller) – 2:42
4. "Day Dreamin' Girl" (M. O'Gara) – 2:56
5. "Saralyn" (Dawson) – 2:50

== Personnel ==
=== New Riders of the Purple Sage ===
- John Dawson – guitar, vocals
- David Nelson – guitar, vocals
- Buddy Cage – pedal steel guitar
- Allen Kemp – guitar, vocals
- Patrick Shanahan – drums, vocals

=== Additional musicians ===
- Michael White – bass
- Andre Lewis – synthesizer

=== Production ===
- Chuck Mellone – producer
- Alex Kash – engineer
- Jim Tronge – assistant engineer
- Dave Curtin – assistant engineer
- Frank DeLuna – mastering
- Ed Caraeff – photography, design
- Frank Fenter – executive supervision for Fast Forward Productions, Inc
- Recorded at the Record Plant, Sausalito, California
