= New Riders (album) =

Studio album by New Riders of the Purple Sage
- Released: 1976
- Recorded: April 1976; The Record Plant, Sausalito, California
- Genre: Country rock
- Length: 31:15
- Label: MCA
- Producer: Bob Johnston

New Riders of the Purple Sage chronology
The Best of New Riders of the Purple Sage (1976)	New Riders (1976)	Who Are Those Guys? (1977)

Singles from New Riders
- 1. ""Fifteen Days Under the Hood" / "Don't Put Her Down""; 2. ""Dead Flowers" / "She's Looking Better Every Beer""

Professional ratings
Review scores
Source	Rating
Allmusic	3/5 stars

New Riders is an album by the country rock band the New Riders of the Purple Sage. Their seventh studio album and their ninth album overall, it was recorded and released in 1976.

New Riders was the New Riders' first album on the MCA Records label, and their second to be produced by Bob Johnston. It consists of nine cover songs, plus one new original tune by John Dawson.

== Track listing ==
1. "Fifteen Days under the Hood" (Jack Tempchin) – 2:42
2. "Annie May" (Vick Thomas) – 3:26
3. "You Never Can Tell" (Chuck Berry) – 3:52
4. "Hard to Handle" (Otis Redding, Al Bell, Allen Jones) – 3:38
5. "Dead Flowers" (Mick Jagger, Keith Richards) – 3:56
6. "Don't Put Her Down" (Hazel Dickens) – 4:12
7. "Honky Tonkin' (I Guess I Done Me Some)" (Delbert McClinton) – 2:47
8. "She's Looking Better Every Beer" (John Shine) – 2:38
9. "Can't Get Over You" (John Dawson) – 2:03
10. "The Swimming Song" (Loudon Wainwright III) – 2:01

== Personnel ==
=== New Riders of the Purple Sage ===
- John Dawson – rhythm guitar, vocals
- David Nelson – lead guitar, vocals
- Buddy Cage – pedal steel guitar
- Skip Battin – bass, vocals
- Spencer Dryden – drums

=== Production ===
- Bob Johnston – producer
- Tom Flye – engineer
- Eric Schilling – assistant engineer
- Rod Dyer – album design
- George Osaki – art direction
