= Once upon a Time (Marty Stuart album) =

Studio album by Marty Stuart
- Released: 1992
- Genres: Bluegrass; country
- Language: English
- Label: CMH

Marty Stuart chronology
Tempted (1991)	Once upon a Time (1992)	This One's Gonna Hurt You (1992)

Once upon a Time is the sixth studio album of country/bluegrass singer Marty Stuart. The album is mostly acoustic, featuring mainly bluegrass songs and Marty Stuart's mandolin. It is a retrospective of Stuart's teenage work during his time with Lester Flatt and Nashville Grass; the All Music Guide to Country describes the album as "certainly a special compilation" of a "true musical treasure" that "documents the early years and provides a glimpse into the development of an artist of character and quality."

== Track listing ==
No.	Title	Writer(s)	Performer	Length
1.	"Take a Little Time"	Marty Stuart, T. Michael Coleman	Marty Stuart
2.	"Dim Lights, Thick Smoke (and Loud, Loud Music)"	Joe Maphis, Rose Lee Maphis, Max Fidler	Marty Stuart
3.	"Orange Blossom Special" (Live)	Ervin T. Rouse	Marty Stuart & Clarence 'Tater' Tate
4.	"Mother Maybelle"	Joe Maphis, Rose Lee Maphis	Marty Stuart & Johnny Cash
5.	"The Bluebirds Are Singing for Me"	Lester Flatt, Mac Wiseman	Marty Stuart
6.	"Till the End of the World Rolls Around"	Flatt, Newton Thomas	Marty Stuart
7.	"Roanoke"	Joe Ahr	Marty Stuart
8.	"Cannonball Blues"	M. Christian	Marty Stuart
9.	"I Don't Love Nobody"	Flatt	Marty Stuart
10.	"The Sun's Coming Up"	Dee Gaskin	Marty Stuart
11.	"What Would You Give in Exchange for Your Soul?"	M. Christian	Marty Stuart & Curly Seckler
12.	"Bluegrass Shuffle"	M. Christian	Marty Stuart
13.	"Black Mountain Rag"	T. Magness	Marty Stuart
14.	"Somebody Loves You Darlin'"	Wiley Morris, Zeke Morris	Marty Stuart & Curly Seckler
15.	"Sugar Lee"	Braxton Holmes	Marty Stuart
16.	"Two in the Morning"	M. Christian	Marty Stuart

== Personnel ==
- Johnny Cash – vocals on "Mother Maybelle"
- Pete Corum – bass, background vocals
- Lester Flatt – vocals on "The Bluebirds Are Singing for Me"
- Kenny Ingram – banjo, background vocals
- Curly Seckler – rhythm guitar, mandolin, background vocals, lead vocals on "What Would You Give In Exchange For Your Soul?" and "Somebody Loves You Darlin'"
- Marty Stuart – acoustic guitar, mandolin, lead vocals, background vocals
- Clarence "Tater" Tate – fiddle, background vocals, lead vocals on "Orange Blossom Special"
- Blake Williams – five-string banjo
