= Zebra Dun =

Song
- Written: c. 1890
- Published: 1908
- Genre: Western ballad
- Songwriter(s): Unknown

"Zebra Dun" is a traditional American cowboy song from at least as early as 1890. Jack Thorp said he collected it from Randolph Reynolds at Carrizzozo Flats in that year. The song tells of a stranger who came upon a cowboy camp at the head of the Cimarron River. When he asks to borrow a "fat saddle horse", the cowboys fix him up:

Now old Dunny was an outlaw, he'd grown so awful wild
He could paw the moon down, he could jump a mile;
Old Dunny stood right still there, like as he didn't know
Till the stranger had him saddled and ready for to go.
When the stranger hit the saddle, then old Dun he quit the earth,
And started travelin' upwards for all that he was worth,
A-yellin' and a-squealin' and a-having wall-eyed fits
His front feet perpendicular, his hind feet in the bits.

Thorp published the song under the title "Educated Feller" in 1908. Two years later, John Lomax published a substantially longer version as "Zebra Dun" in Cowboy Songs and Other Frontier Ballads. "Zebra Dun" was one of the most popular songs among the cowboys and is included in many song books. In 1928, Jules Verne Allen was the first to record it.

== Bibliography ==
- Lomax, John A., M.A. Cowboy Songs and Other Frontier Ballads. The MacMillan Company, 1918. Online edition (pdf)
- Russell, Tony. Country Music Records: A Discography, 1921-1942. Oxford University Press, 2004. ISBN 0-19-513989-5
- Thorp, N. Howard "Jack". Songs of the Cowboys. Houghton Mifflin Company, 1908, 1921.
