= Oh, What a Mighty Time =

Studio album by New Riders of the Purple Sage
- Released: 1975
- Recorded: 1975
- Genre: Country rock
- Length: 38:18
- Label: Columbia
- Producer: Bob Johnston

New Riders of the Purple Sage chronology
Brujo (1974)	Oh, What a Mighty Time (1975)	The Best of New Riders of the Purple Sage (1976)

Professional ratings
Review scores
Source	Rating
Allmusic	2/5 stars

Oh, What a Mighty Time is an album by the country rock band New Riders of the Purple Sage. Their sixth studio album and their seventh album overall, it was released by Columbia Records in 1975.

Oh, What a Mighty Time was produced by Bob Johnston. Jerry Garcia of the Grateful Dead plays guitar on three songs, and Sly Stone plays keyboards and sings on one song.

== Track listing ==
1. "Mighty Time" (Don Nix) – 5:13
2. "I Heard You Been Layin' My Old Lady" (Russell Wier) – 3:24
3. "Strangers on a Train" (Skip Battin, Kim Fowley) – 2:45
4. "Up Against the Wall, Redneck Mother" (Ray Wylie Hubbard) – 4:13
5. "Take a Letter, Maria" (R. B. Greaves) – 4:07
6. "Little Old Lady" (Richard Wilbur) – 2:52
7. "On Top of Old Smoky" (traditional, arranged and adapted by Frank Wakefield) – 2:39
8. "Over and Over" (John Dawson) – 3:08
9. "La Bamba" (Ritchie Valens) – 3:44
10. "Going Round the Horn" (Dawson, Wakefield) – 3:33
11. "Farewell, Angelina" (Bob Dylan) – 2:42

== Personnel ==
=== New Riders of the Purple Sage ===
- John Dawson – guitars, vocals, autoharp, mouth harp, baby guitar, percussion, Acme siren
- David Nelson – guitars, vocals, percussion, regular tuning Heineken's bottle
- Buddy Cage – pedal steel, vocal
- Skip Battin – bass, vocals, percussion
- Spencer Dryden – drums, percussion, vocal

=== Additional musicians ===
- Sly Stone – vocals, organ, piano on "Mighty Time"
- Jerry Garcia – guitar on "Mighty Time", "I Heard You Been Layin' My Old Lady", and "Take a Letter, Maria"
- Jeff Narell – steel drum on "Over and Over"
- Pepper Watkins, Bootche Anderson, Marilyn Scott – vocals on "I Heard You Been Layin' My Old Lady", "Strangers on a Train", "Up Against the Wall, Redneck", and "Take a Letter, Maria"
- Ray Park – fiddle on "Going Round the Horn"
- St. Beulah's Church Choir – vocals on "Mighty Time"
- Portion of Glide Memorial Church Choir – vocals on "Mighty Time"
- Patty Santos Cockrell, Peña Blanca, Lucha Cardenas – vocals on "Over and Over", and "La Bamba"
- The Senator – vocals on "Over and Over"
- Andrea Ahlgren – vocals on "Over and Over"

=== Production ===
- Bob Johnston – producer
- Joe Garnett – front cover illustration
- Ron Kriss – back cover illustration
- Herb Greene – cover and inside photography
- Tyler Thornton – back cover photography
- Bob DeSantos – color prints
- Ron Coro – design
