= Stephen A. Love =

American musician

Stephen A. Love is an American musician, producer and CEO. He lives near New York City and in Puerto Vallarta, Jalisco, Mexico.

Love has multiple references in the old and new Rolling Stone Encyclopedia of Rock & Roll, The Great Rock Discography by Martin C. Strong, Cuts from a San Francisco Rock Journal by Debora Hill, San Francisco Rock by Jack McDonough with the NRPS, "Desperados" The Roots of Country Rock, "Blues Network Greece" by Michael Liminios "BAM" Bay Area Music, Relix magazine and many other online or physical publications.

== Early days ==
Love joined bands in high school in Pittsburgh, Pennsylvania, starting with The Third Edition. In college at Scottsbluff, Nebraska, he met Randy Meisner who was working with Rick Nelson, and they traveled to Hollywood. Meisner joined the Linda Ronstadt band which became The Eagles. Love took up bass guitar and vocals for Rick Nelson in the Stone Canyon Band at age 20.

== Musical career ==
Love's musical achievements have included the industry's highest awards including RIAA certification, gold, platinum and multi platinum recording for Garden Party with Ricky Nelson and the Stone Canyon Band. The record sold more than eight million copies worldwide and ranked number one on Billboard Adult contemporary and number six on the industries Billboard chart. Rick Nelson awarded Stephen' song "Let It Bring You Along" as the first song on the "Garden Party" album. Love was a member of "Roger McGuinn Band " for three years, later to be billed as "The Byrds" on tour. All the famous songs recorded by "The Byrds" were performed nightly encompassing over 800 concerts in the US and Europe for three years. He composed the opening song of the album once again "Somebody Loves You" sang in unison with original Byrd leader Roger McGuinn. In 1976, Love joined as bassist/guitarist/lead singer the internationally known "New Riders of the Purple Sage" originally including Jerry Garcia from The Grateful Dead recording two albums with "Another Night In Reno" as the single released on "Who Are Those Guys" and composing the entire side of "Marin County Line" produced by Jim Ed Norman.

He performed at the biggest concert of the year in 1977 with the New Riders of the Purple Sage, the Grateful Dead, and the Marshall Tucker Band in Englishtown, New Jersey. More than 125,000 people were in attendance. He performed in concerts at the Royal Albert Hall in London, Hyde Park, London, Madison Square Garden in New York, and Wachovia Spectrum in Philadelphia. He has appeared on television shows including Larry King, The Tonight Show Starring Johnny Carson, McCloud starring Dennis Weaver, In Concert, Saturday Night Live, Biography with Ricky Nelson, the Kenny Rogers Show, CBS, NBC, ABC evening news, Don Kirchner's Rock Concert, Nashville, BBC Live in London, and Australian, Italian and German television. Animal Planet has used his music.

In mid July 2017, "Number One Son of a Gun" written by Stephen A Love, was released on the entertainment industries "Radio Submit" chart, featuring David Fitz on drums and went directly to the top of the full weekly chart, monthly chart and alltime chart holding its position for five months, plus twenty 98% consecutive weekly charts as of December 20, 2017. Love's 2014 release, had three original songs, "Mr. Love" "Like a Dead End Street", and "Its Rockabilly Music We Love".

Love's European hit single released in the spring of 2011 "Never Be Anyone Else But You" was awarded number one on two of the independent country music charts in the world. Spending more than 22 months on major charts, it peaked in January and February 2012. In addition the European ECMA has awarded "Never Be Anyone Else But You" number one the week of January 12, 2012 and continuing for two consecutive weeks more.

Just Love's Hot Country Tour I, began in Amsterdam, Holland on September 1, 2011, encompassing seven European countries and 16 international disc jockeys. Just Love's Hot Country Tour II, began in Saltzburg, Austria on June 6, 2012, encompassing eight European countries and 12 international disc jockeys. On October 29, 2014 "Mr. Love" was released by Blue Jeans Music in the United States, Europe, Australia and Asia. In mid-January 2012, Blue Jeans Music released Love's single "Travelin' Man" in Europe. It became number one on the Indiworld Country chart (May 18, 2012). On May 21, 2012, Blue Jeans Music released Love's single "Lonesome Town", which reached number 4 on the ECMA European Country Music Association Top 100. Stephen A Love's company "James Allen Promotion" promoted the Number One single in 2013 'Full Circle" written by Gene Clark and performed by the "Piedmont Brothers Band".

== Discography ==
Albums:

- Garden Party – Rick Nelson and the Stone Canyon Band (1972)
- Roger McGuinn & Band – Roger McGuinn (1975)
- Who Are Those Guys? – New Riders of the Purple Sage (1977)
- Marin County Line – New Riders of the Purple Sage (1977)
- Winterland, San Francisco, CA, 12/31/77 – New Riders of the Purple Sage (2009)
- Things Get a Bit Twisted – Stephen A. Love (2015)
- Always Within Kissin Range – Stephen A. Love (2018)
- Hempsteader – New Riders of the Purple Sage (2024)
