= Gypsy Cowboy =

Studio album by New Riders of the Purple Sage
- Released: December 1972
- Recorded: 1972
- Genre: Country rock
- Length: 41:32
- Label: Columbia
- Producer: Stephen Barncard

New Riders of the Purple Sage chronology
Powerglide (1972)	Gypsy Cowboy (1972)	The Adventures of Panama Red (1973)

Singles from Gypsy Cowboy
- 1. ""Groupie" / "She's No Angel""

Professional ratings
Review scores
Source	Rating
Allmusic	3/5 stars
Variety	(favourable)

Gypsy Cowboy is the third album by the country rock band the New Riders of the Purple Sage. It was recorded and released in 1972.

The album includes six original songs by John Dawson and three by Dave Torbert, plus cover versions of country classics "She's No Angel" and "Long Black Veil". Donna Jean Godchaux of the Grateful Dead sings background vocals on two songs, "Whiskey" and "Long Black Veil". One single was released in conjunction with the album — "Groupie" / "She's No Angel".

In 2007, Gypsy Cowboy was re-released on the Wounded Bird Records label, with four bonus tracks. These were live versions of "Groupie", "Sutter's Mill", "Superman", and "She's No Angel". All except "Superman" were from the New Riders' 1974 album Home, Home on the Road.

== Track listing ==
1. "Gypsy Cowboy" (Dave Torbert) – 4:17
2. "Whiskey" (John Dawson) – 3:33
3. "Groupie" (Torbert) – 2:40
4. "Sutter's Mill" (Dawson) – 1:52
5. "Death and Destruction" (Dawson) – 8:39
6. "Linda" (Dawson) – 3:04
7. "On My Way Back Home" (Torbert) – 3:29
8. "Superman" (Dawson) – 3:09
9. "She's No Angel" (Wanda Ballman) – 2:51
10. "Long Black Veil" (Danny Dill, Marijohn Wilkin) – 3:56
11. "Sailin'" (Dawson) – 2:49

== Personnel ==
=== New Riders of the Purple Sage ===
- John Dawson – rhythm guitar, lead vocals on "Whiskey", "Sutter's Mill", "Death and Destruction", "Linda", "Superman", 1st joint lead vocal on "Long Black Veil", and "Sailin'"
- David Nelson – lead guitar, dobro, mandolin, bagpipes, lead vocals on "She's No Angel", 2nd joint lead vocal on "Long Black Veil"
- Dave Torbert – bass, acoustic guitar, lead vocals on "Gypsy Cowboy", "Groupie", and "On My Way Back Home", 3rd joint lead vocal on "Long Black Veil"
- Buddy Cage – pedal steel guitar
- Spencer Dryden – drums

=== Additional musicians ===
- Darlene DiDomenico – backing vocals on "Whiskey", "On My Way Back Home", and "Superman"
- Donna Jean Godchaux – backing vocals on "She's No Angel", and "Long Black Veil"
- Richard Greene – violin
- Mark Naftalin – piano
- Jack Schroer – saxophone

=== Production ===
- Producer: Stephen Barncard and NRPS
- Recording Engineers: Stephen Barncard, Dave Brown, Ellen Burke
- Cover Art: Lore Orion
- Liner notes: John Tobler
