= Powerglide (album) =

Studio album by New Riders of the Purple Sage
- Released: March 1972
- Recorded: 1972
- Genre: Country rock
- Length: 43:05
- Label: Columbia
- Producer: Stephen Barncard

New Riders of the Purple Sage chronology
| New Riders of the Purple Sage (1971) | Powerglide (1972) | Gypsy Cowboy (1972) |

Singles from Powerglide
- 1. ""I Don't Need No Doctor" / "Runnin' Back to You""; 2. ""Dim Lights, Thick Smoke (And Loud, Loud Music)" / "Rainbow""

Professional ratings
Review scores
| Source | Rating |
|---|---|
| Allmusic | 4/5 stars |
| Christgau's Record Guide | C− |

Powerglide is the second album by the American band the New Riders of the Purple Sage. The music is a psychedelic hybrid of country rock, and includes guest musicians Jerry Garcia and Bill Kreutzmann from the Grateful Dead, along with noted session player Nicky Hopkins. The album contains six original tunes by the band, plus covers such as "I Don't Need No Doctor", "Hello Mary Lou", and "Willie and the Hand Jive".

Powerglide was the first New Riders album to feature Buddy Cage, who had replaced Garcia as the New Riders' pedal steel guitar player. It was the band's highest-charting album, reaching number 33 on the Billboard 200.

== Artwork ==
The album cover artwork for Powerglide was done by Alton Kelley and Stanley Mouse, under the name Kelly and Mouse Studios.

The original LP contained a 12 inch by 12 inch heavy paper insert with the album credits. The artwork for the insert was drawn by Lore Orion, then known as Lore Shoberg. It is a caricature that portrays the band members as Western outlaws. Depicted from left to right are David Nelson, John Dawson, Spencer Dryden, Dave Torbert, and Buddy Cage.

== Track listing ==
1. "Dim Lights, Thick Smoke (And Loud, Loud Music)" (Joe Maphis, Max Fidler, Rose Lee Maphis) – 4:15
2. "Rainbow" (John Dawson) – 3:05
3. "California Day" (Dave Torbert) – 2:40
4. "Sweet Lovin' One" (Dawson) – 2:30
5. "Lochinvar" (Dawson) – 3:33
6. "I Don't Need No Doctor" (Nick Ashford, Valerie Simpson, Jo Armstead) – 4:47
7. "Contract" (Torbert) – 3:10
8. "Runnin' Back to You" (Dawson) – 4:12
9. "Hello Mary Lou" (Gene Pitney, Cayet Mangiaracina) – 2:58
10. "Duncan and Brady" (trad., arranged by John Koerner) – 5:23
11. "Willie and the Hand Jive" (Johnny Otis) – 6:50

== Personnel ==
=== New Riders of the Purple Sage ===
- John Dawson – acoustic and electric rhythm guitars, vocals, lead vocals on "Rainbow", "Sweet Lovin' One", "Lochinvar", "Runnin' Back to You", "Duncan and Brady"
- David Nelson – lead guitar, vocals, mandolin on "Runnin' Back to You", lead vocal on "Dim Lights, Thick Smoke"
- Dave Torbert – bass, vocals, electric rhythm guitar, acoustic guitar on "California Day" and "Hello Mary Lou", piano on "Duncan and Brady", lead vocals on "California Day", "I Don't Need No Doctor", "Contract", "Hello Mary Lou", and "Willie and the Hand Jive"
- Buddy Cage – pedal steel guitar, dobro on "Lochinvar" and "Duncan and Brady"
- Spencer Dryden – drums, percussion, broom, whistle, and whoopee on "Duncan and Brady"

=== Additional musicians ===
- Nicky Hopkins – piano on "Dim Lights, Thick Smoke", "California Day", "I Don't Need No Doctor", "Contract", "Runnin' Back to You", "Willie and the Hand Jive"
- Jerry Garcia – banjo on "Sweet Lovin' One", "Duncan and Brady"; piano on "Lochinvar"
- Billy Kreutzmann – percussion on "Duncan and Brady", "Willie and the Hand Jive"
- Peoples chorus on "Duncan and Brady" – Nelson, McDuke, Buddy, Judy, Steve
- Riderettes on "I Don't Need No Doctor" – our boys in drag

=== Production ===
- Producer – Steve Barncard and the New Riders
- Engineer – John Fiore
- Second engineer – George Beauregard
- Mastering – Bob McCloud, Artisan Sound, Hollywood
- Outside album design – Kelly and Mouse Studios
- Inside artwork – Lore Shoberg
