= Brujo =

Studio album by New Riders of the Purple Sage
- Released: November 1974
- Recorded: 1974
- Genre: Country rock
- Length: 34:17
- Label: Columbia
- Producer: Ed Freeman

New Riders of the Purple Sage chronology
| Home, Home on the Road (1974) | Brujo (1974) | Oh, What a Mighty Time (1975) |

Singles from Brujo
- 1. ""You Angel You" / "Parson Brown""

Professional ratings
Review scores
| Source | Rating |
|---|---|
| Allmusic | 3/5 stars |

Brujo is an album by the American country rock band New Riders of the Purple Sage. It is their fifth studio album, and their sixth album overall. It was recorded in 1974 and released that same year by Columbia Records.

Brujo was the first New Riders album to feature ex-Byrd Skip Battin. Battin had replaced Dave Torbert as the New Riders' bass player after Torbert left to form Kingfish.

One single was released in conjunction with the album—"You Angel You"/"Parson Brown".

== Track listing ==
1. "Old Man Noll" (John Dawson) – 2:44
2. "Ashes of Love" (Jack Anglin, Johnnie Wright) – 2:14
3. "You Angel You" (Bob Dylan) – 2:43
4. "Instant Armadillo Blues" (Dawson) – 2:52
5. "Workingman's Woman" (Troy Seals, Will Jennings, Don Goodman) – 2:44
6. "On the Amazon" (Skip Battin, Kim Fowley) – 3:34
7. "Big Wheels" (Battin, Fowley) – 3:00
8. "Singing Cowboy" (Battin, Fowley) – 3:57
9. "Crooked Judge" (Robert Hunter, David Nelson) – 2:59
10. "Parson Brown" (Dawson) – 3:06
11. "Neon Rose" (Battin, Fowley) – 4:24

== Personnel ==
=== New Riders of the Purple Sage ===
- John Dawson - guitar, vocals
- David Nelson - guitar, mandolin, vocals
- Spencer Dryden - drums, vocals
- Skip Battin - bass, vocals
- Buddy Cage - steel guitar

=== Guest musicians ===
- Neil Larsen - keyboards
- Mark Naftalin - keyboards
- Ed Freeman - mellotron
- Dan Patiris - English horn
- Armando Peraza - bongos

=== Production ===
- Producer: Ed Freeman
- Recording Engineer: Bob Edwards/Kurt Kinzel
- Art Direction: n/a
- Photography: Urve Kuusik
- Artwork: Gage Taylor
