= New Riders of the Purple Sage (album) =

Studio album by New Riders of the Purple Sage
- Released: August 1971
- Recorded: December 1970 – January 1971
- Studio: Wally Heider Studios, San Francisco
- Genre: Country rock
- Length: 40:15
- Label: Columbia
- Producer: New Riders of the Purple Sage

New Riders of the Purple Sage chronology
New Riders of the Purple Sage (1971)	Powerglide (1972)

Jerry Garcia chronology
New Riders of the Purple Sage (1971)	Hooteroll? (1971)

Singles from New Riders of the Purple Sage
- 1. ""Louisiana Lady" / "Last Lonely Eagle""; 2. ""I Don't Know You" / "Garden of Eden""

Professional ratings
Review scores
Source	Rating
Allmusic	4.5/5 stars
Christgau's Record Guide	B+
The Music Box	4.5/5 stars
The Village Voice	A−

New Riders of the Purple Sage is the debut album by the American country rock band the New Riders of the Purple Sage. It was released by Columbia Records in 1971, and reached number 39 on the Billboard charts.

New Riders of the Purple Sage is the only studio album by the New Riders to feature co-founder Jerry Garcia of the Grateful Dead on pedal steel guitar. He is also featured on the live albums Vintage NRPS and Bear's Sonic Journals: Dawn of the New Riders of the Purple Sage.

Mickey Hart and Commander Cody play drums and piano, respectively, on two tracks—"Dirty Business" and "Last Lonely Eagle".

== Track listing ==
All songs written by John Dawson.

Side one

1. "I Don't Know You" – 2:26
2. "Whatcha Gonna Do" – 3:17
3. "Portland Woman" – 3:36
4. "Henry" – 2:36
5. "Dirty Business" – 7:56

Side two

1. "Glendale Train" – 3:00
2. "Garden of Eden" – 4:32
3. "All I Ever Wanted" – 4:37
4. "Last Lonely Eagle" – 5:12
5. "Louisiana Lady" – 3:03

Bonus tracks

These songs were recorded live at the Fillmore West and included in the 2003 CD reissue:

11. "Down in the Boondocks" (Joe South)
12. "The Weight" (Robbie Robertson)
13. "Superman" (Dawson)

== Charts ==
Chart (1971)	Position
United States (Billboard 200)	39
Australia (Kent Music Report)	48

== Personnel ==
New Riders of the Purple Sage

- John Dawson – acoustic guitar, vocals
- David Nelson – electric guitar, acoustic guitar, mandolin, vocals
- Dave Torbert – bass, acoustic guitar, vocals
- Jerry Garcia – pedal steel guitar, banjo
- Spencer Dryden – drums, percussion

Additional musicians

- Mickey Hart – drums, percussion on "Dirty Business", "Last Lonely Eagle"
- Commander Cody – piano on "Dirty Business", "Last Lonely Eagle"

Technical personnel

- New Riders of the Purple Sage – production
- Stephen Barncard – engineering, executive production
- Phil Lesh – executive production
- Ellen Burke – technician
- Michael Ferguson, Alton Kelly – cover art
