= Farewell, Angelina (song) =

Song by Bob Dylan

from the album The Bootleg Series Volumes 1-3 (Rare & Unreleased) 1961-1991
- Released: March 26, 1991
- Recorded: January 13, 1965
- Genre: Folk
- Length: 5:27
- Label: Columbia
- Songwriter: Bob Dylan
- Producer: Tom Wilson

"Farewell, Angelina" is a song written by Bob Dylan in the mid-1960s, and most famously recorded by Joan Baez.

== Inspiration ==
According to Bob Dylan: All the Songs, an 1850s Scottish sailors' song by George Scroggie titled Farewell to Tarwathie provided the skeleton of the song's melody. That song, in turn, had been inspired by the old traditional tune Wagoner's Lad.

== Recording ==
Dylan attempted to record "Farewell Angelina" only once, during the first session for his 1965 album Bringing It All Back Home, and he abandoned all attempts to record the song again. Dylan's one recording of the song was eventually issued in 1991 on The Bootleg Series Volumes 1–3 (Rare & Unreleased) 1961–1991 and again on The Bootleg Series Vol. 12: The Cutting Edge 1965–1966.

== Joan Baez's version ==
Joan Baez included this song on her 1965 album Farewell, Angelina. In the UK the song was issued at the same time as a single. Baez' version, though only about half as long as Dylan's recording, was very similar in structure and showed her moving away from pure folk music with the use of string bass accompaniment. Baez has often included performances of the song in her concerts, from 1965 through the 2010s. A live performance from the 1965 Newport Folk Festival appears on her album Live at Newport, and another live performance appears on Live Europe '83. An edited version of the Newport Folk Festival performance appears in the Murray Lerner documentary film Festival.

== Other versions ==
- The song has been recorded by the New Riders of the Purple Sage (on Oh, What a Mighty Time), John Mellencamp (on Rough Harvest), Tim O'Brien (See Nobody Sings Dylan Like Dylan, Vol. 39, masterfully collected by Jay Ess), Show of Hands, and Danu's When All is Said and Done.
- Pierre Delanoë and Hugues Aufray translated it into French under the title Adieu Angelina, which itself has been recorded many times. This French version of the song has been recorded by Nana Mouskouri (who also sang a version in German).
- An Italian version, under the title Addio Angelina, has been recorded in 1969 by Bobby Solo and included in the album Bobby Folk
- Jeff Buckley performed the song with Gary Lucas on in-studio appearances on WFMU and WFUV in the early 1990s.
- The Celtic jam band Wake the Dead recorded it in 2006 for their third album Blue Light Cheap Hotel. Bobby Bare recorded it on his 2012 album Darker Than Light.
- In 1997, it was translated and released as Biday Porichita by Bengali Singer-songwriter Kabir Suman.
- Gösta Rybrant wrote a Swedish translation (Farväl Angelina), first recorded in 1966 by Ann-Louise Hanson. Per Gessle recorded a version appearing on the 1985 album Scener. Another Swedish translation, (Adjö, Angelina) by Michael Wiehe appears on the 2007 album "Dylan på Svenska" (Dylan in Swedish) Mikael Wiehe & Ebba Forsberg.
- Devonian folk band Show of Hands recorded a version for their 1997 album Dark Fields, with Steve Knightley providing the vocals and main guitar, and Phil Beer joining on second guitar.
- Spanish rumba group Los Payos recorded their own rendition of the song in 1968.
- Scottish folk singer Barbara Dymock recorded the song for her album Hilbert's Hotel in 2011.
- Czech singer Robert Křesťan and the band Druhá Tráva released their translation of the song as "Sbohem, Angelino" in 2007 on the album Dylanovky (Dylans).
