= The Adventures of Panama Red =

Studio album by New Riders of the Purple Sage
- Released: October 1973
- Recorded: 1973
- Genre: Country rock; bluegrass
- Length: 29:51
- Label: Columbia
- Producer: Norbert Putnam

New Riders of the Purple Sage chronology
Gypsy Cowboy (1972)	The Adventures of Panama Red (1973)	Home, Home on the Road (1974)

Singles from The Adventures of Panama Red
- 1. ""Panama Red" / "Cement, Clay and Glass""

Professional ratings
Review scores
Source	Rating
Allmusic	3/5 stars
Christgau's Record Guide	C−

The Adventures of Panama Red is the fourth country rock album by the New Riders of the Purple Sage, released in 1973. It is widely regarded as one of the group's best efforts, and reached number 55 on the Billboard charts.

The album includes two songs written by Peter Rowan — "Panama Red", which became a radio hit, and "Lonesome L.A. Cowboy". Another song, "Kick in the Head", was written by Robert Hunter. Donna Jean Godchaux and Buffy Sainte-Marie contribute background vocals on several tracks.

== Track listing ==
1. "Panama Red" (Peter Rowan) – 2:47
2. "It's Alright With Me" (Dave Torbert) – 2:43
3. "Lonesome L.A. Cowboy" (Rowan) – 4:05
4. "Important Exportin Man" (Tim Hovey, Torbert) – 2:26
5. "One Too Many Stories" (John Dawson) – 2:54
6. "Kick in the Head" (Robert Hunter) – 2:30
7. "You Should Have Seen Me Runnin" (Dawson) – 3:01
8. "Teardrops in My Eyes" (Red Allen, Tommy Sutton) – 2:15
9. "L.A. Lady" (Troy Seals, Don Goodman, Will Jennings) – 2:13
10. "Thank the Day" (Torbert) – 2:23
11. "Cement, Clay and Glass" (Spencer Dryden, David Nelson) – 2:34

== Personnel ==
=== New Riders of the Purple Sage ===
- John Dawson – guitar, vocals, lead vocals on "Lonesome L.A. Cowboy", "One Too Many Stories", "You Should Have Seen Me Runnin", and "Cement, Clay and Glass"
- David Nelson – electric guitar, vocals, lead vocals on "Panama Red", and "Teardrops In My Eyes"
- Dave Torbert – bass, guitar, vocals, lead vocals on "It's Alright with me", "Important Exportin' Man", "Kick In the Head", "L.A. Lady", and "Thank the Day"
- Buddy Cage – pedal steel guitar
- Spencer Dryden – drums, percussion

=== Additional Musicians ===
- Donna Jean Godchaux – vocals on "Important Exportin Man" and "L.A. Lady"
- Buffy Sainte-Marie – vocals on "You Should Have Seen Me Runnin'" and "Cement, Clay and Glass"
- Norbert Putnam – bass on "Thank the Day"
- The Memphis Horns, arranged by Norbert Putnam and the Memphis Horns

=== Production ===
- Producer: Norbert Putnam
- Recording engineer: Tom Flye
- Associate engineers: John Stronach, Bobby Hughes
- Sound engineers: Tom Anderson, Phil Brown, Bob Edwards
- Remix engineer: Norbert Putnam
- Cover art: Lore and Chris
- Recorded at the Record Plant, Sausalito
- Mixed at Quadrafonic Studios, Nashville
