= New Riders of the Purple Sage =

American country rock band

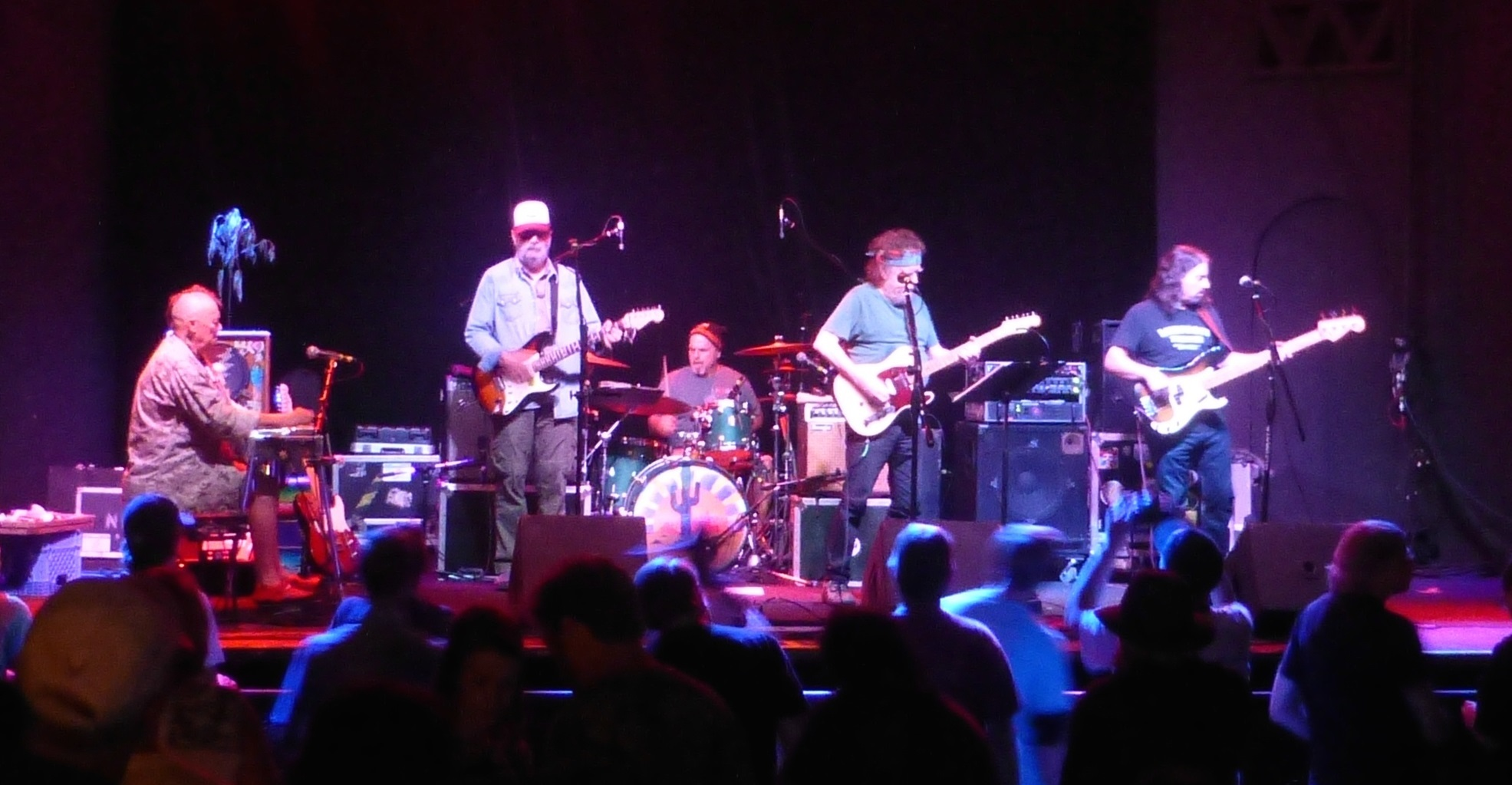
- New Riders of the Purple Sage in 2015. Left to right: Buddy Cage, Michael Falzarano, Johnny Markowski, David Nelson, Ronnie Penque.

Background information
- Origin: San Francisco, California, U.S.
- Genres: Country rock; progressive country
- Years active: 1969–1997, 2005–2017
- Labels: Columbia; MCA; A&M; Relix
- Members: David Nelson; Michael Falzarano; Ronnie Penque; Johnny Markowski
- Past members: See Lineups
- Website: thenewriders.com

New Riders of the Purple Sage was an American country rock band. The group emerged from the psychedelic rock scene in San Francisco in 1969 and its original lineup included several members of the Grateful Dead. The band is sometimes referred to as the New Riders or as NRPS.

== History ==
=== Origins: early 1960s–1969 ===
The roots of the New Riders can be traced back to the early 1960s Peninsula folk/beatnik scene centered on Stanford University's now-defunct Perry Lane housing complex in Menlo Park, California where future Grateful Dead guitarist Jerry Garcia often played gigs with like-minded guitarist David Nelson. The young John Dawson (also known as "Marmaduke") also played some concerts with Garcia, Nelson, and their compatriots while visiting relatives on summer vacation. Enamored of the sounds of Bakersfield-style country music, Dawson would turn his older friends on to the work of Merle Haggard and Buck Owens and provided a vital link between Timothy Leary's International Federation for Internal Freedom in Millbrook, New York (Dawson having boarded at the Millbrook School), and the Menlo Park bohemian coterie nurtured by Ken Kesey.

Inspired by American folk music, rock and roll, and blues, Garcia formed the Grateful Dead (initially known as The Warlocks) with blues singer Ron "Pigpen" McKernan, while Nelson joined the similarly inclined New Delhi River Band (which would eventually come to include bassist Dave Torbert) shortly thereafter. Although they lacked the managerial acumen and cultural cachet of the Grateful Dead and elected to remain in East Palo Alto, California, unlike the former group, which soon relocated to the Haight-Ashbury district of San Francisco, the New Delhi River Band were considered by late 1966 to be the house band of The Barn (one of the region's few viable concert venues outside of San Francisco) in Scotts Valley, California. The group continued to enjoy a cult following in Santa Clara and Santa Cruz Counties through the Summer of Love until their dissolution in early 1968.

After a period of inactivity Nelson contributed to the Grateful Dead's Aoxomoxoa (1969) sessions and served as the caretaker of Big Brother and the Holding Company's rehearsal space while guitarist Peter Albin and drummer David Getz undertook a European tour with Country Joe & the Fish following the schismatic departure of Janis Joplin and Sam Andrew from the former band in December 1968. During this period Nelson and Garcia played intermittently in an early iteration of High Country, a traditional bluegrass ensemble formed by the remnants of the Peninsula folk scene. Nelson was set to serve as lead guitarist in the reconstituted lineup of Big Brother that coalesced later in 1969 and thus may have contributed to some of the recordings on Be a Brother (1970) during this transitional period.

Dawson—who dropped out of Occidental College in December 1965 and remained in Los Angeles for several years thereafter, "hanging out with musicians and weirdos"—had returned to Los Altos Hills by early 1969, allowing him to contribute to the Aoxomoxoa sessions and briefly enroll at Foothill College. After a mescaline experience at Pinnacles National Park with Torbert and Matthew Kelly, he began to compose songs on a regular basis. Some (such as "Glendale Train" and "I Don't Know You") were traditional country pastiches; a number of others ("Last Lonely Eagle", "Garden of Eden", and "Dirty Business") found him working in a "psychedelic country" fusion milieu redolent of Gram Parsons' nascent Flying Burrito Brothers. "Henry", a traditional shuffle with contemporary lyrics about marijuana smuggling, also dates from this period.

Dawson's vision was prescient, as 1969 marked the emergence of country rock via Bob Dylan, The Band, The Flying Burrito Brothers, Poco, the Dillard & Clark Band, and the Clarence White-era Byrds. Around this time, Garcia was similarly inspired to take up the pedal steel guitar, and an informal line-up including Dawson, Garcia, and Peninsula folk veteran Peter Grant (on banjo) began playing coffeehouse and hofbrau concerts together when the Grateful Dead were not touring. Their repertoire included country standards, traditional bluegrass, Dawson originals, and a few Dylan covers ("Lay Lady Lay", "You Ain't Goin' Nowhere", "Mighty Quinn"). By the summer of 1969 it was decided that a full band would be formed and David Nelson was recruited to play lead guitar.

In addition to Nelson, Dawson (on acoustic guitar), and Garcia (continuing to play pedal steel), the original line-up of the band that came to be known as the New Riders of the Purple Sage (a nod to the Foy Willing-led Western swing combo from the 1940s, Riders of the Purple Sage, which borrowed its name from the Zane Grey novel) consisted of Alembic Studio engineer Bob Matthews on electric bass and Mickey Hart of the Grateful Dead on drums; bassist Phil Lesh also played sporadically with the ensemble in lieu of Matthews through the end of the year, as documented by the late 1969 demos later included on the Before Time Began archival release. Lyricist Robert Hunter briefly rehearsed with the band on bass in early 1970 before the permanent hiring of Torbert in April of that year. The most commercially successful configuration of the New Riders would come to encompass Dawson, Nelson, Torbert, Spencer Dryden, and Buddy Cage.

=== Vintage NRPS: 1969–1982 ===
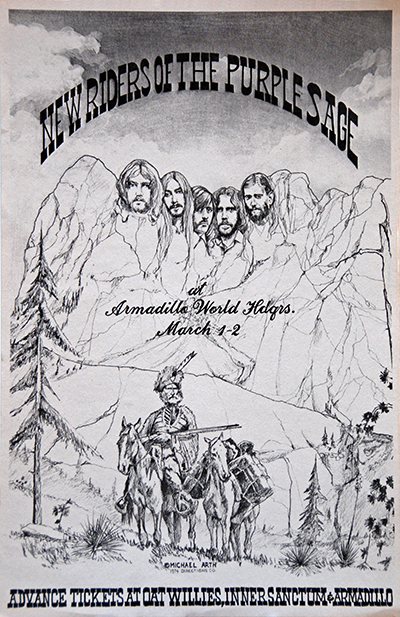
"New Riders of the Purple Sage" Armadillo World Headquarters poster by Michael E. Arth 1974

After a few warmup gigs throughout the Bay Area in 1969, Dawson, Nelson, and Torbert began to tour in May 1970 as part of a tripartite bill advertised as "An Evening with the Grateful Dead". An acoustic Grateful Dead set that often included contributions from Dawson and Nelson would then segue into New Riders and electric Dead sets, obviating the need to hire external opening acts.

By the time the New Riders recorded their first album, there were several personnel changes. Hart temporarily left the Grateful Dead in February 1971. Although Hart contributed to two tracks on the album, former Jefferson Airplane drummer Spencer Dryden replaced him in the New Riders prior to his departure from the parent group. Dryden would remain with the group for ten years, ultimately serving as the band's manager.

Their first album, eponymously titled was released on Columbia Records (under a contract informed by Clive Davis's long-term aspiration to sign the Grateful Dead) in late 1971. It proved to be a moderate success comparable to the Dead's releases of the era, peaking at No. 39 on the Billboard 200 chart. Entirely composed by Dawson (in comparison to the more egalitarian songwriting of later releases), the record was driven by Garcia's pedal-steel playing.

With the New Riders desiring to become more of a self-sufficient group and Garcia needing to focus on his other responsibilities, the musician parted ways with the group in November 1971. Seasoned pedal steel player Buddy Cage was recruited from Ian and Sylvia's Great Speckled Bird to replace Garcia. The band's second album, Powerglide (1972), was the first to feature this line-up. The Powerglide album art included a notable caricature of the band members drawn by Lore Shoberg.

1973's The Adventures of Panama Red included a Nelson-sung cover of Peter Rowan's "Panama Red" that steadily gained traction as an enduring FM radio staple. The album peaked at No. 55 in Billboard and, albeit as a sleeper hit, marked the band's commercial zenith; in 1979, it was certified gold by RIAA.

In the mid-1970s, Radio Caroline adopted the song "On My Way Back Home" from the Gypsy Cowboy album as the station's theme tune. The song was well-suited to the station's album-oriented format of the time, and included the lyric "Flying to the sun, sweet Caroline".

The New Riders of the Purple Sage continued touring and releasing albums throughout the late 1970s and early 1980s to an increasingly fallow reception; none of the albums that followed New Riders (1976) charted on the Billboard 200 in antipodal contrast to the widespread mainstream success of the outlaw country movement (exemplified by Willie Nelson and Waylon Jennings) and such second-wave country rock groups as The Eagles, Pure Prairie League, and Firefall. The band continued to open several Grateful Dead and Jerry Garcia Band shows in 1977 and 1978, including the final concert preceding the closure of Winterland Ballroom on December 31, 1978.

In 1974, Torbert left NRPS; he and Matthew Kelly co-founded the band Kingfish (best known for Bob Weir's membership during the Grateful Dead's late-1974 to mid-1976 touring hiatus) the year before. Initially he was replaced by Skip Battin (formerly of Skip & Flip and the early 1970s lineup of The Byrds), who briefly emerged as the dominant creative force in the band due to his prolific songwriting collaboration with controversial Hollywood impresario Kim Fowley. Stephen A. Love of Rick Nelson's Stone Canyon Band and the Roger McGuinn Band replaced Battin after he left the group to co-found a reconstituted lineup of The Flying Burrito Brothers in 1976. Shortly thereafter, Spencer Dryden relinquished his performance duties to manage the group in 1977. His musical replacement was Patrick Shanahan. Allen Kemp joined on bass in 1978 before emerging as a co-frontman on guitar and vocals, contributing prominently to the songwriting for the band's last major label release, 1981's Feelin' All Right.

In 1982, Nelson and Cage left the band, leaving Dawson as the sole remaining member from the classic lineup.

=== New New Riders: 1982–1997 ===
From the early 1980s to the late 1990s Dawson continued as leader of the New Riders of the Purple Sage. He was joined by bluegrass-oriented multi-instrumentalist Rusty Gauthier, who sang and played acoustic guitar, slide guitar, mandolin, banjo, and fiddle. During this fifteen-year period, an evolving lineup of musicians played with Dawson and Gauthier in the New Riders. These included among others, guitarists Allen Kemp, Gary Vogensen, and Evan Morgan; bass players Fred Campbell, Bill Laymon, and Michael White; and drummers Val Fuentes, and Greg Lagardo.

Some projects had the current line-up performing new material and others reworked older material. On some albums, such as Midnight Moonlight, the band's sound was less influenced by electric country rock and more by acoustic bluegrass music.

=== Retirement: 1997–2005 ===
In 1997, the New Riders of the Purple Sage split up. Dawson retired from music and moved to Mexico to become an English teacher. By this time, Nelson had started his own David Nelson Band. There was a reunion performance in 2001. In 2002, the New Riders accepted a Lifetime Achievement Award from High Times magazine. On hand were a frail Dawson (suffering from emphysema), Nelson, Cage, Dryden and Torbert's widow Patti. The band performed "Panama Red" and "Lonesome LA Cowboy" with Peter Rowan as part of the celebration. In the spring of 2004, Cage sat in at several gigs with the David Nelson Band.

=== NRPS revival: 2005–2017 ===
Shortly after the death of Spencer Dryden, a reconstituted line-up of the New Riders began touring in late 2005. It features David Nelson and Buddy Cage, alongside guitarist Michael Falzarano, bassist Ronnie Penque, and drummer Johnny Markowski. They have released a live album, Wanted: Live at Turkey Trot, and two studio albums, Where I Come From and 17 Pine Avenue.

Allen Kemp died on June 25, 2009. John "Marmaduke" Dawson died in Mexico on July 21, 2009, at the age of 64.

Pedal steel guitarist Buddy Cage died on February 5, 2020, at age 73. Prior to Cage's passing, the band had not performed for over two years and it has not been active since.

== Discography ==
=== Studio and live albums ===
Release date	Title	US Chart	Label	Notes
1971	New Riders of the Purple Sage	39	Columbia	
1972	Powerglide	33	Columbia	
1972	Gypsy Cowboy	85	Columbia	
1973	The Adventures of Panama Red	55	Columbia	US: Gold
1974	Home, Home on the Road	68	Columbia	
1974	Brujo	68	Columbia	
1975	Oh, What a Mighty Time	144	Columbia	
1976	New Riders	145	MCA	
1977	Who Are Those Guys?		MCA	
1977	Marin County Line		MCA	
1981	Feelin' All Right		A&M	
1986	Before Time Began		Relix	
1986	Vintage NRPS		Relix	
1989	Keep On Keepin' On		Mu	
1992	Midnight Moonlight		Relix	
1993	Live on Stage		Relix	
1994	Live in Japan		Relix	
1995	Live		Avenue	
2003	Worcester, MA, 4/4/73		Kufala	
2003	Boston Music Hall, 12/5/72		Kufala	
2004	Veneta, Oregon, 8/27/72		Kufala	Re-issued in 2020 as Field Trip
2005	Armadillo World Headquarters, Austin, TX, 6/13/75		Kufala	
2007	S.U.N.Y., Stonybrook, NY, 3/17/73		Kufala	
2007	Wanted: Live at Turkey Trot		Fa-Ka-Wee	
2009	Winterland, San Francisco, CA, 12/31/77		Kufala	
2009	Where I Come From		Woodstock	
2012	17 Pine Avenue		Woodstock	
2013	Glendale Train		Smokin'	
2019	Thanksgiving in New York City		Omnivore	
2020	Bear's Sonic Journals: Dawn of the New Riders of the Purple Sage		Owsley Stanley Foundation	
2022	Lyceum '72		Omnivore	
2024	Hempsteader		Omnivore	

=== Compilation albums ===
Release date	Title	Label
1976	The Best of New Riders of the Purple Sage	Columbia
1987	Take a Red	MCA
1991	L.A. Lady	Sony
1992	The Relix Bay Rock Shop, No. 1	Relix
1994	Wasted Tasters	Raven
1995	Relix's Best of the Early New Riders of the Purple Sage	Relix
1997	Relix's Best of the New New Riders of the Purple Sage	Relix
2000	Ridin' with Panama Red	Sony
2006	Cactus Juice	Arcadia
2009	Very Best of the Relix Years	Retro World
2011	Setlist: The Very Best of New Riders of the Purple Sage Live	Legacy
2011	Instant Armadillo Blues	Raven
2017	Original Album Classics	Sony

=== Singles ===
Seven-inch singles released by the New Riders of the Purple Sage are:

Release date	Title	Album	Label
1971	"Louisiana Lady" / "Last Lonely Eagle"	New Riders of the Purple Sage	Columbia
1971	"I Don't Know You" / "Garden of Eden"	New Riders of the Purple Sage	Columbia
1972	"I Don't Need No Doctor" / "Runnin' Back to You"	Powerglide	Columbia
1972	"Dim Lights, Thick Smoke (And Loud, Loud Music)" / "Rainbow"	Powerglide	Columbia
1973	"Groupie" / "She's No Angel"	Gypsy Cowboy	Columbia
1973	"Panama Red" / "Cement, Clay and Glass"	The Adventures of Panama Red	Columbia
1974	"You Angel You" / "Parson Brown"	Brujo	Columbia
1976	"Fifteen Days Under the Hood" / "Don't Put Her Down"	New Riders	MCA
1976	"Dead Flowers" / "She's Looking Better Every Beer"	New Riders	MCA
1977	"Love Has Strange Ways" / "Red Hot Women and Ice Cold Beer"	Who Are Those Guys?	MCA
1977	"Just Another Night in Reno" / "Home Grown"	Who Are Those Guys?	MCA
1980	"Night for Making Love" / "Fly Right"	Feelin' All Right	A&M
1980	"No Other Love" / "Full Moon at Midnight"	Feelin' All Right	A&M

== Lineups ==
The membership of the New Riders of the Purple Sage has changed many times. The following table shows a somewhat simplified version of the history of the band's lineups.

1969–1970	John Dawson – guitar, vocals; David Nelson – guitar, vocals; Jerry Garcia – pedal steel guitar; Bob Matthews, Robert Hunter, or Phil Lesh – bass guitar; Mickey Hart – drums
1970	John Dawson – guitar, vocals; David Nelson – guitar, vocals; Jerry Garcia – pedal steel guitar; Dave Torbert – bass guitar; Mickey Hart – drums
1971	John Dawson – guitar, vocals; David Nelson – guitar, vocals; Jerry Garcia – pedal steel guitar; Dave Torbert – bass guitar; Spencer Dryden – drums
1971–1974	John Dawson – guitar, vocals; David Nelson – guitar, vocals; Buddy Cage – pedal steel guitar; Dave Torbert – bass guitar, vocals; Spencer Dryden – drums
1974–1976	John Dawson – guitar, vocals; David Nelson – guitar, vocals; Buddy Cage – pedal steel guitar; Skip Battin – bass guitar; Spencer Dryden – drums
1976–1977	John Dawson – guitar, vocals; David Nelson – guitar, vocals; Buddy Cage – pedal steel guitar; Stephen A. Love – bass guitar; Spencer Dryden – drums
1977–1978	John Dawson – guitar, vocals; David Nelson – guitar, vocals; Buddy Cage – pedal steel guitar; Stephen A. Love – bass guitar; Patrick Shanahan – drums
1978	John Dawson – guitar, vocals; David Nelson – guitar, vocals; Buddy Cage or Pete Grant – pedal steel guitar; Allen Kemp – guitar, vocals; Patrick Shanahan – drums
1978–1980	John Dawson – guitar, vocals; David Nelson – guitar, vocals; Bobby Black – pedal steel guitar; Allen Kemp – guitar, vocals; Patrick Shanahan – drums
1980	John Dawson – guitar, vocals; David Nelson – guitar, vocals; Bobby Black – pedal steel guitar; Allen Kemp – guitar, vocals; Michael White – bass guitar; Patrick Shanahan – drums
1980	John Dawson – guitar, vocals; David Nelson – guitar, vocals; Buddy Cage – pedal steel guitar; Allen Kemp – guitar, vocals; Michael White – bass guitar; Patrick Shanahan – drums
1980–1981	John Dawson – guitar, vocals; David Nelson – guitar, vocals; Buddy Cage – pedal steel guitar; Allen Kemp – guitar, vocals; Patrick Shanahan – drums
1981–1982	John Dawson – guitar, vocals; David Nelson – guitar, vocals; Buddy Cage – pedal steel guitar; Allen Kemp – guitar, vocals; Billy Wolf – bass guitar; Patrick Shanahan – drums
1982–1984	John Dawson – guitar, vocals; Rusty Gauthier – guitar and other instruments, vocals; Allen Kemp – guitar; Billy Wolf – bass guitar; Val Fuentes – drums
1984–1985	John Dawson – guitar, vocals; Rusty Gauthier – guitar and other instruments, vocals; Allen Kemp – guitar, vocals; Michael White – bass guitar; Greg Lagardo – drums
1985–1987	John Dawson – guitar, vocals; Rusty Gauthier – guitar and other instruments, vocals; Gary Vogensen – guitar, vocals; Billy Wolf – bass guitar; Val Fuentes – drums
1987–1990	John Dawson – guitar, vocals; Rusty Gauthier – guitar and other instruments, vocals; Gary Vogensen – guitar, vocals; Michael White – bass guitar; Val Fuentes – drums
1990–1993	John Dawson – guitar, vocals; Rusty Gauthier – guitar and other instruments, vocals; Gary Vogensen – guitar, vocals; Fred Campbell – bass guitar
1993–1994	John Dawson – guitar, vocals; Rusty Gauthier – guitar and other instruments, vocals; Evan Morgan – guitar, vocals; Bill Laymon – bass guitar
1997	John Dawson – guitar, vocals; Rusty Gauthier – guitar and other instruments, vocals; Gary Vogensen – guitar, vocals; Fred Campbell – bass guitar
2005–2017	David Nelson – guitar, vocals; Buddy Cage – pedal steel guitar; Michael Falzarano – guitar, vocals; Ronnie Penque – bass guitar, vocals; Johnny Markowski – drums
