= Dim Lights, Thick Smoke (and Loud, Loud Music) =

Single by Joe & Rose Lee Maphis
- Released: April 1953
- Recorded: 1953
- Genre: Country
- Length: 2:59
- Label: Okeh Records
- Songwriter(s): Joe Maphis; Rose Lee Maphis; Max Fidler

"Dim Lights, Thick Smoke (and Loud, Loud Music)" is a country song written by Joe Maphis, Rose Lee Maphis, and Max Fidler. It was originally recorded in December 1952 by the bluegrass duo Flatt & Scruggs, and later released by Joe & Rose Lee Maphis in 1953 as a single.

Joe Maphis said he started the song after moving from barn dance shows in Virginia and Chicago to playing in a honky-tonk in Bakersfield, California, in a band that included Buck Owens on back-up vocals. It is also said that Joe Maphis wrote the song one Saturday night (presumably in 1952) while driving home to Los Angeles from Bakersfield after seeing Buck Owens perform at the Blackboard Cafe.

== Covers ==
- Conway Twitty released a cover version on his 1968 album Here's Conway Twitty & His Lonely Blue Boys
- The Flying Burrito Brothers recorded a version in 1970 for an unreleased album. The track was eventually released on the 1976 Gram Parsons' compilation album Sleepless Nights
- A second, different version of the song was released by the Flying Burrito Brothers on their 1975 album Flying Again
- New Riders of the Purple Sage's 1972 album Powerglide
- Earl Scruggs and Tom T. Hall's 1982 album The Storyteller And The Banjo Man
- Vern Gosdin's 1985 album Time Stood Still
- Jack Ingram's 1997 album Livin' or Dyin'
- The Derailers 1995 album Live Tracks
- Marty Stuart's 1997 album Once Upon a Time
- Bill Kirchen's 2001 album Tied to the Wheel
- Ricky Skaggs 2001 album History of the Future
- Daryle Singletary's 2002 album That's Why I Sing This Way
- The Beat Farmers' 2003 album (recorded in 1983) Live at the Spring Valley Inn
- Dwight Yoakam's 2012 album 3 Pears
- John Prine and Amanda Shires for his 2016 album For Better, or Worse
- Manassas on their 2009 rarities album Pieces

The song has also been covered by Margie Collie, Glen Glenn, Tom T. Hall, Porter Wagoner, Tennessee Ernie Ford & Molly Bee, Weldon Rogers & Willie Rogers, Big Tom, Wade Hayes and David Adam Byrnes.
