= Truck Drivin' Man =

"Truck Driving Man"
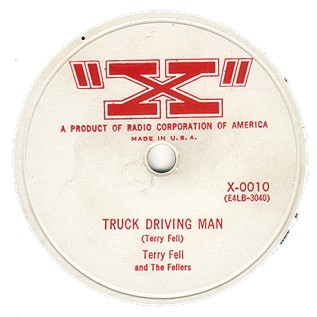

Single by Terry Fell
- B-side: "Don't Drop It"
- Released: 1954
- Genre: Country
- Length: 2:24
- Label: X
- Songwriter: Terry Fell

"Truck Drivin' Man" is a popular country song written by Terry Fell and originally recorded by Terry Fell and The Fellers in 1954. One of his band members, Buck Owens, sang harmony with him on the recording.

In 1965, Owens recorded the song himself, omitting the fourth verse - "When I get my call up to glory, They will take me away from this land, I'll head this truck up to Heaven, 'Cause I'm a truck drivin' man."

Others who have recorded the song include Red Steagall, Ricky Nelson, Boxcar Willie, Charley Pride, Bill Anderson, Conway Twitty, Jimmy Martin, Dave Dudley, Red Simpson, Jim & Jesse, Charlie Walker, The Flying Burrito Brothers, George Hamilton IV, Glen Campbell, New Riders of the Purple Sage, Willie Nelson, Commander Cody and His Lost Planet Airmen, Anthony Field, Plainsong, David Allan Coe, Leon Russell, Toby Keith, Aaron Tippin, Robert Walker, Weedeater, the J. Geils Band, Don Walser, and Canadian musicians Stompin' Tom Connors and Dick Nolan.

"Truck Drivin' Man" is also covered by Nordre Sving Blandede Mannskor og Orkester as "Trailersjåfør", with Norwegian lyric by Finn Sidselrud. In Finland, the song was covered in 1975 by Kari Tapio as "Rekkakuski", with Finnish lyrics by Erkki Liikanen.
