= Dead Flowers (Rolling Stones song) =

Song performed by The Rolling Stones

Song by The Rolling Stones

from the album Sticky Fingers
- Released: 23 April 1971
- Recorded: December 1969 – April 1970
- Studio: Olympic, London
- Genre: Country rock; country
- Length: 4:03
- Label: Rolling Stones Records
- Songwriter: Jagger–Richards
- Producer: Jimmy Miller

"Dead Flowers" is a song recorded by the Rolling Stones. Written by Mick Jagger and Keith Richards, it appears on their 1971 album Sticky Fingers as the fourth track of side two.

== Background and recording ==
"Dead Flowers" was written during the period when the Stones were influenced by country music, due in part to Richards's friendship with Gram Parsons. The song was recorded at Olympic Studios in London, with sessions documented between 15 December 1969 and 24 April 1970. The lyrics are notably dark, such as the line "I'll be in my basement room, with a needle and a spoon", a reference to injecting heroin.

Jagger delivers the vocal in an exaggerated country twang, a style with which he was reportedly not comfortable. He commented in 2003:

The 'Country' songs we recorded later, like "Dead Flowers" on Sticky Fingers or "Far Away Eyes" on Some Girls, are slightly different (than our earlier ones). The actual music is played completely straight, but it's me who's not going legit with the whole thing, because I think I'm a blues singer not a country singer – I think it's more suited to Keith's voice than mine.

Both Richards and Mick Taylor contribute the 'honky-tonk' style lead guitar lines throughout the album version: Richards plays a Telecaster and sings harmony, while Taylor adds pedal-steel-style licks and performs the guitar solo in place of a third verse. Richards's choppier fills act primarily as a response to Jagger's vocal lines during the verses, while Taylor's more fluid licks counteract with the vocals of the chorus. Ian Stewart's barroom-style piano adds to the song's honky-tonk feel.

An alternate version of the song was released on the 2015 deluxe reissue of Sticky Fingers. In place of the acoustic strumming and piano of the album version, it is driven by electric guitar and is closer to how the band played the song live at the time.

== Live performances ==
"Dead Flowers" was first performed live on the band's UK tour, which opened at Newcastle City Hall on 4 March 1971, ahead of the release of Sticky Fingers. It stayed in the setlist through the Exile on Main St. tour of 1972. In 1976 it was played once, at the Knebworth Fair on 21 August, a show held after the band's Tour of Europe '76. It was not played again until the Steel Wheels Tour in 1989, including at Toronto's Exhibition Stadium on 3 September 1989.

The band have also performed it with guest singers. Brad Paisley traded verses with Jagger in Philadelphia on 18 June 2013, during the 50 & Counting tour, and again at LP Field in Nashville on 17 June 2015, during the Zip Code Tour, for which he was the opening act. The 2013 Philadelphia performance was later included on the 2019 compilation Honk.

Several live recordings have been officially released:

- A performance in the refectory at the University of Leeds on 13 March 1971, originally recorded for the BBC, appears on Get Yer Leeds Lungs Out!, a bonus disc in the super deluxe edition of the 2015 Sticky Fingers reissue.
- A performance filmed at London's Marquee Club on 26 March 1971 was released in June 2015 as From the Vault: The Marquee Club Live in 1971.
- A performance from the 3 pm show in Fort Worth, Texas, on 24 June 1972 features in the concert film Ladies and Gentlemen: The Rolling Stones, issued on DVD and Blu-ray on 12 October 2010 and as a live album on 16 June 2017.
- A performance at Brixton Academy, London, on 19 July 1995 appears on Stripped (1995); the 2016 edition Totally Stripped adds a performance from the Paradiso, Amsterdam, on 26 May 1995.

== Personnel ==
Personnel adapted from Sticky Fingers liner notes

The Rolling Stones

- Mick Jagger – acoustic guitar, vocals
- Keith Richards – electric guitar, acoustic guitar, backing vocals
- Mick Taylor – electric guitar
- Bill Wyman – bass guitar
- Charlie Watts – drums

Additional performer

- Ian Stewart – piano

== Cover versions ==
The song has been widely covered; by 2024 SecondHandSongs listed 61 cover versions, making it the 19th most-covered Rolling Stones song. New Riders of the Purple Sage recorded it for their 1976 album New Riders. Steve Earle included a live version on his 1991 album Shut Up and Die Like an Aviator, recorded with The Dukes in October 1990.

Townes Van Zandt included a version of the song on his album of live covers Roadsongs. This version plays over the closing credits of the 1998 film The Big Lebowski. According to the film's music supervisor T Bone Burnett, former Stones manager Allen Klein, who controlled the song's rights, initially asked for $150,000 to license it; after watching a cut of the film and hearing the Dude say "I hate the fuckin' Eagles, man!", Klein granted the rights.

Willie Nelson performed the song with Keith Richards, Hank Williams III and Ryan Adams on his live album Willie Nelson & Friends – Stars & Guitars. Jerry Lee Lewis released a version on his 2010 album Mean Old Man, which featured Mick Jagger. Guns N' Roses have played the song in concert; at the O2 Arena in London on 31 May 2012, former guitarist Izzy Stradlin joined the band to perform it. Poison recorded the song for their 2007 covers album Poison'd!. Scott Weiland included it on A Compilation of Scott Weiland Cover Songs (2011).
