= Buddy Cage =

American pedal steel guitarist (1946–2020)

- Born: February 18, 1946; Toronto, Ontario, Canada
- Died: February 5, 2020 (aged 73)
- Genres: Country rock
- Instrument: Pedal steel guitar
- Years active: 1960s–2020
- Formerly of: New Riders of the Purple Sage, Great Speckled Bird, Stir Fried, The Brooklyn Cowboys

Buddy Cage (February 18, 1946 – February 5, 2020) was an American pedal steel guitarist, best known as a longtime member of the New Riders of the Purple Sage.

Popular both as a performer and session musician, he played with many bands and recording artists, including Anne Murray, Bob Dylan, Brewer & Shipley, David Bromberg, and the Zen Tricksters.

== Musical career ==
Buddy Cage learned to play pedal steel guitar at a young age. By the mid-1960s he was working as a professional musician, both onstage and as a session player for the Arc Records label. When the folk music duo of Ian and Sylvia decided to go electric in 1969, he joined their band, known as the Great Speckled Bird. Great Speckled Bird was part of the Festival Express concert tour in 1970. From 1969 to 1972, Cage also recorded four albums with Anne Murray, and one album with Brewer & Shipley.

It was on the Festival Express tour that the New Riders of the Purple Sage became acquainted with Cage. The New Riders were a psychedelic influenced country rock band that had been founded by Jerry Garcia of the Grateful Dead, along with John Dawson and David Nelson. The New Riders and the Dead would perform concerts together, with Garcia playing pedal steel for the New Riders, then playing electric guitar and singing with the Dead.

After the Festival Express Tour, Cage left Great Speckled Bird and joined the group Hog Heaven, who had for years backed singer Tommy James as the Shondells. (He co-wrote one song on the group's album for Roulette Records.) Near the end of 1971, Jerry Garcia left the New Riders, enabling them to headline their own concert tours. Cage was invited to join the band as Garcia's replacement.

Cage was the New Riders' pedal steel guitar player from 1971 to 1982, except for a period of about a year in the late 1970s. The New Riders were quite popular. They toured extensively, and released a number of albums. During this same period Cage continued working as a session musician, recording with various musical artists, including David Bromberg and Robert Hunter. In 1974, Bob Dylan asked him to play on recording sessions for the album Blood on the Tracks.

In the years after Cage's departure from the New Riders, he continued working with many different bands and musicians, including Solar Circus, Stir Fried, the Brooklyn Cowboys, the Zen Tricksters, Mike Gordon, Midnight Rain, and Bone Alley.

The New Riders of the Purple Sage, led by John Dawson, but without Buddy Cage or David Nelson, had continued touring and recording albums from 1982 until Dawson's retirement from the music business in 1997. In 2005, Cage and Nelson re-formed the New Riders of the Purple Sage. The impetus came from sessions Cage did with Stir Fried. They released three albums — Wanted: Live at Turkey Trot, Where I Come From, and 17 Pine Avenue. Cage also worked as a session musician with other artists, including collaborations with Boris Garcia, George Hamilton IV, and Richard Buckner.

In 2005, Cage participated in the three-date "Steelin' and Slidin' Festival" in the Netherlands with Derek Trucks, Sonny Landreth, Dan Tyack, Johan Jansen, and Rene van Barneveld.

Cage died from multiple myeloma at the age of 73 on February 5, 2020.

== Discography ==
- Hard Times – Mickey McGivern & the Mustangs (1967)
- This Way Is My Way — Anne Murray (1969)
- Honey, Wheat and Laughter — Anne Murray (1970)
- Great Speckled Bird — Great Speckled Bird (1970)
- Straight, Clean and Simple — Anne Murray (1971)
- Talk It Over in the Morning — Anne Murray (1971)
- Rural Space — Brewer & Shipley (1972)
- Powerglide — New Riders of the Purple Sage (1972)
- Gypsy Cowboy — New Riders of the Purple Sage (1972)
- The Adventures of Panama Red — New Riders of the Purple Sage (1973)
- Home, Home on the Road — New Riders of the Purple Sage (1974)
- Brujo — New Riders of the Purple Sage (1974)
- Tales of the Great Rum Runners — Robert Hunter (1974)
- Blood on the Tracks — Bob Dylan (1975)
- Midnight on the Water — David Bromberg (1975)
- Oh, What a Mighty Time — New Riders of the Purple Sage (1975)
- New Riders — New Riders of the Purple Sage (1976)
- Who Are Those Guys? — New Riders of the Purple Sage (1977)
- Marin County Line — New Riders of the Purple Sage (1978)
- Too Close for Comfort — Terry & the Pirates (1979)
- Feelin' All Right — New Riders of the Purple Sage (1981)
- Heart on a Sleeve — Tom Russell (1984)
- Empty Bottles — The Chili Brothers (1988)
- Step Right Up — Solar Circus (1992)
- Twilight Dance — Solar Circus (1992)
- A Historical Retrospective — Solar Circus (1993)
- Live on Stage — New Riders of the Purple Sage (1993)
- Prova De Amor — Jorge Ferreira (1995)
- Rock 'n' Roll Heaven — Frank Novato (1995)
- Slip into Somewhere – Slipknot (1997)
- Predicting the Weather – Midnight Rain (1998)
- Stir Fried — Stir Fried (1999)
- Electrafried — Stir Fried (1999)
- Terrapin — Joe Gallant and Illuminati (1999)
- Doin' Time on Planet Earth — Brooklyn Cowboys (1999)
- Last of the Blue Diamond Miners — Stir Fried (2000)
- Dodging Bullets — Brooklyn Cowboys (2002)
- Jamazon — Reverend Tor (2002)
- The Other Man in Black: The Ballad of Dale Earnhardt — Brooklyn Cowboys (2002)
- Try Again — Mike Ireland & Holler (2002)
- Worcester, MA, 4/4/73 — New Riders of the Purple Sage (2003)
- Boston Music Hall, 12/5/72 — New Riders of the Purple Sage (2003)
- Shaking Off the Weirdness — Zen Tricksters (2003)
- Redemption — The Last Hombres (2003)
- Inside In — Mike Gordon (2003)
- Veneta, Oregon, 8/27/72 — New Riders of the Purple Sage (2004)
- Armadillo World Headquarters, Austin, TX, 6/13/75 — New Riders of the Purple Sage (2005)
- Brand New Stranger — JJ Baron (2006)
- Everything Is One — Pete Francis (2006)
- Grace's Bell — Ben Rudnick (2007)
- Gift: A Tribute to Ian Tyson — various artists (2007)
- Iris Nova — Mudville (2007)
- Patience on Friday — Ryan Montbleau (2007)
- S.U.N.Y., Stonybrook, NY, 3/17/73 — New Riders of the Purple Sage (2007)
- Wanted: Live at Turkey Trot — New Riders of the Purple Sage (2007)
- Once More Into the Bliss — Boris Garcia (2008)
- We Are All One — Michael Falzarano (2008)
- Songs for the Soldier — Lance Larson (2008)
- Winterland, San Francisco, CA, 12/31/77 — New Riders of the Purple Sage (2009)
- Where I Come From — New Riders of the Purple Sage (2009)
- Stroller — The Crybabies (2010)
- My North Country Home — George Hamilton IV (2011)
- Our Blood — Richard Buckner (2011)
- 17 Pine Avenue — New Riders of the Purple Sage (2012)
- Family Business – Ronnie Penque (2019)
- Thanksgiving in New York City – New Riders of the Purple Sage (2019)
- Lyceum '72 – New Riders of the Purple Sage (2022)
- Hempsteader – New Riders of the Purple Sage (2024)
