= Rusty Wier =

American singer-songwriter

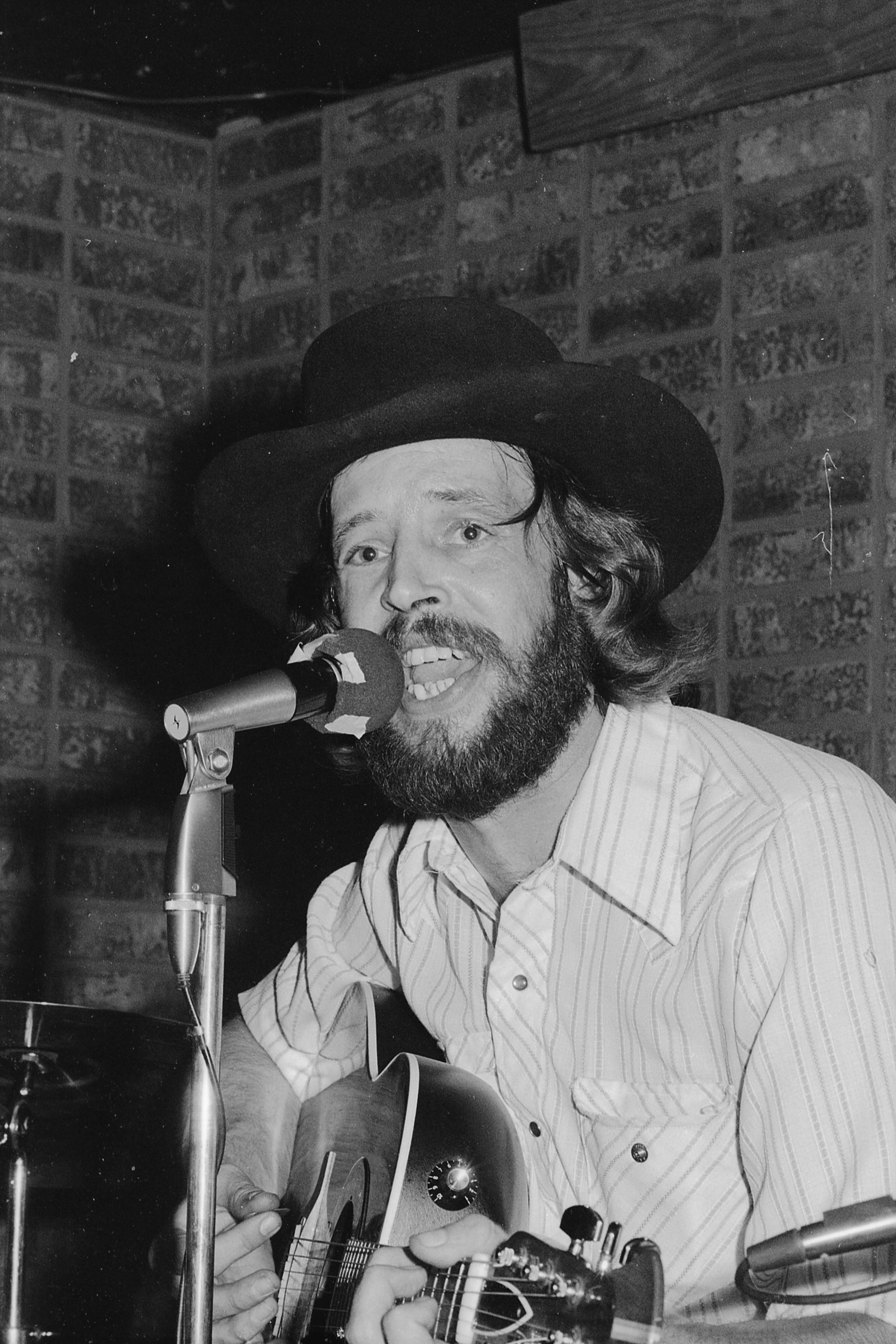
- Wier in early 1975.

Background information
- Born: Russell Allen Wier; May 3, 1944; Corpus Christi, Texas, U.S.
- Died: October 9, 2009 (aged 65) Driftwood, Texas, U.S.

Russell Allen "Rusty" Wier (May 3, 1944 – October 9, 2009) was an American singer-songwriter from Austin, Texas. Wier's career dates back to the 1960s and covers multiple music genres. Wier was the drummer in the Austin garage rock band The Wig, whose 1967 single "Crackin' Up" (a Wier composition) was included on volume 1 of the Pebbles series of compilation albums. Wier had a major local Texas hit in 1968 with "Watchout" with Gary P. Nunn and The Lavender Hill Express on Sonobeat Records. This was one of the first stereophonic 45s.

In the 1970s, Wier switched to country-rock and became a fixture on the burgeoning Austin music scene, and had a cult success with the song "I Heard You Been Layin' My Old Lady". His 1975 release "Don't It Make You Wanna Dance" became a regional hit and was later covered by a variety of artists, including Chris LeDoux, Jerry Jeff Walker, and Barbara Mandrell.

Wier was inducted into the Austin Music Awards Hall of Fame in 2002.

== Death ==
In November 2007, Wier was diagnosed with cancer. He died on October 9, 2009, aged 65. He is survived by four children.
