= Skip Battin =

American singer-songwriter and bassist (1934–2003)

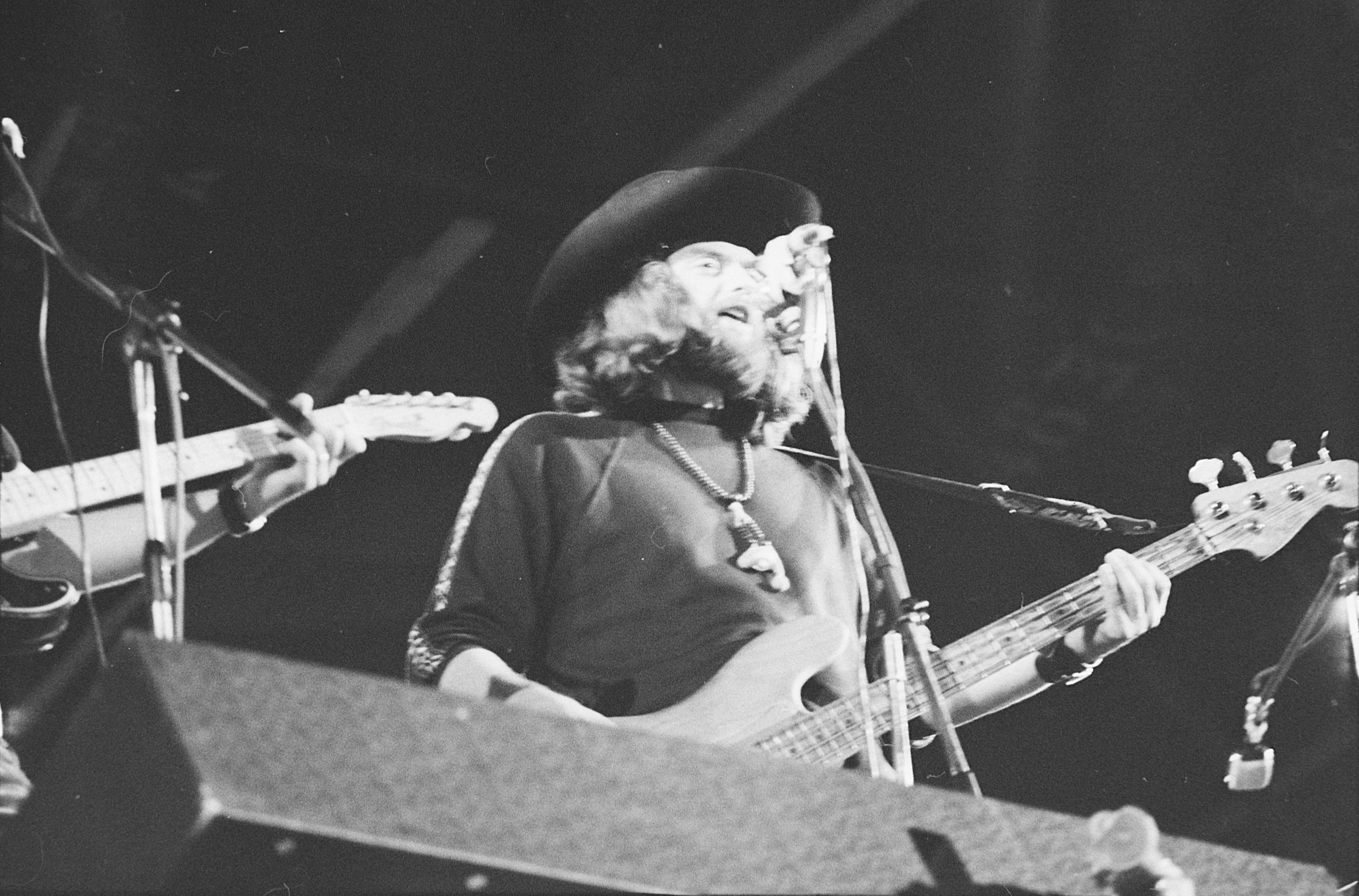
- Battin (Kralingen, 1970)

Background information
- Born: Clyde Battin; February 18, 1934; Gallipolis, Ohio, US
- Died: July 6, 2003 (aged 69)
- Genres: Rock; country rock; folk rock
- Occupations: Musician; songwriter
- Instruments: Vocals, bass guitar
- Years active: 1956–1991
- Labels: Columbia; Sierra
- Formerly of: The Byrds; New Riders of the Purple Sage; The Flying Burrito Brothers; Skip & Flip

Clyde "Skip" Battin (February 18, 1934 – July 6, 2003) was an American singer-songwriter, bassist, performer, and recording artist. He was a member of the Byrds, the New Riders of the Purple Sage, and the Flying Burrito Brothers.

== Εarly life ==
Clyde Raybould Battin was born in Gallipolis, Ohio, USA, attending local schools. He discovered the electric bass when he was 17 years old.

Two years later, he moved to Tucson to attend physical education classes at the University of Arizona. With fellow student Gary S. Paxton, he formed a college band, the Pledges. As Gary and Clyde, they recorded the single "Why Not Confess" (with "Johnny Risk" on the flipside) for Rev Records, a local label. In 1959, they went into the Desert Palm Studios in Phoenix, Arizona, the home of guitarist Duane Eddy, and recorded some Paxton compositions.

Entrepreneur Bob Shad issued the demo of the duo's song "It Was I" on his Brent label, and renamed the act as "Skip & Flip". Their song eventually made No 11 in the American charts. The follow-up, "Fancy Nancy", was a minor hit, but they charted again in 1960 with a cover of the Marvin and Johnny ballad "Cherry Pie". The novelty number "Hully Gully Cha Cha Cha", written by Paxton and Battin, garnered airplay but did not make the charts. A short time later, the pair disbanded.

In 1961, Battin moved to California, where he got small acting parts in films and on television. In 1966, after a few years out of the music industry, he formed the short-lived folk-rock group Evergreen Blueshoes, whose one album appeared on the Amos label. After the album failed to sell, Battin concentrated instead on session work for many musicians, such as Gene Vincent, Warren Zevon, and others.

== Fame ==
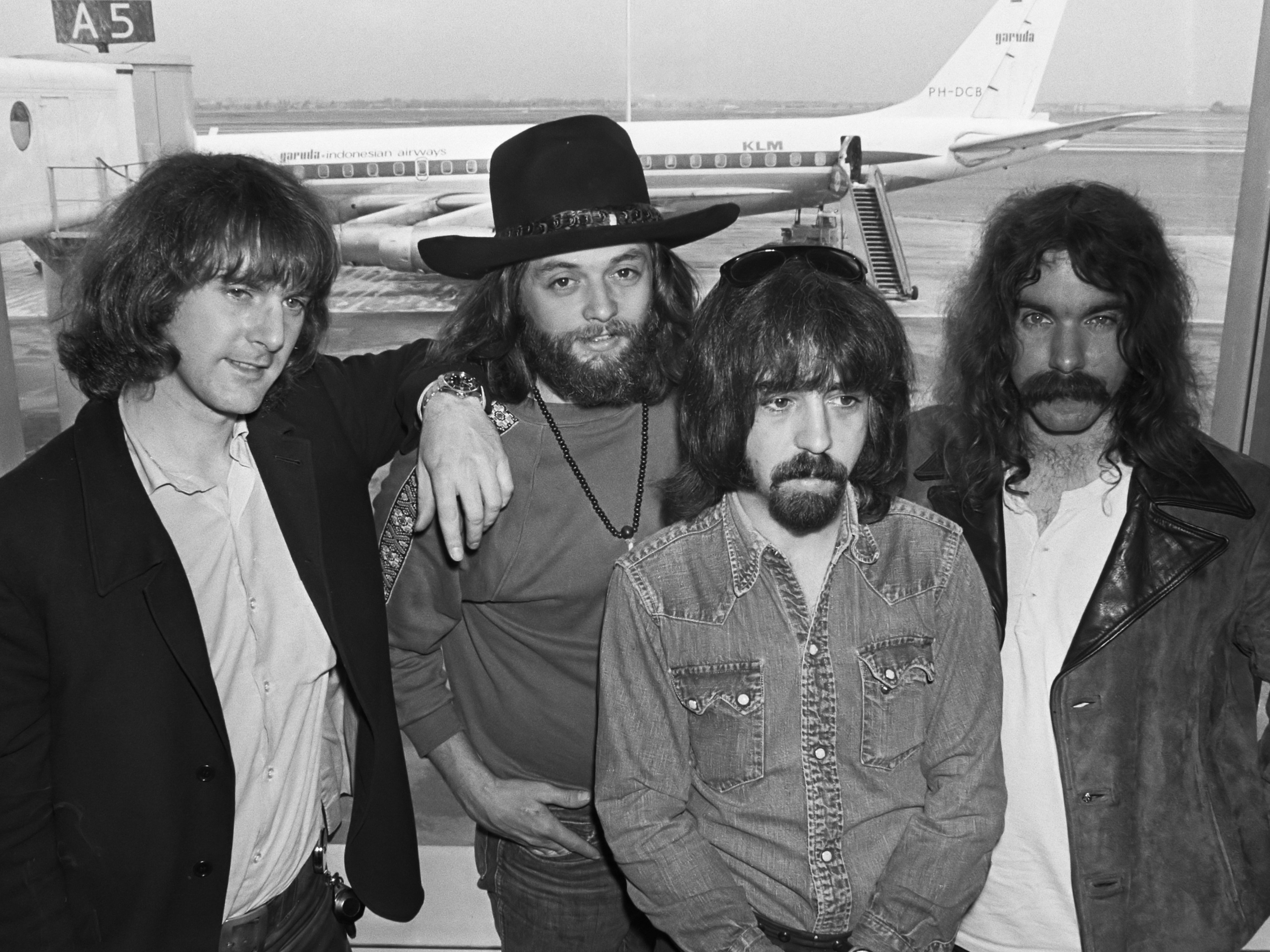
The Byrds in 1970. (L–R) Roger McGuinn, Skip Battin, Clarence White, Gene Parsons

Battin is probably best known as bass guitarist and songwriter with the Byrds from 1970 to 1973. He was—by eight years—the oldest member of the Byrds. He recorded three albums with them and toured extensively. Many of his songwriting contributions were co-written with Kim Fowley. After the breakup of the Columbia Byrds, Battin recorded a solo album, Skip.

In February 1973, he began work on his Topanga Skyline solo album. After it was completed, it was shelved for unclear reasons. Battin was invited to join the country-rock group New Riders of the Purple Sage, with whom he recorded three albums from 1974 to 1976.

He left the group to join his ex-Byrd cohort Gene Parsons in a new line up of the Flying Burrito Brothers. Meanwhile, he was replaced in the New Riders within the year by Stephen A. Love.

In 1984, Battin got into a fight with Roger McGuinn after a live performance in London, UK, when McGuinn failed to pay wages to a line-up called the Peace Seekers.

From 1989 to 1991, Battin toured occasionally with Michael Clarke's Byrds, named "The Byrds featuring Michael Clarke." After Clarke's death, the band continued as The Byrds Celebration, with Battin the sole ex-Byrds member. He stopped touring and recording after his Alzheimer's disease had reached an advanced state.

== Personal life ==
Battin married and had a son, Brent. In the 1980s he remarried, had a son, John-Clyde and daughter, Susanna, while pursuing his dream of farming with his wife Patricia in the agricultural Willamette Valley of Oregon. Battin died on July 6, 2003, of complications from Alzheimer's disease.

In 2012, following negotiations undertaken by his son Brent with the record company, the 1973 solo album Topanga Skyline was released on Sierra Records in celebration of the 40th anniversary of Skip Battin's first appearance with the Byrds.

== Discography ==
=== Solo albums ===
- 1972: Skip (Signpost)
- 1981: Navigator (Appaloosa)
- 1984: Don't Go Crazy (Appaloosa)
- 2012: Topanga Skyline (Sierra) (recorded July 17–30, 1973 in Hollywood CA)
- 2017: Skip Battin's Italian Dream (Appaloosa)

=== Collaborations ===
- 1985: Live in Italy (Moondance) with Sneaky Pete Kleinow and Ricky Mantoan
- 1998: Family Tree (Folkest Dischi) with John York, Ricky Mantoan, and Beppe D'Angelo

=== With Skip & Flip ===
==== Singles ====
- 1959: "It Was I" / "Lunch Hour" US #11
- 1959: "Fancy Nancy" / "It Could Be" US #71
- 1960: "Cherry Pie" / "(I'll Quit) Cryin' Over You" US #11
- 1960: "Hully Gully Cha Cha Cha" / "Teenage Honeymoon" US #109
- 1960: "Willow Tree" / "Green Door"
- 1961: "Betty Jean" / "Doubt"
- 1962: "One More Drink for Julie" / "Over the Mountain"

=== As The Skip Battin Combo ===
==== Singles ====
- 1962: "Can't Stop Twistin" / "Quarter To Three In Moscow" (Indigo Records)

=== With the Evergreen Blueshoes ===
- 1969: The Ballad of Evergreen Blueshoes (Amos)

=== With The Byrds ===
- 1970: (Untitled) (Columbia)
- 1971: Byrdmaniax (Columbia)
- 1971: Farther Along (Columbia)
- 2008: Live at Royal Albert Hall 1971 (Sundazed)

=== With The Flying Burrito Brothers ===
- 1976: Airborne (Columbia)
- 1979: Live from Tokyo (Regency)
- 1981: Hearts on the Line (Curb) as The Burrito Brothers
- 1983: Hollywood Nights 1979–82 (Sundown)
- 1985: Cabin Fever (Relix)
- 1986: Live from Europe (Relix)
- 1991: Close Encounters on the West Coast (Relix)

=== With New Riders of the Purple Sage ===
- 1974: Brujo (Columbia)
- 1975: Oh, What a Mighty Time (Columbia)
- 1976: New Riders (MCA)
- 1993: Live on Stage (Relix)
- 2005: Armadillo World Headquarters, Austin, TX, 6/13/75 (Kufala)

=== Also appears on ===
- 1969: Warren Zevon – Wanted Dead or Alive (Imperial)
- 1973: Kim Fowley – International Heroes (Capitol)
- 1975: Earl Scruggs Revue – Anniversary Special Volume One (Columbia)
- 1978: Kim Fowley – Visions of the Future (Capitol)
- 1979: Sneaky Pete Kleinow – Sneaky Pete (Shiloh)
