= Dave Torbert =

American musician (1948–1982)

- Born: David Edwin Torbert; June 7, 1948
- Died: December 7, 1982 (aged 34)
- Genre: Rock
- Instruments: Bass guitar, vocals
- Years active: 1968–1982
- Formerly of: New Riders of the Purple Sage; Kingfish

David Edwin Torbert (June 7, 1948 – December 7, 1982) was a Bay Area musician, best known for his associations with the Grateful Dead and the New Riders of the Purple Sage. He played bass for the latter group, replacing Phil Lesh during the sessions for their first album. He also played on "Box of Rain", a song from American Beauty, and on "Greatest Story Ever Told" from Bob Weir's solo album Ace. Additionally, he was a founding member, with Matthew Kelly, of the band Kingfish. Among the songs that Torbert wrote and sang lead with the New Riders were "California Day", "Contract", "Gypsy Cowboy", "Groupie", "On My Way Back Home", "It's Alright with Me", "Important Exportin' Man", and "Thank the Day".

== Personal life ==
He had a daughter, Rachael Torbert. He died of a heart attack at the age of 34.

== Discography ==
- Horses – Horses (1969)
- American Beauty – Grateful Dead (1970)
- New Riders of the Purple Sage – New Riders of the Purple Sage (1971)
- Powerglide – New Riders of the Purple Sage (1972)
- Ace – Bob Weir (1972)
- Gypsy Cowboy – New Riders of the Purple Sage (1972)
- The Adventures of Panama Red – New Riders of the Purple Sage (1973)
- Home, Home on the Road – New Riders of the Purple Sage (1974)
- Tiger Rose – Robert Hunter (1975)
- Kingfish – Kingfish (1976)
- Live 'n' Kickin' – Kingfish (1977)
- Trident – Kingfish (1978)
- Kingfish – Kingfish (1985)
- Vintage NRPS – New Riders of the Purple Sage (1986)
- Kingfish in Concert: King Biscuit Flower Hour – Kingfish (1996)
- Worcester, MA, 4/4/73 – New Riders of the Purple Sage (2003)
- Boston Music Hall, 12/5/72 – New Riders of the Purple Sage (2003)
- Veneta, Oregon, 8/27/72 – New Riders of the Purple Sage (2004)
- S.U.N.Y., Stonybrook, NY, 3/17/73 – New Riders of the Purple Sage (2007)
- Glendale Train – New Riders of the Purple Sage (2013)
- Thanksgiving in New York City – New Riders of the Purple Sage (2019)
- Bear's Sonic Journals: Dawn of the New Riders of the Purple Sage – New Riders of the Purple Sage (2020)
- Lyceum '72 – New Riders of the Purple Sage (2022)
