= John Dawson (musician) =

American musician

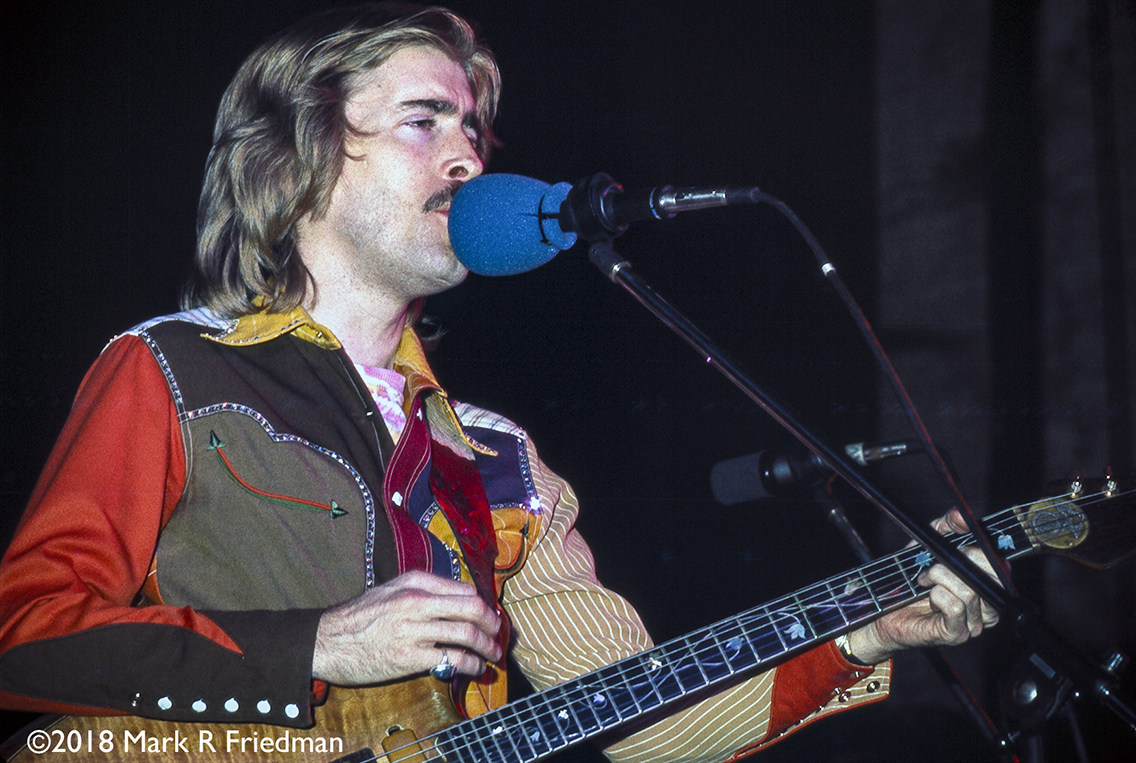
- John "Marmaduke" Dawson in 1973

Background information
- Also known as: Marmaduke
- Born: John Collins Dawson IV; June 16, 1945; Chicago, Illinois
- Origin: San Francisco, California, United States
- Died: July 21, 2009 (aged 64) San Miguel de Allende, Mexico
- Genres: Country rock
- Instruments: Vocals; guitar
- Years active: 1964–1997
- Formerly of: New Riders of the Purple Sage

John Collins Dawson IV (June 16, 1945 – July 21, 2009), nicknamed "Marmaduke", was an American musician, singer, and songwriter. He was best known as the leader and co-founder of the country rock band the New Riders of the Purple Sage. He sang lead vocals on most of the band's songs.

== Musical career ==
John Dawson's family moved to California in 1952. The son of a Los Altos Hills, California, filmmaker, he took guitar lessons from a teacher and friend from the Peninsula School in Menlo Park, California. For high school he attended the Millbrook School near Millbrook, New York. While at Millbrook, he took courses in music theory and history and sang in the glee club.

Dawson's musical career began in the mid-1960s folk music scene in the San Francisco Bay Area. There, he met fellow guitarist David Nelson, and was part of the rotating lineup of Mother McCree's Uptown Jug Champions, a jug band that included Jerry Garcia and several other future members of the Grateful Dead. Dawson was also heavily influenced by the Bakersfield sound genre of country music.

After a stint at Occidental College, Dawson remained in the Los Angeles metropolitan area for several years. By 1969, Dawson had returned to Los Altos Hills to attend courses at Foothill College. Along with Nelson, he also contributed to the sessions for Aoxomoxoa, the Grateful Dead's third studio album. He also began to write a number of country rock songs, a development coinciding with Garcia's newfound interest in playing pedal steel guitar. Joined by Nelson, they formed the New Riders of the Purple Sage. The New Riders became the opening act for the Grateful Dead, and their original lineup included Grateful Dead member Mickey Hart on drums as well as Garcia. Within a year, Dave Torbert replaced Bob Matthews on bass and Spencer Dryden replaced Hart in the New Riders lineup, with Garcia continuing to play in both bands. In 1970 and 1971, the New Riders and the Grateful Dead performed many concerts together. In November 1971, Buddy Cage replaced Jerry Garcia as the New Riders' pedal steel player, allowing NRPS to tour independently of the Dead.

During this same period, Dawson continued to appear as a guest musician on Grateful Dead studio albums, including Workingman's Dead (1970) and American Beauty (1970). With Jerry Garcia and Robert Hunter, he co-wrote the song "Friend of the Devil".

In the years that followed, Dawson and Nelson led a gradually evolving lineup of musicians in the New Riders of the Purple Sage, playing their psychedelic influenced brand of country rock and releasing a number of studio and live albums. Songwriting duties were generally divided between Dawson (who grew gradually less prolific before enjoying a resurgence on the band's final studio album) and a succession of three bassists: Torbert, Skip Battin (best known for his work with the Clarence White-era Byrds) and Roger McGuinn Band veteran Stephen A. Love. In 1982, David Nelson and Buddy Cage left the band. John Dawson and the New Riders carried on without them, taking on more of a bluegrass influence with the addition of multi-instrumentalist Rusty Gauthier and singer/guitarist Gary Vogensen ( https://garyvogensen.com) to the group. NRPS continued to tour intermittently and released the occasional album. Then, in 1997, Dawson retired from the music business, moved to Mexico, and became an English teacher, and the New Riders disbanded.

In 2005, David Nelson and Buddy Cage revived the New Riders of the Purple Sage, without Dawson's participation but with his agreement and moral support. Subsequently Dawson made several guest appearances at New Riders concerts.

Dawson died in Mexico of stomach cancer on July 21, 2009.
