= Mekia Kealakaʻi =

Mekia Kealakai
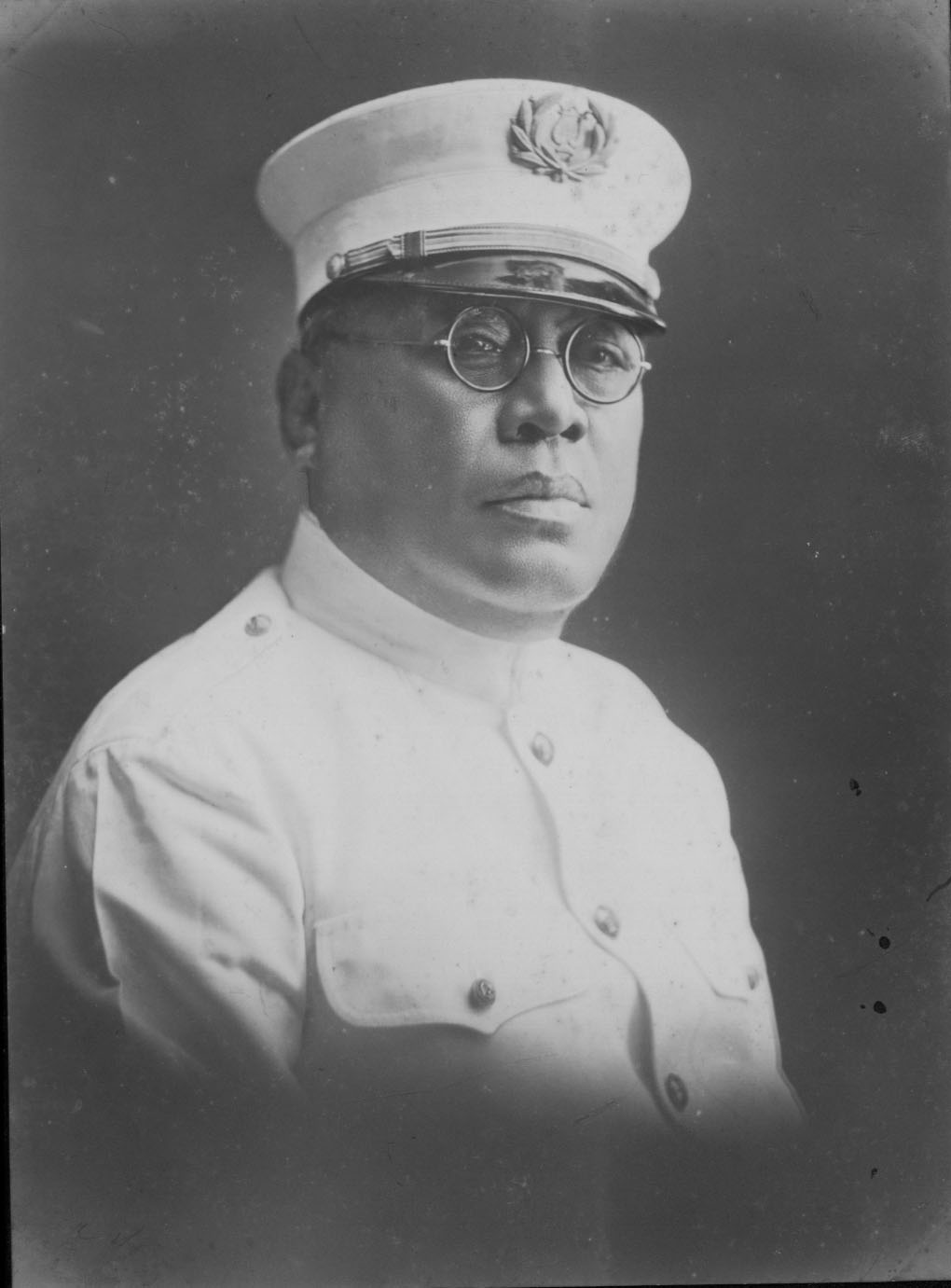

Background information
- Born: October 15, 1867; Oahu, Kingdom of Hawaii
- Died: March 31, 1944 (aged 76) ʻEwa Beach, Territory of Hawaii
- Occupations: Songwriter, composer

Mekia Kealakai (October 15, 1867– March 31, 1944) was a musician, composer and conductor of the Royal Hawaiian Band, as well as musical director of the Kawaihau Orchestra and Glee Club.

== Early life ==
He was born on Oahu, and incorrigible in his youth. He was sent to the Reformatory School of Honolulu, where he learned music from Royal Hawaiian Band conductor Henri Berger, who eventually made him a member of the band. He toured the mainland United States with the band in 1895, and off and on during his life span would be associated with the band until his retirement as a musician.

Kealakai, who played guitar, trombone and flute, eventually left the Royal Hawaiian Band, and at one time was a musical director of the Kawaihau Orchestra and Glee Club, touring the mainland United States. Within a couple of years, he had formed the Royal Hawaiian Orchestra and was playing in Idaho. While performing at the 1901 World's Fair, Kealakaʻi met and married hula dancer Mele Nawa`aheihei who remained with him the rest of her life. In 1914, under the name Major (English translation of Mekia) Kealakai, he published The Ukulele and How to Play It: Self Instructor for the Ukulele and Taro-Patch Fiddle.

== Conductor of the Royal Hawaiian Band ==
Honolulu mayor John H. Wilson, who had managed the Royal Hawaiian Band when Kealakai was member, recruited him in 1920 to conduct the band. During his tenure, Kealakai initiated a program to mentor Hawaii's youth in music education. He took a year's sabbatical from Hawaii in 1926 and embarked on a musical tour of Europe. After teaching at his old reformatory school upon his return to Hawaii, he was once again appointed conductor of the Royal Hawaiian Band, and remained with them until his retirement in 1932.

== Compositions ==
His composition of "Kawaihau Waltz" was first recorded as a duet by the guitarists David K. Kaili and Pale K. Lua on the Victor label in 1914, and in 1915 on the same label as the "B" side of "My Bird Of Paradise", by guitarists Helen and Frank Ferera in 1915. Ferera recorded the song three more times, in 1918 as a trio with Helen Ferera and Irene Greenus, in 1921 as a duet with Anthony J. Franchini, and in 1922 as a quartet instrumental. It was subsequently also recorded by numerous other artists. Many of Kealakai's compositions have continued to be recorded by Hawaiian artists such as Alfred Apaka, Sunday Manoa, The Brothers Cazimero, Andy Cummings, Gabby Pahinui and Sonny Chillingworth

Partial listing.

- "E Pele E"
- "Halena Medley"
- "Kawaihau Waltz"
- "Lei Awapuhi"
- "Na Lani Eha"
- "Pohai Ke Aloha" (co-written with Lena Machado)
- "Waipi‘o (to Kahalelaukoa) Beyond the Rainbow

== Retirement and legacy ==
He outlived his wife by five years, and died at his Ewa Beach home in 1944. A scholarship fund was set up in his name by the Royal Hawaiian Band.

He was inducted into the Hawaiian Music Hall of Fame in 1996.
