= Jenks "Tex" Carman =

American singer-songwriter

- Born: Jenkins Carman; May 14, 1903; Hardinsburg, Kentucky, United States
- Died: February 2, 1968 (age 64)
- Occupations: Singer-songwriter, musician
- Labels: Capitol Records

Jenkins "Tex" Carman (May 14, 1903 – February 2, 1968) was an American country music singer and musician active from the 1910s to the 1960s known for playing the Hawaiian Guitar.

== Biography ==
Born in Hardinsburg, Kentucky in 1903 and although Carman often claimed to be of Cherokee heritage there is no record of such listed with the Cherokee Nation of North Carolina where Carman's family are known to have originated. As a youth, Carman learned basic guitar as well as singing with a vocal quartet and was touring the local medicine show and vaudeville circuit. He recorded a single as a solo act in 1929 for Gennett Records which was not released.

Carman continued on as a solo act and with a sister touring and performing on the radio into the 1930s in Louisville, Kentucky and St. Louis, Missouri. During this time he met Frank Plada, a Hawaiian Guitar player who had made popular recordings for Gennett in the 1920s who introduced Carman to the instrument.

Carman's musical abilities were rather limited, consisting of simple single-note runs repeated with little attention given to a steady rhythm or conventional time keeping. Carman's sloppiness was made worse by his heavy drinking and he often did not bother to tune his guitar. His singing voice was similarly ragged, having a nasal twang and limited range. In spite of his musical limitations Carman remained popular with audiences due to his distinctive sound, easy going charm and humor.

Carman continued to tour, now as a solo act, for the rest of the 1940s and made his way west to Pasadena, California by end of the decade where he appeared on the radio on the NBC show Town Hall Party, as well as making a few solo recordings for 4 Star Records. Carman also performed on the then new medium of television. Carman learned showmanship from his vaudeville days, dressing in flamboyant cowboy outfits and calling himself Tex, at other times wearing an Indian headdress. He became a popular performer on television, appearing on shows "Town Hall Party with Tex Ritter and Johnny Bond and "Hometown Jamboree with Cliffie Stone. Stone introduced Carman to Capitol Records scout Ken Nelson who signed him to a contract in 1951. Carman would make numerous recordings for Capitol with some success for the rest of the decade.

The material recorded for Capitol ranged from Carman's preferred Hawaiian themed songs like "Hillbilly Hula", "Hilo March", and "Samoa Stomp" to sentimental ballads (many written by Carman) as well as a modern covers chosen by Ken Nelson who produced the sessions; "I Could Love You Darling" (originally done by Hank Locklin) and a version of "Dixie Cannonball" originally done by Gene Autry and Red Foley. Carman included a novelty song with a version of "When The Caissons Go Rolling Along" (ALA "The Army Goes Rolling Along") during which he imitated various sound effects on the fretboard. This was a particular audience favorite.

While Carman had previously performed solo Nelson insisted on a session band including veterans including at various times Joe Maphis (electric guitar and banjo), Jimmy Bryant (electric guitar), Cliffie Stone (bass), Eddie Kirk (guitar), Jimmy Pruett (piano) and Harold Hensley (fiddle). The band had trouble adapting to playing with Carman who was not used to playing with other musicians. Carman's unwillingness to stay to a steady beat or regular chord changes left band members scrambling to keep track of the songs. These problems were exacerbated by Carman's heavy drinking and lack of rehearsals some which shows in the quality of some of the singles. Carman's drinking was in turn exacerbated by his nervousness about recording and some sessions had to be cancelled. There were five recording sessions between 1951 and 1953 resulting in 20 singles, of which five were not released.

After his contract with Capitol was up Carman recorded an album for the small Sage & Sand label called The Ole Indian, the cover of which showed Carman in an Indian headdress. For the rest of the 1950s, he returned to appearing on radio and television in California including regular guest spots on "Cal's Corral" hosted by used car salesman Cal Worthington. By the mid-1960s Carman returned to Kentucky where he continued to make television and radio appearances until his death aged 64.

James Lien has written that Carman "may have been country music's Andy Kaufman."
