= Nani Alapai =

Hawaiian soprano singer (1874–1928)

Nani Alapai Nani Alapaʻi
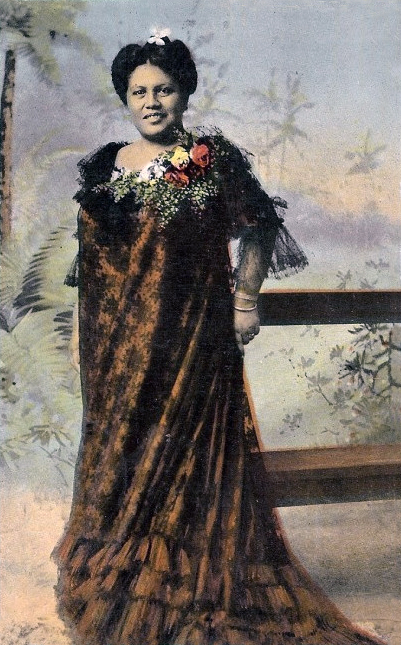
- Postcard c. 1900s

Background information
- Birth name: Julita Nani Malina
- Also known as: Madame Alapai
- Born: December 1, 1874; Līhuʻe, Kauaʻi, Kingdom of Hawaii
- Died: October 1, 1928 (aged 53); Territory of Hawaii, US
- Genres: Hawaiian
- Occupation(s): Vocalist, soprano
- Instrument: Vocals
- Labels: Victor; Columbia
- Formerly of: Royal Hawaiian Band

Nani Alapai (December 1, 1874 – October 1, 1928) was a Hawaiian soprano singer during the early 1900s. Despite not receiving any formal musical training, she was hired as a vocalist of the Royal Hawaiian Band by bandmaster Henri Berger. She became the leading prima donna of the early era of Hawaiian music through her traveling performances with the Royal Hawaiian Band in Hawaii and on the mainland United States. Recording a number of songs, she helped popularize "Aloha ʻOe" by Queen Liliʻuokalani with one of the earliest recordings of the song. She directly and indirectly influenced many later Hawaiian musicians including Lena Machado and her adoptive grandson Kahauanu Lake.

== Early life and family ==
Julita Nani Malina was born in Līhuʻe, on the island of Kauaʻi, on December 1, 1874. Her parents were Keokilele Halemanu Punana Ukeke (died 1913), a Native Hawaiian from Wainiha, and John Malina Sr, an early Filipino settler in Hawaii. Her father worked as a paniolo (cowboy) at Kipu Ranch, owned by William Hyde Rice, and received his surname from the Hawaiian pronunciation of Manila. The family surname has sometimes been spelled Molina. She had many siblings while growing up including five brothers and eight sisters. She received her education at a Roman Catholic boarding school for girls in Honolulu.

Around 1895, she married William J. Alapai and became known as Mrs. or Madame Alapai. On November 20, 1910, after the death of her first husband, she remarried to W. C. Luke and became known as Madame Alapai Luke. For an unknown reason, her marriage certificate listed her parents as Panakiko Kealii and Anna. Alapai and Luke were divorced by 1916, with her citing non-support in the court case.

She adopted and raised Cecelia Kuliaikanuʻuwaiʻaleʻale Waipa (1907–1981), granddaughter of former Hawaiian Royal Guard Captain Robert Parker Waipa—a member of the extended Parker ranching family of the island of Hawaii. Cecelia's first marriage was to Thomas C. Lake and she later married Prince David Kalākaua Kawānanakoa. A musical entertainer herself, Cecelia was the mother of Hawaiian musician and composer Kahauanu Lake, who received the Hawai'i Academy of Recording Arts Lifetime Achievement Award in 1989, and was inducted into the Hawaiian Music Hall of Fame in 2004.

== Musical career ==
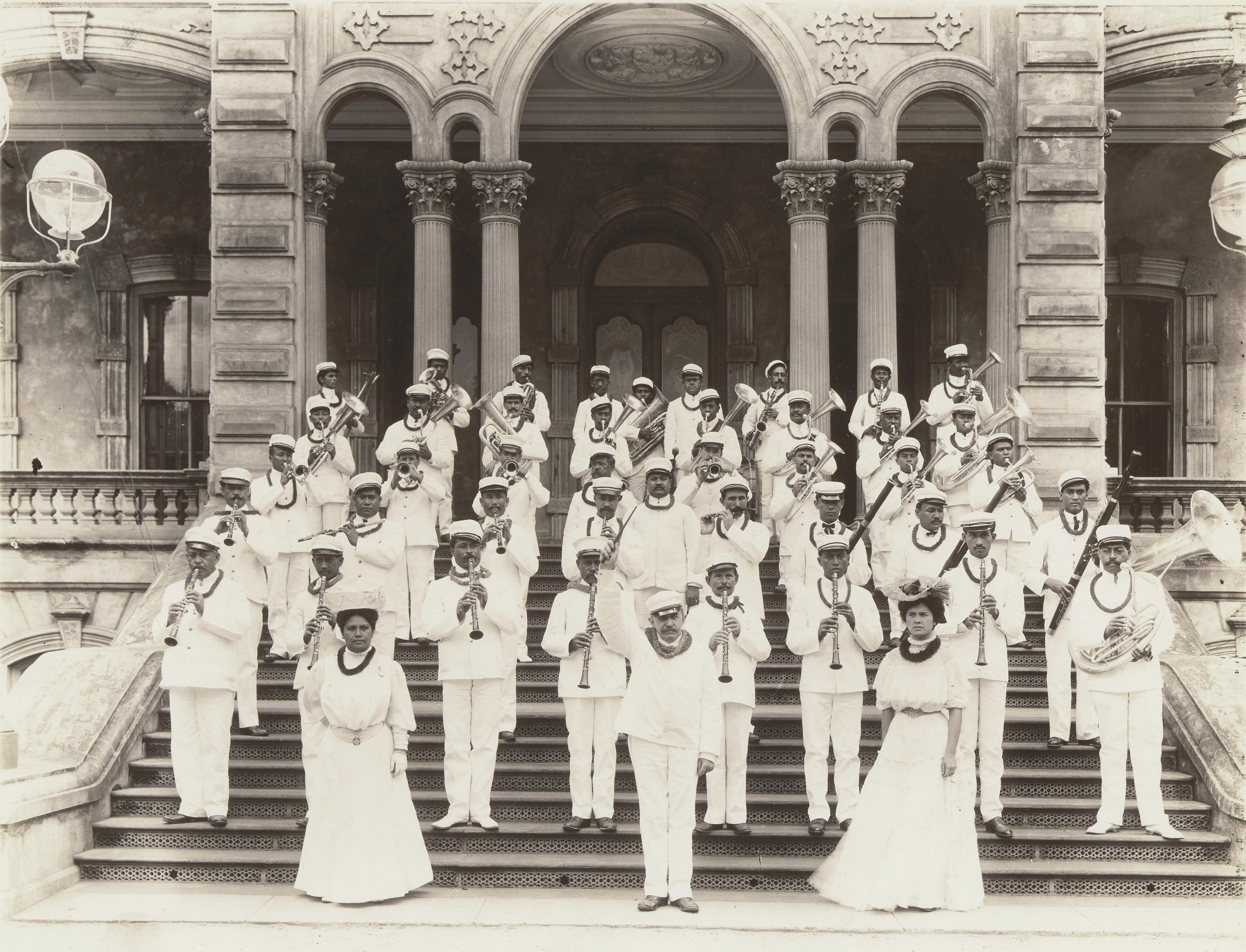
Royal Hawaiian Band shown in 1906 with Madame Alapai standing on the left.

Alapai received no formal musical training, but learned how to sing by entertaining audiences. There is disagreement about her tenure with the Royal Hawaiian Band. Based on her 1906 biography printed in the Hawaiian language newspaper Ka Nupepa Kuokoa, she joined the band around 1897 (nine years before the publication of the biography). At the time, Henri Berger was bandmaster and hired her to sing with the Band as a female soprano soloist. Later erroneous sources, including the personal interviews of Kahauanu Lake, and articles written in the Haʻilono Mele newsletters of the 1970s, claimed she was the band's first female vocalist, debuting with them in 1873, singing with the band for 40 or 43 years. However, census records taken during her second marriage show that she was not even born in 1873.

She accompanied the band on many of their 1905 appearances in the continental United States. Contemporary newspaper accounts describe how her voice enchanted the people of Portland, Oregon. When she sang there with the Band, the Oregon Daily Journal noted, "Her voice is naturally sweet and her talent distinctively native. She is ambitious for operatic work, and there is just a prospect that she may lead a native opera company in Honolulu within a short time."

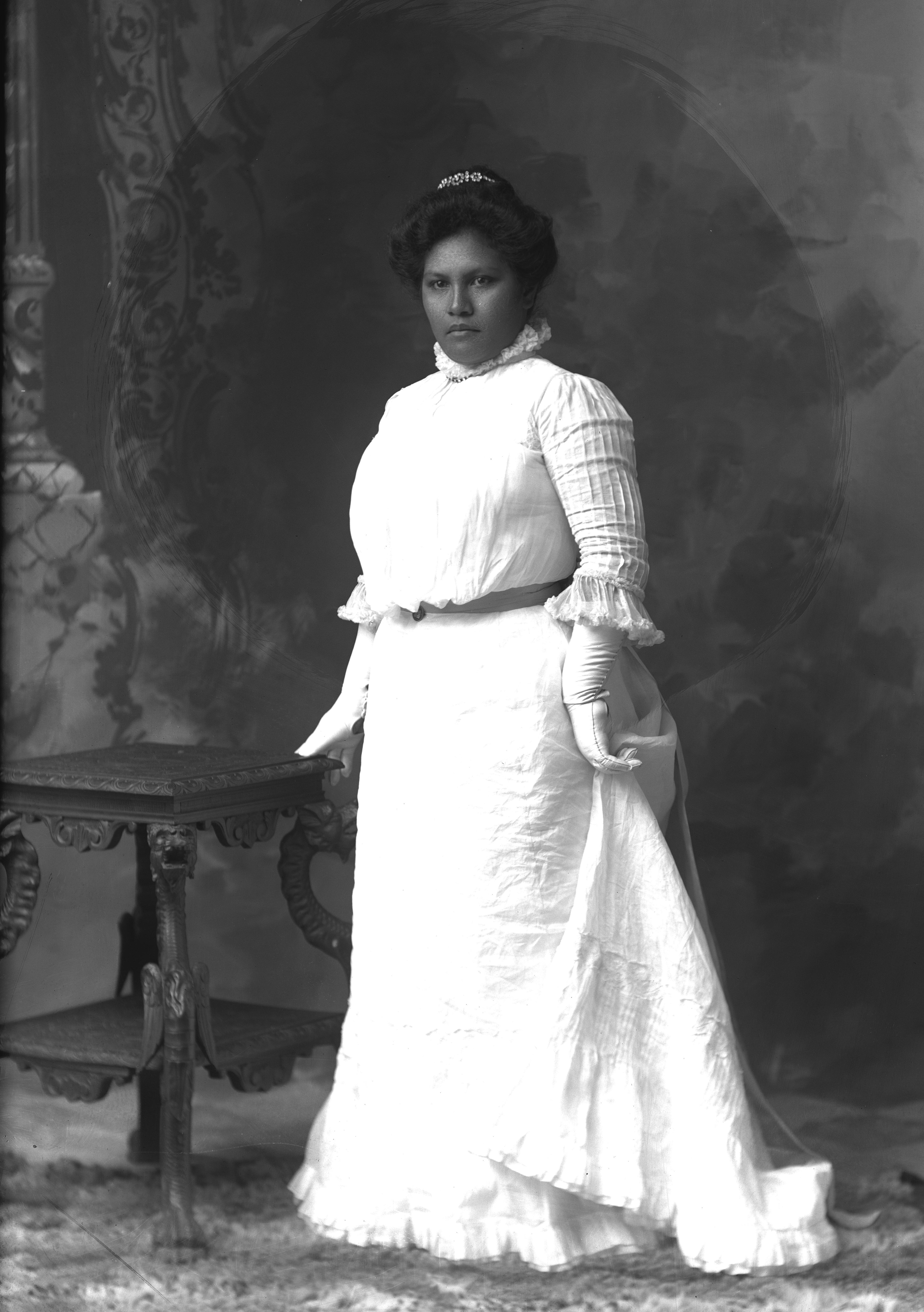
Nani Alapai, the Hawaiian prima donna, c. 1900s

During her career, she became known as the Prima Donna or Kāhuli of the Royal Hawaiian Band. The latter is a reference to the Oʻahu tree snails (Kāhuli in Hawaiian) which according to Hawaiian folklore are able to vocalize and sing sweet songs. Visiting the islands in 1907, Charmian London and her husband, American writer Jack London, heard her sing during a luau. Charmian noted:

She sang for us without reserve, out of her very good repertory. Her voice is remarkable, and I never heard another of its kind, for it is more like a stringed instrument than anything I can think of—metallic, but sweetly so, pure and true as a lark's, with falls and slurs that are indescribably musical and human. The love-eyed men and women lounging about her with their guitars and ukuleles, garlanded with drooping roses and carnations and ginger, were commendably vain of showing off their first singer in the land, and thrummed their loveliest to her every song. No one can touch strings as do these people. Their fingers bestow caresses to which wood and steel and cord become sentient and tremblingly responsive.

In May 1906, Alapai was scheduled to accompany the band on their second continental tour of the United States. Her husband, who worked as the driver of a delivery wagon, wanted to accompany the band on the tour to protect his wife, but Joel C. Cohen, the group's manager, was unwilling to raise the extra funds for his travel expenses. The conflict between the two men resulted in Nani Alapai leaving the tour and being replaced as the lead female singer by Annie Leilehua Brown, one of her understudies. Cohen aired his frustration with the unreasonable request to the press, much to the chagrin of Nani Alapai, who defended her husband and refused to reconsider. She later explained the affair by saying, "Oh, they wanted me to go, but I refused." Despite this, she continued to sing for the band in Hawaii with other female soloists such as Annie Leilehua Brown and Julia Kaleipolihale Chilton. In 1912, Alapai was offered a spot on Henry N. Clark's tour of Europe with his group, although it is not certain whether she went ahead with the trip.

Aloha Oe
Aloha Oe by Madam Alapai and Henry N. Clark

Alapai recorded a number of Hawaiian songs for the Victor Talking Machine Company in 1904, including many solos and duets with William Sumner Ellis and the Ellis Brothers Glee Club. She also recorded a number of songs with Joseph Kamakau and the Kamakau Glee Club.

She was also regarded as one of the first vocalists to publicly perform Queen Liliʻuokalani's song "Aloha ʻOe" and helped popularize it in the United States. In 1911, she sang and recorded the song in a duet with Henry N. Clark for the Columbia Records company. This was not the first recording of the song: a catalogue issued by Columbia Records in 1901 mentions an earlier wax cylinder recording of "Aloha ʻOe", although it is uncertain whether this was made in Hawaii or if the performer was Hawaiian. The 1901 cylinders did not survive.

In a bill written by Senator John Henry Wise, the Hawaii Territorial Senate granted Alapai a pension in 1921. She died on October 1, 1928. Her obituary in The Honolulu Advertiser noted that she "possessed a rich voice of wide range and excelled particularly in the rendition of the sweet songs of her native land. In her prime and even until very recently her services were in much demand at concerts and parties, particularly where Hawaiian music was featured." The Hawaiian language newspaper Ka Hoku O Hawaii wrote: "Haaheo na Hawaii i kela keikamahine leo nani no oo e ke kiwi o ke kuahiwi." ("Hawaiians are proud of this girl whose voice was as sweet as the ʻIʻiwi bird of the forest."

== Legacy ==
Madame Alapai's protégés and students included Annie Leilehua Brown and the Hawaiian soprano-falsetto singer and composer Lena Machado. Known as "Hawaiʻi's Songbird", Machado was a leading performer of the Golden Age of Hawaiian music during the 1930s and 1940s, and was posthumously inducted into the Hawaiian Music Hall of Fame in 1995. Historian George Kanahele described how Machado sang with the "Hawaiian style reminiscent of Nani Alapai, Juliana Walanika, and Helen Desha Beamer." Although he was born after Alapai's death, and never heard her perform, her grandson Kahauanu Lake credited her, his mother and his Parker relations with influencing his musical career. In a 1979 interview, he noted:

I never heard my grandmother sing. In fact, she died before I was born. She retired in 1907 after 40 years with the Royal Hawaiian Band. They said that there was one voice that could sing above the band – and we had no microphones in those days – and could be heard for more than two blocks. And not just powerful, but sweet. It was Hawaiian, it was not that operatic thing. She never did lose the Hawaiian oli, the haʻi was in the right place, the accents, you know. In one of her songs, where it goes, "No ka mahina malamalama," she would say, "No ka mahina ma lamalama." That's the uweuwe from the ancient way of chanting.

== Discography ==
Partial listing. Sources: DAHR, UC Santa Barbara and Library of Congress' National Jukebox:

Title	Date	Notes
"Hilo kupa loke"	July 1904	Female vocal solo and chorus, with orchestra (Hawaiian)
"Auhea lau vahine"	July 1904	Female vocal solo and chorus, with orchestra (Hawaiian)
"Pua carnation"	July 1904	Female vocal solo, with orchestra (Hawaiian)
"Mahina malamalama"	July 1904	Female vocal solo and chorus, with orchestra (Hawaiian)
"Hilo kupu loke"	July 1904	Female vocal solo and chorus, with orchestra (Hawaiian)
"Hone a'e nei"	July 1904	vocal solo and chorus, with orchestra (Hawaiian)
"He inoa no waipio"	July 1904	Female vocal solo and chorus, with orchestra (Hawaiian)
"Moani ke ala"	July 1904	Female vocal solo and chorus, with orchestra (Hawaiian)
"Wai mapuna"	July 1904	Female vocal solo and chorus, with orchestra (Hawaiian)
"Ahea oe"	July 1904	Female vocal solo and chorus, with orchestra (Hawaiian)
"Laau hooula ike kino"	July 1904	Female-male vocal duet, with orchestra (Hawaiian)
"Uluha"	July 1904	Female-male vocal duet, with orchestra (Hawaiian). With the Ellis Brothers Glee Club and W. S. Ellis.
"Sweet lei mamo"	July 1904	Female-male vocal duet, with orchestra (Hawaiian). With the Ellis Brothers Glee Club and W. S. Ellis.
"Mai poina oe ia'u"	July 1904	Female-male vocal duet (Hawaiian). With the Ellis Brothers Glee Club and W. S. Ellis.
"Ua like no a like"	July 1904	Female-male vocal duet (Hawaiian). With the Ellis Brothers Glee Club and W. S. Ellis.
"Lei poni moi"	July 1904	Female-male vocal duet and chorus, with orchestra (Hawaiian). With the Ellis Brothers Glee Club and H. Keaweamahi
"Polka I"	July 1904	Female-male vocal duet and chorus, with orchestra (Hawaiian). With the Ellis Brothers Glee Club and H. Keaweamahi
"Aloha ʻOe"	c. 1911	Duet with Henry N. Clark for the Columbia Records company

== Bibliography ==
- Kanahele, George S. (1979). Hawaiian Music and Musicians: An Illustrated History. University Press of Hawaii. ISBN 978-0-8248-0578-4. OCLC 903648649.
- Kanahele, George S.; Berger, John (2012). Hawaiian Music and Musicians: An Encyclopedic History. Honolulu: Mutual Publishing. ISBN 978-1-56647-967-7. OCLC 808415079.
- Peterson, Barbara Bennett, ed. (1984). Notable Women of Hawaii. Honolulu: University of Hawaii Press. ISBN 978-0-8248-0820-4. OCLC 11030010.
