= Schetrompf =

Schetrompf is a surname. Notable people with the surname include:

- Doris Schetrompf, later Rose Lee Maphis, American country singer
- Stanley Schetrompf, architect of Hagerstown Speedway, Maryland, United States
