= Hawaii County Band =

Municipal band in Hawaiʻi

The Hawaiʻi County Band is a municipal band founded in 1883. It is the second oldest professional musical organization in the State of Hawaii. Only the Royal Hawaiian Band, founded in 1836, is older.

The Hawaiʻi County Band, based in Hilo, is composed of approximately 40 part-time musicians and a full-time director and is part of the Parks and Recreation Department of the County of Hawaiʻi. The band performs for free at ceremonies, festivals, parades, dedications and many other public events throughout Hawaiʻi Island (variously nicknamed "The Orchid Island," "The Volcano Island, and "The Big Island"). The band performs a monthly concert at Moʻoheau Park in downtown Hilo.

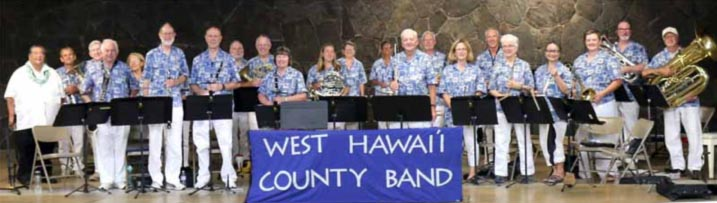
Members of the West Hawai'i County Band with director Bernaldo Evangalista

The West Hawaiʻi County Band, based in Kailua-Kona on the Kona Coast of Hawaiʻi Island, is an independent sub-unit of the Hawai'i County Band. As a civic band The West Hawaiʻi County Band can be heard at regular monthly concerts in Kailua-Kona as well as performing in numerous parades and civic events on the west side of Hawaiʻi Island.

== History ==
The Hawaiʻi County Band was founded in 1883 by two brothers from Portugal, Joaquin and Jules Carvalho. They emigrated from the Azores and made a living as barbers in Hilo, on the island of Hawaiʻi. The brothers would close their barbershop, perform at scheduled concerts and go back to cutting hair afterwards. Joaquin was the conductor and Jules played the cornet.

The band survived the overthrow of the Kingdom of Hawaii in 1893 and the period of the Republic of Hawaii (1894–1898). It was absorbed by the newly created County of Hawaiʻi during the territorial period (1898–1959). It was known as the Hilo Band (or the Hilo Portuguese Band). After the creation of the county system in the Territory of Hawaii in 1900 it officially became the Hawaiʻi County Band in 1905.

After Joaquin died in 1924, the band had several directors. Urban Carvalho, son of co-founder Jules Carvalho, led the band from 1943 to 1963. Frank Vierra went on to become the director of the Royal Hawaiian Band.

== Directors ==
=== Hawaiʻi County Band (Hilo), ===
There have been 12 directors of the band:

1. Joaquin Carvalho (1883–1924)
2. Paul Tallett (1924–1925)
3. Frank Vierra (1925–1933)
4. Frank Wrigley (1933–1938)
5. Gabriel Wela (1938–1943)
6. Urban Carvalho (1943–1963)
7. Andres Baclig (1963–1974)
8. Armando Mendoza (1974–1981 / 1983–1984)
9. John Hursey (1981–1983)
10. David Lorch (1984–1993)
11. Wayne Kawakami (1993–2001)
12. Paul Arceo (2001–present)

=== The West Hawaiʻi County Band (Kailua-Kona) ===
1. David Lorch
2. Gary Ventimiglia
3. Lisa Archuletta
4. Charlie Peebles
5. Lisa Archuletta
6. Bernaldo Evangelista
7. Lisa Archuleta
8. Bernaldo Evangalista
9. Richard Shields
10. Gerald Carrell
11. Richard Shields (as of 2025)

== Today ==
Unlike the Royal Hawaiian Band, the Hawaiʻi County Bands are not full-time bands. Except for the band director, the musicians in the Hawaiʻi County bands are employed by County of Hawaiʻi Department of Parks and Recreation on a part-time basis. Some members have been with the band for many years. One exceptional trombonist in his eighties has been with the band continuously for over 60 years. The West Hawaiʻi County Band also includes a number of volunteer musicians including retired professional musicians, music teachers and others from all walks of life.

=== Uniforms ===
==== Hawaiʻi County Band ====
The uniform for the Hawaiʻi County Band is a red and white aloha shirt. Cross-striped fabric patterns, similar to those of Scottish kilts, were imported from England in the late 19th century as uniforms for the workers on the sugarcane plantations in Hawaii and are still popular apparel among the locals in Hawaii.

==== West Hawaiʻi County Band ====
The uniform for the West Hawaiʻi County Band is currently (June 2019) a blue patterned aloha shirt and white pants. When the band performs as the Huliheʻe Palace Band the uniform changes to a white aloha shirt with red sash.

=== Performances ===
==== Hawaiʻi County Band ====
Monthly concerts are at the Moʻoheau Park bandstand in downtown Hilo, usually on the second Saturday of each month at noon. The Moʻoheau Park Bandstand is a historic structure dating back to 1904, though some accounts claim the bandstand is even older, making it the performing home of the band for at least 106 years. It is also the center for cultural events, political rallies and other downtown Hilo events.

==== West Hawaiʻi County Band ====
Monthly concerts are generally the 3rd Sunday of each month starting at 4pm and take place at Hale Halawai County Park on Aliʻi Drive in Kailua-Kona. In addition the band can be heard at numerous civic events including Memorial and Veteran's Day at the West Hawaiʻi Veterans Cemetery and local parades including The Fourth of July and Christmas parades in Kailua-Kona.

== Current Events ==
In February 2010, the Hawaiʻi County Mayor Billy Kenoi announced he was eliminating the Hawaiʻi County Band to help balance the county budget. If the proposed budget is accepted by the Hawaii County Council, it will effectively put an end to the Hawaiʻi County Band as an organization.

- As of June 2019, The Hawai'i County Bands are included in the county budget.
