= Alapai (disambiguation) =

Alapaʻi (died 1754) was a Chief of Hawaiʻi.

Alapai may also refer to:

- Julia Alapai (c. 1814–1849), high chiefess of the Kingdom of Hawaii and granddaughter of Alapaʻi
- Alapai Wahine (late 18th–early 19th century), princess of the Island of Hawaii
- Nani Alapai (1874–1928), Hawaiian soprano singer
