= Lena Machado =

American singer

Background information
- Born: Lena Kaulumau Wai‘ale‘ale; October 16, 1903; Pauoa Valley, Oahu, Territory of Hawaii
- Died: January 23, 1974 (aged 70) Honolulu, Hawaii
- Genre: Hawaiian falsetto
- Occupation: Vocalist
- Instrument: Ukulele

Lena Machado (October 16, 1903 – January 23, 1974) was a Hawaiian singer, composer, and ukulele player, known as "Hawaii's Songbird". She was among the first group of musical artists honored by the Hawaiian Music Hall of Fame in 1995. Noted for her use of the Hawaiian vocal technique of "ha'i," which emphasizes the transition between a singer's lower and falsetto vocal ranges, and her use of "kaona" (hidden meaning) when writing song lyrics, she entertained primarily in Hawaii and the mainland United States. She sold leis on the Honolulu piers as a child, and aspired to become a singer like the women she saw greeting incoming passengers. KGU radio manager Marion A. Mulroney discovered her as she sang in a mango tree next door to his home. She performed regularly on KGU, where Royal Hawaiian Band conductor Mekia Kealakaʻi heard her and hired her as a featured soloist in 1925. Her association with the Royal Hawaiian Band would last five decades. During World War II, she had her own radio show on KGU.

== Early life ==
Lena Kaulumau Wai‘ale‘ale was born October 16, 1903, in the Pauoa Valley. Her mother was Native Hawaiian musician Louise Makakoa Poepoe, and her father was Oscar J. Kreuter, a San Francisco born son of German immigrants. Her father has been widely, and erroneously, reported as Hawaiian composer and vocalist Robert Wai‘ale‘ale (Louise Poepoe’s first husband), who in fact died of typhoid fever sixteen months before Lena’s birth. Oscar Kreuter had come to Hawaii in 1899, staying with his brother, Charles, who was a trumpeter with the Royal Hawaiian Band. Oscar returned to San Francisco, where he died in 1909. Lena was hānai (informally adopted) at birth by Mary Davis Pan and her husband Loon Pan. The practice of hānai-ing a birth child to an adoptive family was an accepted cultural practice among Hawaiians. As a result of hearing the Hawaiian language in her birth home, Chinese spoken in the Pan family, and English spoken throughout Hawaii, Lena grew up multilingual.

The Loo Pan family were not musical, and discouraged her interest in singing. Nevertheless, Lena learned to play the ukulele and won first prize singing "Let Me Call You Sweetheart" in a contest her birth family entered her into. Many images of her over the decades would show her accompanying herself on the ukulele. Her hānai family put her to work selling leis on the Honolulu piers before she reached the age of 10. In later years, she reflected on Julia K. Chilton and Lizzie Alohikea being her role models when she watched them sing for incoming passengers at the piers. After attending Kauluwela Elementary School, she then attended Sacred Hearts Academy.

== Discovery and early career ==
Her singing style has been described as a yodel, female falsetto, or "ha'i". The "ha'i" is the sound of the voice break as it moves to the upper range. She was part of the vanguard of Hawaiian women who sang in this style. Historian George Kanahele described how Lena sang with the "Hawaiian style reminiscent of Nani Alapai, Juliana Walanika, and Helen Desha Beamer."

The story of her discovery by KGU radio manager Marion A. Mulroney hearing her singing in a mango tree is often told as having happened at the YWCA in Honolulu, which had not been built at the time. In Machado's own recollections, she was indeed singing in the mango tree in that spot, but in that era the property was her aunt's home. Mulroney lived next door. Her initial booking on KGU was meant to be a 10-minute set. Listeners phoned in such large numbers that she ended up singing for an hour.

Lena married Wan Sung in 1919, and was using the name “Lena Apang” for her performances in the early 1920s. In 1926, at the age of 22, as Lena Apang, she married her second husband, police officer Luciano K. Machado, with whom she formed The Machado Troupe consisting of their combined family members. The troupe performed regularly on KGU, entertained at military installations in Hawaii, and by 1927 had already toured the mainland United States. That same year, Lena took first prize at a singing contest in Honolulu. She was hired by George Paele Mossman as a Hawaiian dance and singing instructor at his newly opened Bell Tone Studio of Music. Lena was being referred to in the news media as "The Song – Bird of Hawaii", and was working with the Johnny Noble orchestra. With variations on the nickname, Lena would become known in Hawaiian music history as "Hawaii's Songbird"

In March 1928, Brunswick Records sent a team to Honolulu to record local singers. Lena was featured on a number of the records, with a variety of different other singers.

== Royal Hawaiian Band ==
From 1925 until 1971, she sang with the Royal Hawaiian Band, either as one of the featured vocalists, or as a guest vocalist for special concerts. Her tenure with the band and its conductors was tested over the decades. After hearing her sing, and hearing so much about her, conductor Mekia Kealakaʻi gave her a spot in 1925 as a featured vocalist with the band. When the 1927 maiden voyage of the SS Malolo reached Oahu's shores, the island greeted the ship with a welcoming pageant composed of 300 Hawaiian entertainers and royal descendants. Lena was chosen to be one of the band's soloists for the pageant, along with Nani Alapai and Lizzie Alohikea.

All employees of the Royal Hawaiian Band were on the city's payroll, but not contracted exclusively. In 1930, Lena starred in a musical stage production of "White Shadows", possibly inspired by the 1928 film White Shadows in the South Seas. The show was directed by "Prince Leilani" (real name Edwin Kaumualiiokamokuokalani Rose), who booked the show for a month's tour of Australia. Lena was not part of the touring company.

When Charles E. King took over as bandmaster, Lena resigned in 1931 over a salary dispute and devoted her energies to The Machado Troupe. During her absence from the band, she continued her career, including a 1934 performance of her composition "Roosevelt Hula" for President Franklin D. Roosevelt at a reception hosted by Territorial Governor Joseph Poindexter.

She returned to the band under the direction of Frank J. Vierra. In a series of events that stretched from February through March 1935, Lena was pulled into a political dispute between the city auditor Edwin P. Murray and Mayor George F. Wright. At issue were 121 city employee pay raises approved by the board of supervisors, which Murray rejected as being over the percentage allowed for raises. Without consulting her, Mayor Wright announced a lawsuit filed on her behalf as a test case over the issue. Band leader Vierra explained her absence as a walkout over creative content of her lyrics. While she was being treated at St. Francis Hospital for a nervous breakdown, Vierra dismissed her from the band, but re-hired her within three days. In 1937, Lena became the victim of forgery and attempted extortion by the assistant band manager B. H. Zablan and his wife. Vierra fired both Lena and the assistant band manager.

== World War II and post-war ==
After being dismissed from the Royal Hawaiian Band, she began performing in San Francisco, bringing her troupe to the Golden Gate International Exposition. First hired for only a two-week gig, they were so well received by the audiences that they were held over for the run of the exposition. Her return to Honolulu in February 1941 ended a four-year absence from the islands, with a concert at the Civic Auditorium sponsored by the Hawaiian Lei Sellers Association.

Under the direction of conductor Domenico Moro in 1941, she appeared as a guest soloist with the Royal Hawaiian Band. Reacting to public requests for her to become the band's regular featured soloist, the government's board of supervisors allocated $2,000 for her to accompany the band to Hawaii's outlying areas, including military installations. Beginning in 1943, Lena had her own radio show on KGU. A worldwide radio broadcast that continued through 1947, it featured regular musicians Sam Kaʻeo, Lani Sang, Roy Ah Mook Sang, George Pokini, Sonny Nicholas, "Little Joe" Kekauoha, and Edith Naʻauao. Several sources claim Lena was the first woman in the United States to host her own radio show; however, The Kate Smith Hour began on CBS Radio in 1931 and continued into the next decade.

In late 1948 and early 1949, she toured the mainland United States. In September 1949, Lena and several Honolulu investors filed for incorporation of the Pago Pago Night Club. The club had previously existed with different owners. Under its new owners, it opened September 29, 1949, serving 300 customers through the night. Lena and band leader Ray Andrade were the featured entertainment.

== Later life and death ==
She continued to perform in Hawaii, and in July 1952 took her troupe to Chicago, to perform at "Harry's Waikiki" nightclub owned by Hawaii residents Harry and Alice Nakamura. The troupe remained at the venue for several months, playing to a packed house each night, returning to Hawaii in May 1953. While entertaining on the mainland in March 1956, a fall in a friend's home sidelined her in a wheelchair for months with a broken hip and ribs. Although predicted to be in rehabilitation for more than a year, she was performing again by October, "At first I crawled, then I held the walls, next I used a cane, and now I walk, drive and do a little dancing."

Her husband Luciano Machado died in 1957. In her own later obituary, it stated her only pregnancies were stillbirths. However, Lena was step-mother to Catherine Ualani and Rosaline Piilani, Luciano’s two daughters from his first marriage to Catherine Kakalia Hilea . That marriage ended in divorce in 1922, with Luciano being granted custody of the girls.

Two years after Luciano's death, she married widower Samuel Kaiwi, and went into semi-retirement in 1963. Driving to their new home on Kauai in 1965, she and her husband survived a car accident, but Lena was permanently blinded in one eye, and additional injuries left her physically challenged. She once again joined the Royal Hawaiian Band in 1971, under director Kenneth K. Kawashima, for a Veterans Day concert at Kapiolani Park. In 1973, she broke her hip, and her medical care and rehabilitation were so extensive and costly that vocalist Genoa Keawe hosted a benefit concert in Honolulu. She died January 23, 1974.

During Hawaiian Music Week in November 1974, entertainment editor Wayne Harada at The Honolulu Advertiser produced a list of Hawaii's music memories, that included "Lena Machado, belting out a song, with trusty ukulele in place." South Seas Records re-released an album of her songs that December, remastered for stereo. In 1995, Lena was in the first group of entertainers honored by the Hawaiian Music Hall of Fame.

== Discography ==
=== Compositions ===
The Hawaiian dictionary definition of "kaona" is, "Hidden meaning, as in Hawaiian poetry; concealed reference, as to a person, thing, or place; words with double meanings that might bring good or bad fortune." How to craft that into a song, or "hula ku‘i", was a skill Lena learned as a child when she sold leis on the piers. That ability served her well as she became adept at composing and presenting "hula ku‘i" to the audience.

Partial listing. Source:

- "Ei Nei"
- "E Ku'u Baby Hot Cha Cha"
- "Holau"
- "Ho'onanea"
- "Holo W'a Pa"
- "Hooipo Hula"
- "Hoonanea"
- "Kamalani o Keaukaha"
- "Kaulana O Hilo Hanakahi"
- "Kauoha Mai (Keyhole Hula)"
- "Ku'u Wā Li'ili'i (My Childhood Days)"
- "Mai Lohilohi Mai Oe"
- "Moani Ke Ala Oha Pua Makahikina"
- "Mom"
- "Roosevelt Hula"
- "U'ilani Mai" (Heavenly Beauty)

=== Recordings ===
Partial list, sources as noted.

- 1928 "Beautiful Kahana"/"Na Lei O Hawaii" – Brunswick Records, as Lena Waialeale Machado
- 1937 "Akaka Falls" – Decca Records
- 1937 "Hooipo Hula" (also composer) – Decca Records
- 1937 "Hui'e " – Decca Records
- 1937 "Kalena" – Decca Records
- 1937 "Mauna Kea " – Decca Records
- 1937 "O Ko'u Aloha" – Decca Records
- 1937 "Uluwehi O Kaala" – Decca Records
- 1947 "Kaulana O Hilo Hanakahi" (also composer) – Performer listed as "Lena Machado Hawaii's Songbird and her Hawaiians" – Columbia Records
- 1962 "Hoonanea" (also composer) – Hawaii's Song Bird Records

== Bibliography ==
- Dunning, John (1998). On the Air: The Encyclopedia of Old-Time Radio. New York, NY: Oxford University Press. pp. 382–384. ISBN 978-0-19-507678-3.
- Hune, Shirley; Nomura, Gail (2003). "Passed into the Present: Women in Hawaiian Entertainment". In Stillman, Amy Ku‘uleialoha (ed.). Asian/Pacific Islander American Women: A Historical Anthology. NYU Press. ISBN 978-0-8147-9097-7 – via Project MUSE.
- Kanahele, George S. (1979). Hawaiian Music and Musicians: An Illustrated History. University Press of Hawaii. ISBN 978-0-8248-0578-4. OCLC 903648649.
- Peterson, Barbara Bennett, ed. (1984). Notable Women of Hawaii. Honolulu: University of Hawaii Press. ISBN 978-0-8248-0820-4. OCLC 11030010.
