= Hilo March =

Song
- Language: Hawaiian
- Genre: Hawaiian music
- Composer: Joseph Kapeau Ae`a

"Hilo March" is a Hawaiian popular song written by Joseph Kapeau Aeʻa. It was originally called "Ke Ala Tuberose". It has been covered by a number of musicians, Polynesian and non-Polynesian alike. It was also used in the soundtrack of SpongeBob SquarePants (arranged by Jan Rap as "Hilo March", and arranged by Kapono Beamer as "Old Hilo March").

== About the song ==
It has been adopted as the school song by the University of Hawaii at Hilo. Along with another popular song, "Aloha ʻOe", every person from child to senior citizen know is said to the words and music to these songs. Originally the song was called "Ke Ala Tuberose" and was composed by Joseph Kapeau Aeʻa, who was a member of the Royal Hawaiian Band and also a friend of Princess Liliuokalani. The princess requested Aeʻa and the band come to Hilo and that is where he composed the song. In August 1881, the title was changed from "Ke Ala Tuberose" to "Hilo March" and played by the Royal Hawaiian band under Captain Henri Berger's direction. Besides being a favorite of the Royal Hawaiian band and its popularity in the Islands, it has been picked up as a favorite by many steel guitarists on the mainland. The lyrics of the song tell of Hilo's beauty as well as the beauty of the Lehua flower.

== Covers ==
It has been covered by artists such as Trevor Edmondson, Christopher Homer & Raney Van Vink, the Four Hawaiians, Lani McIntyre and his Aloha Islanders, the Mena Moeria Minstrels, Tau Moe's Original Hawaiians, Johnny Pineapple And His Orchestra, Hank Snow, Bashful Brother Oswald, and Bill Wolfgramme and his Islanders
