= Cal Worthington =

American automobile salesman

- Worthington in a 1989 commercial with his dog Spot (here, an iguana)
- Born: Calvin Coolidge Worthington; November 27, 1920; Shidler, Oklahoma Oklahoma, U.S.
- Died: September 8, 2013 (aged 92); Orland, California, U.S.
- Other names: Calvin Worthington; Cal Coolidge Worthington
- Occupation: Car dealer
- Known for: A long-standing series of offbeat television commercials featuring "my dog Spot"
- Spouse: 4 (divorced)
- Children: Rod Worthington; Barbara Worthington; Calvin Worthington; Courtney Worthington Shepherd; Susan Skellenger; Coldren Worthington
- Parent: Benjamin Franklin Worthington
- Relatives: 8 siblings
- Military career
- Branch: United States Army Air Corps
- Service years: c. 1942–1945
- Rank: Captain
- Unit: 390th Bombardment Group
- Conflicts: World War II (29 bombing missions over Germany)
- Awards: Air Medal with four Oak leaf clusters; Distinguished Flying Cross
- Website: worthingtonfordnewcars.com

Calvin Coolidge Worthington (November 27, 1920 – September 8, 2013) was an American car dealer, best known in Southern California and other parts of the West Coast of the United States for his offbeat radio and television advertisements for the Worthington Dealership Group. At its peak, the dealership chain spanned the western and southwestern United States. He also made minor appearances and was parodied in various films and television programs.

Worthington became widely recognized for his commercials, often introduced with the catchphrase, "Here's Cal Worthington and his dog Spot!" Despite the phrase, "Spot" was never a dog, but rather an exotic animal—or even a vehicle—featured in the commercial. The campaign ran from the 1960s through the 1990s.

A 1990 profile in The Sacramento Bee noted that Worthington grossed $316.8 million in 1988, making him the largest individual owner of a car dealership chain at the time. His advertising agency, Spot Advertising, handled a $15 million commercial budget—reportedly the largest of any U.S. auto dealer. Worthington sold automobiles from 1945 until his death and also owned a 24,000-acre (9,700 ha; 38 sq mi) ranch near Orland, California.

== Early life ==
Calvin Coolidge Worthington was born on November 27, 1920, in the now-defunct town of Bly, Oklahoma. He was named after President Calvin Coolidge, who had been elected Vice President of the United States three weeks earlier.

One of nine children, Worthington left school at 13 and worked as a water boy on a road crew for 15 cents an hour. He later joined the Civilian Conservation Corps at age 15.

=== World War II ===
At the start of World War II, Worthington enlisted in the United States Army Air Corps. He became an aerobatics champion at Goodfellow Field in San Angelo, Texas, and served as a Boeing B-17 Flying Fortress pilot in the 390th Bomb Group, flying 29 missions over Germany. He was awarded the Air Medal five times and the Distinguished Flying Cross, which was presented by General Jimmy Doolittle. He was discharged with the rank of captain.

He trained pilots who later became some of America's first astronauts.

== Business career ==
=== Early years ===
After leaving the Army, Worthington wanted to become a commercial pilot, but was unable to because he was not a college graduate. He sold his car for $500 to purchase a gas station in Corpus Christi, Texas, which was unsuccessful, but he sold it for what he had paid. He then began selling used cars in front of the post office in Corpus Christi, pitching to people as they picked up their mail. He moved to a dirt lot, where he made a $500 profit in one week by selling just three cars. He decided car sales would be his career.

=== Move to California ===
In 1949, Worthington relocated to Huntington Park, California, where he opened a Hudson dealership. He was an early adopter of television advertising, buying airtime for a three-hour live country music show on Los Angeles station KTLA every weekend. The program eventually became known as Cal's Corral. A regular performer was singer and lap steel guitar player Jenks "Tex" Carman.

When full-program sponsorships became unfeasible, Worthington switched to 30- and 60-second commercials and became a Ford dealer. By the 1970s, his advertisements saturated late-night movie broadcasts on four of Los Angeles's seven TV stations, airing from midnight to 6 a.m.

One of Worthington's rivals in the 1960s was Chick Lambert of Brand Motors Ford City, who often appeared in commercials with a German Shepherd named Storm. Storm was used as a prop: lounging on car hoods, sitting behind the wheel, or walking with Lambert. By the mid-1960s, Lambert was working at Ralph Williams Ford and began his commercials with, "Some people call this a commercial; I call it an invitation." Worthington responded by launching his "dog Spot" series of ads, which began with a roaring gorilla.

=== Expansion across the West Coast ===
The Worthington Dealership Group eventually expanded across much of the Southwest and West, operating 29 dealerships at its peak. Locations included Anchorage, Alaska; Phoenix, Arizona; Carlsbad, Claremont, Folsom, Long Beach, Sacramento, and South Gate, California; Reno, Nevada; Houston and Sugar Land, Texas; and Federal Way, Washington.

The group entered the Anchorage market in 1976, during the peak of the Trans-Alaska Pipeline System construction boom. Worthington purchased Friendly Ford, an existing dealership, from the Stepp family, which retained control of the city's Lincoln-Mercury franchise.

By the early 2000s, Worthington was among the first to adopt the "auto mall" concept. As of 2002, he also owned three shopping centers and an office tower, with reported gross revenues of $600 million annually.

The company's final dealership, located in Long Beach, California, was sold in February 2023.

=== "My Dog Spot" ads ===
From the 1960s through the 1990s, Worthington produced a series of unconventional television and radio ads loosely inspired by Earl "Madman" Muntz's "oddball" style.

The campaign began as a parody of Chick Lambert, a rival car dealer which always included Storm, a German Shepherd dog adopted from a pound. Each commercial opened with the line, "Here's Cal Worthington and his dog Spot!"—but "Spot" was never a dog but an exotic animal, such as a panther, elephant, bear, gorilla, killer whale, rhinoceros, skunk, carabao, hippopotamus, or a roller-skating chimpanzee. Even NFL player Deacon Jones once played "Spot" and sang the jingle. Worthington continued the "dog Spot" motif in his advertising for decades. Worthington sourced animals from local circuses and professional handlers in the Hollywood area. In other ads, Worthington stood on a flying airplane wing.

The ads aired heavily in the overnight hours and were accompanied by a jingle set to the tune of "If You're Happy and You Know It", with lyrics such as:

If you want a car or truck, go see Cal,
If you want to save a buck, go see Cal,
Give a new car to your wife, she will love you all your life,
Go see Cal, go see Cal, Go see Cal.

Worthington reportedly wrote the lyrics and recorded the jingle himself, with help from country-western singer Sammy Masters.

The commercial's popularity was such that many children believed Worthington's name was "Go See Cal." Some even misheard it as "Pussycow."

In some ads, he claimed he would perform stunts to make a sale—such as "eating a bug" or "I will stand upon my head 'till my ears are turning red!" According to the Television Bureau of Advertising, Worthington was "probably the best-known car dealer pitchman in television history."

== Personal life and death ==
Worthington was married and divorced four times. He had his last child in his early eighties. He never owned a personal car; instead, he drove used vehicles that were for sale at his dealerships. In a 2007 interview, Worthington stated that he disliked selling cars but "just kind of got trapped in it after the war. I didn't have the skills to do anything else. I just wanted to fly."

In May 2010, he appeared in a political advertisement for California State Assembly candidate Larry Miles. The commercial, a throwback to the "My Dog Spot" era, featured Worthington and "Spot" alongside the candidate. Worthington maintained both his pilot certificate and medical certification until two years before his death and was type-rated on the Learjet.

Worthington died on September 8, 2013, at the age of 92, at his ranch in Orland, California.

After his death, his grandson Nick Worthington became general manager of the Worthington automobile business, and is reported to have appeared in subsequent commercials. In 2023, the Worthington family sold its final dealership—located in Long Beach—to focus on commercial real estate and agriculture.

== In popular culture ==
Worthington appeared in film and on television portraying himself as a car dealer. In addition, his commercials have provided background in numerous films, and both the style of his commercials as well as his own personal appearance and manner of speech have been portrayed by other actors as well.

=== Films ===
- Worthington appeared as a car dealer in the 1973 film Save the Tiger.
- Worthington's ads were parodied in Marty Feldman's 1977 comedy feature film The Last Remake of Beau Geste.
- Worthington's ads played in the background in movies such as Into the Night (1985) and Down and Out in Beverly Hills (1986).
- In the 1984 movie Cannonball Run II, George Lindsey plays Cal, the uncle of drivers Mel Tillis and Tony Danza, who owns a used car dealership in Southern California and who is clearly modeled upon Cal Worthington. Cal owns a stretch limousine with an orangutan in a mock front seat. Cal lends the limo to his nephews for the coast-to-coast race, provided they look after the animal.
- In the 1993 movie Made in America, the character of Hal Jackson, played by Ted Danson is based on Cal Worthington. He is a California-based car dealer who stars in his own outrageous commercials, accompanied by large, out-of-control animals.
- In the 1998 film Brown's Requiem, based on James Ellroy's debut novel of the same name, the main character's boss Bud Myers is a Southern California car salesman famous for TV advertisements featuring the salesman and his dog. According to the book "James Ellroy: A Companion to the Mystery Fiction", James Ellroy, who was born in Los Angeles, based this character on Cal Worthington.

=== Television ===
- Worthington made numerous appearances over the years on The Tonight Show Starring Johnny Carson.
- In a 1972 episode of the animated television series Wait Till Your Father Gets Home, Stanley buys a clunker from a dishonest used car salesman based on Cal Worthington.
- In 1974, the television series Emergency! featured an episode in which the paramedic stars of the show rescue a car salesman who is trapped inside a car with a tiger during a commercial shoot.
