= The Legend of Sir Robert Charles Griggs =

Studio album by Sir Robert Charles Griggs
- Released: 1973
- Genre: Alternative country
- Label: Capitol

The Legend of Sir Robert Charles Griggs is the first album by Sir Robert Charles Griggs, former Nashville musician and now a resident of Hemet, California. The album, featuring original songs in a unique alt-country style, was released in 1973. Only released on vinyl, this album is somewhat of a rare find. A single of Fabulous Body and Smile was released concurrently on a 45 rpm record.

== Track listing ==
1. Fabulous Body and Smile (3:40)
2. West Coast Billy (1:45)
3. Cricket Convsersation Interlude (:12)
4. Singing for the Lord (2:43)
5. Moogie Woogie (:06)
6. Sing My Old Songs to Somebody New (1:38)
7. Vh1-V Hamp-Thieu (2:45)
8. Sideman Talks to God (5:12)
9. Keep It Country (2:32)
10. Birds (:10)
11. In L.A. (3:35)
12. Heartbeats and Death Gasp (:14)
13. Country Soul (4:38)
14. Freak-Out Moog (:06)
15. Uncle Ned (1:37)
16. Clint Texas (4:35)

== Album credits ==
Producer - Gary Paxton

Engineer - Scotty Moore

1. Kenny Malone - Drums
2. Martha McCrory - Strings
3. Weldon Myrick - Guitar (Steel)
4. Jeff Newman - Guitar (Steel)
5. Gary Paxton - Guitar
6. Marvin Shantry - Strings
7. Steven Maxwell Smith - Strings
8. Henry Strzelecki - Bass
9. Gary VanOsdale - Strings
10. Reggie Young - Guitar
11. Pete Drake - Guitar (Steel)
12. Bobby Wood - Piano
13. Martin Katahn - Strings
14. Sir Robert Charles Griggs - Main Performer
15. Brenton Banks - violin
16. Larry Butler - Piano
17. Jimmy Capps - Guitar
18. Charles Cochran - Piano, Arranger
19. Tommy Cogbill - Bass
20. Jim Colvard - Guitar
21. Shane Keister - Synthesizer
22. Sheldon Kurland - Strings
23. Mike Leech - Bass
24. Doug Kershaw - Fiddle, Concertina
