= Juliana Walanika =

- Also known as: Julian Walanika, Julia Walanika, Hawaii's Nightingale
- Born: September 21, 1846; Kingdom of Hawaii
- Died: September 6, 1931 (aged 84) California, United States
- Genres: Hawaiian
- Occupation: Vocalist
- Instrument: Vocals

Juliana Walanika (September 21, 1846 – September 6, 1931) was a court musician and favorite of King Kalākaua and Queen Liliuokalani, the last rulers of the Kingdom of Hawaii. She was known as the "Manoa Nightingale" or "Hawaii's Nightingale." She was also known as "Julia Walanika" or "Julian Walanika."

== Biography ==
She was born September 21, 1846. During the final quarters of the 19th-century, Walanika became one of the most popular singers of Hawaiian music. She was a favorite of King Kalākaua and Queen Liliuokalani, the last rulers of the Kingdom of Hawaii.

Known as the "Hawaiian Nightingale", she helped modernize Hawaiian music. Liliuokalani sent Walanika to different parts of the islands to perform modern versions of old meles and chants, thus creating the general style of the day.

Walanika moved to Southern California in later life and died there on September 6, 1931, at the age of 81. Her death was noted in Hawaii with the front page of the Hawaiian language newspaper Ka Nupepa Kuokoa dedicated to her life and legacy. Her ashes were buried in the Manoa Hawaiian Church yard.

Walanika's son July Paka is credited with introducing the Hawaiian steel guitar to the United States. She influenced later Hawaiian performers including the Hawaiian soprano-falsetto singer and composer Lena Machado. Historian George Kanahele described how Machado sang with the "Hawaiian style reminiscent of Nani Alapai, Juliana Walanika, and Helen Desha Beamer." Lorrin A. Thurston, a man pivotal in the Overthrow of the Kingdom of Hawaii in 1893, noted that Walanika "was the first of the modern Hawaiian singers" who made the song "Poli-anu-anu" or "Cold Bosom" well known.

== Bibliography ==
- Kanahele, George S. (1979). Hawaiian Music and Musicians: An Illustrated History. University Press of Hawaii. ISBN 978-0-8248-0578-4. OCLC 903648649.
- Peterson, Barbara Bennett, ed. (1984). Notable Women of Hawaii. Honolulu: University of Hawaii Press. ISBN 978-0-8248-0820-4. OCLC 11030010.
- Ruymar, Lorene (1996). The Hawaiian Steel Guitar and Its Great Hawaiian Musicians. Anaheim Hills, CA: Centerstream Publications. ISBN 978-1-57424-021-4. OCLC 36389858.
