= Town Hall Party =

American radio program

Town Hall Party is an American country music and rockabilly entertainment program originating in Southern California. It was initially broadcast on radio in 1951 and then on television beginning in 1953.

The first radio broadcast was in Autumn 1951 by stations KXLA-AM in Pasadena, California, and KFI-AM in Los Angeles.

On television, the show was broadcast by KTTV-TV in Los Angeles.

== Founding and synopsis ==
Promoter William B. Wagnon, Jr., had been booking such acts as Bob Wills and His Texas Playboys in ballrooms between Bakersfield and Sacramento for several years when he decided to extend his operations to Los Angeles. Burt "Foreman" Phillips, himself a bandleader had been promoting country and Western barn dance programs at the old Town Hall building, situated at 400 South Long Beach Boulevard in Compton, near Long Beach. Wagnon acquired Phillips' lease and commenced promoting a combined dance-and-show, featuring any and all country & western recording artists working in the area and available on Saturday nights. An estimated 3,000 patrons could be accommodated in the Town Hall Ballroom.

Wagnon instructed the performers to play only music which could be danced to, and to keep individual songs short and plentiful, in order to satisfy everyone's tastes.

== NBC radio broadcasts ==
A Friday night radio version of Town Hall Party was heard on KXLA, and Wagnon approached KFI with a proposal for a Saturday night broadcast. The latter was carried by portions of the NBC Radio network. Country singer Wesley Tuttle was hired as director/musical director of the series, and Johnny Bond was contracted to write the scripts for the KFI/NBC series. The cast featured Tex Ritter, Johnny Bond, Buddy Dooly, Wesley Tuttle, Tex Williams, Roy Klein, Joe Maphis, Rose Lee Maphis, Jenks "Tex" Carman, Eddie Kirk, Jim Pruitt, Merle Travis, Fiddlin' Kate (Margie Warren), Freddie Hart, Mary Jane Johnson, Les "Carrot-Top" Anderson, Pee Wee Adams, Shirley Adams, comedian Texas Tiny, and other prominent country entertainers. TV and radio announcer Jay Stewart, who had worked with Bond on an earlier West Coast country & western show, Hollywood Barn Dance, was hired as master of ceremonies.

== Television program ==
From 10:00 p.m. to 1:00 a.m. PT on Saturday nights, Los Angeles television station KTTV carried the live Town Hall Party series. By September 1953 the show was "a regional NBC TV'er," and "the longest c.&w. West Coast TV'er, with net plans in the works. The Armed Forces Television Service made 16mm kinescopes of the shows and broadcast them on stations throughout the world, from Greenland to Saudi Arabia to the Canal Zone. As the show expanded, new talent joined the cast - with Lefty Frizzell, Skeets McDonald, Dortha Wright, and The Collins Kids being among the most popular.

Guest stars were plentiful, with an appearance by Gene Autry breaking all attendance records during a 1954 performance. Other notable guest stars included Johnny Cash, Carl Perkins, Gene Vincent, Eddie Dean, Smiley Burnette, Jimmy Wakely, Eddie Cochran, Sons of the Pioneers and Jim Reeves.

The 10-piece Town Hall Party band featured Joe Maphis, Merle Travis, steel guitarist Marian Hall, Billy Hill and Fiddlin' Kate on violins, PeeWee Adams on drums, Jimmy Pruitt on piano, and other musicians who created a Town Hall Party sound also heard on many country sessions produced by Columbia Records in Hollywood in the 1950s.

Wagnon's series continued to expand in the 1950s. Billed as Town Hall Ranch Party, Sunday afternoon and holiday performances were held outdoors at Sierra Creek Park in the Santa Monica Mountains beginning in the summer of 1955. A daily version began airing on another Los Angeles television station. Then, in 1957, Wagnon arranged with Screen Gems to film a series of 39 half-hour television shows featuring the Town Hall Party cast. A close friend of Art Linkletter, Wagnon had named his series after Linkletter's popular radio/television program, House Party. He opted to capitalize on the TV Westerns craze of 1957 by calling the syndicated series, Ranch Party. While many traditional country and Western musicians had been mainstays of the radio and television cast for years, the series readily embraced rock ´n roll and enthusiastically presented singers from the new genre. Eddie Cochran performed on February 7, 1959. Carl Perkins and his combo were brought in to film guest spots on the Screen Gems series, and The Collins Kids were given co-star billing with host Tex Ritter. Traditional country entertainers, singing cowboys, and rock singers never shared the spotlight in a more harmonious manner than on the Town Hall Party and syndicated Ranch Party shows.

== 1958 to 1961 ==
Columbia Records released a Town Hall Party LP album in 1958, featuring many of the regular cast members of the series. That same year, however, brought changes to the program. NBC radio had discontinued carrying the Saturday night shows, and rising union scale rates made it impossible for Wagnon to keep the huge cast of recording artists on the Compton stage week after week. The band was made smaller and many regular cast members departed in 1958. Billy Mize and Cliff Crofford, talented vocalists/instrumentalists/composers, joined the much smaller cast as band members and soloists.

The Brooklyn Dodgers baseball team began playing in Los Angeles in April 1958, drawing many Town Hall patrons to the nearby Coliseum. In 1959, the new Los Angeles Dodgers won the World Series.

In late December 1958 the newly opened Showboat Hotel in Las Vegas began to put on Town Hall Party shows featuring Tex Ritter, The Collins Kids, and Town Hall regulars, thus drawing them away from the KTTV Saturday night telecasts.

Competition for television viewers was more intense as the new decade began, and KTTV gave notice that Town Hall Party was to be dropped in December, 1960. The final performance at the Compton Town Hall was on January 14, 1961. Other live country and Western music shows were seen on California television at various points in the 1960s, but none featured the large cast of recording artists which Wagnon assembled in the 1950s, glimpses of which may be seen today on films of the syndicated Ranch Party series and on DVD releases of the surviving kinescopes of Town Hall Party.

== Performers ==
- PeeWee Adams
- Dick D'Agostin
- Les "Carrot-Top" Anderson
- Johnny Bond
- Martha Carson
- Jenks "Tex" Carman
- Johnny Cash (Nov. 58, Aug 59)
- Jim Reeves
- Bobby Charles
- Patsy Cline
- Eddie Cochran
- Alvis Coker
- Shirley Collie
- The Collins Kids
- Cliff Crofford
- Ted Daffan
- Dick Dale
- Eddie Dean
- Tommy Duncan
- Fiddlin' Kate
- Lefty Frizzell
- Marian Hall
- Freddie Hart
- Bobby Helms
- Cousin Herb Henson
- Billy Hill
- Hoosier Hot Shots
- Wanda Jackson
- Myrna Jay
- Mary Jane Johnson
- Jerry Lee Lewis
- Bob Luman
- Leon McAuliffe
- Skeets McDonald
- Joe Maphis
- Rose Lee Maphis
- Billy Mize
- Mary Lou Nell
- Carl Perkins
- Wayne Raney
- Rangers Quartet
- Tex Ritter
- Marty Robbins
- Tommy Sands
- Bonnie Sloan
- Tom Tall
- Dub Taylor
- Gordon Terry
- Merle Travis
- Marilyn Tuttle
- Wesley Tuttle
- Gene Vincent (Oct. 58, July 59, Nov. 59)
- Slim Willet
- Mac Wiseman
- Dortha Wright
- George Jones
- Charlie Williams
- Hank Snow
- Gene Vincent
