= Michael Nakasone =

Hawaiian band director

Michael D. Nakasone is a band director. Born in Hawaii, he led the Hawaii Youth Symphony, the Pearl City High School (Hawaii) Band, the Royal Hawaiian Band, the Punahou School Wind Ensemble, and the Nāulu Winds of the University of Hawaiʻi–West Oʻahu.

== Early life ==
Nakasone was raised in Hilo and enrolled in several public schools in the vicinity, until graduating from Hilo High School. He was a keyboard player for a local rock band during the 1960s. At the University of Hawaii at Manoa, he earned his bachelor's and master's degrees in music education.

== Career ==
In 1968, Nakasone started his career as a band director at the Wahiawa Intermediate School. He then moved to Mililani High School in 1973 and then taught at the Pearl City High School in 1977. In 1992, he was named director of the PCHS Performing Arts Learning Center. He contributed much to the construction of the Pearl City Cultural Arts Center. Under Nakasone's direction, the Pearl City Marching Band has performed in the Aloha Festivals Parade (Hawaii), Macy's Thanksgiving Day Parade, the Tournament of Roses Parade, the Ginza Parade (Tokyo), Philadelphia Thanksgiving Day Parade, as well as several NFL Pro Bowl halftime shows.

In 1990, Nakasone brought the Pearl City High School Symphonic Winds to perform at the prestigious Midwest Clinic International Band and Orchestra Conference becoming the first ever band from Hawaiʻi to perform there.

In 2004, Nakasone retired from his position as the band director of the Pearl City Marching Band and 37 years with the Hawaii DOE to become the band director of the Royal Hawaiian Band. He served as a conductor with the Royal Hawaiian Band until 2010.

In June 2012, Nakasone became the band director at Punahou School; in 2016 he retired.

He later taught as a substitute for many schools such as Campbell and Pearl City before becoming a co-director of the University of Hawaii-West Oahu University Band with Dr. Chadwick Kamei.

In 2022, Pearl City High School renamed the Pearl City Cultural Arts Center after Nakasone in a ceremony featuring a 100-member band of Nakasone's current and former students. The band featured notable conductors such as Clarke Bright, Joseph Hermann, Dr. Terry Austin, and Robert W. Smith. The event was attended by many local current and former politicians including then-Governor David Ige; former Governors Ben Cayetano and John Waiheʻe; state senators and representatives; and HIDOE officials.

in December 2024, Nakasone took the Nāulu Winds of the University of Hawaiʻi–West Oʻahu to the Midwest Clinic International Band and Orchestra Conference becoming the first ever community band from Hawaiʻi to perform at the Midwest Clinic.

== Honours & Recognition ==
- John Philip Sousa Foundation's Sudler Flag of Honor (1991)
- Band World Legion of Honor 10 Best Band Directors in the Nation (1995)
- Hawaiʻi Department of Education's Teacher of the Year (1996)
- Hawaiʻi Music Award Lifetime Achievement Award (1998)
- Governor’s Fine Arts Award (2005)
- High School Band Directors National Association Hall of Fame inductee (2012)
- National Band Association Hall of Fame of Distinguished Conductors inductee (2020)
