= Sir Robert Charles Griggs =

American singer-songwriter

Sir Robert Charles Griggs, a.k.a. Bobby Charles (born 1936), is a retired country and jazz musician living in Hemet, California.

== History ==
He began his career in the 1950s as a performer on the country music television show, Town Hall Party. Appearing as Bobby Charles, he was singing and doing vocal imitations of a dozen or so other personalities in 1955, the same year he graduated from Compton High School. Other appearances included Frank and Norma's Big Wheel Club in Santa Ana in 1958 where he played Western, Pop, Rhythm & Blues, and, in November, he was billed as the star of Country America, a TV show telecast on Los Angeles's KABC. In 1964, he began making appearances with the Golden West Orchestra at the Golden West Ballroom in Norwalk, California.

Later, his career took him to Nashville where he worked in recording studios as a sideman. In 1973, he recorded his first solo album, The Legend of Sir Robert Charles Griggs. The album, while not a big seller and now out of print, has achieved an underground cult status. Produced by Gary Paxton, it is an innovative showcase of experimental alt-country music, with all songs written by Griggs himself. Moog synthesizers and sound effects on some tracks set this album apart from the rest, as being ahead of its time. Bob Claypool of The Houston Post described it as an "interesting record", noting its humor and satirical takes on traditional country subject matter and its unusual style.

In 1968, Joe Williams recorded Griggs' song Young Man on the Way Up on the album Something Old, New, and Blue for Solid State Records, and in 1973, Dick Curless recorded Country Soul on the album "The Last Blues Song".

Griggs became disillusioned with the recording industry, dropping out of the scene altogether. He now lives in Hemet, California, reportedly working as a custodian at a local school.

In 2008, his second album In to Jazz was produced and released by Griggs and bassist Jim DeJulio. "An appealing relaxed, lived-in sound and approach," according to critic Rob Lester.

In 2021, his song "Fabulous Body and Smile" was included in Choctaw Ridge: New Fables of the American South 1968-1973, a compilation released by Ace records and curated by musician and writer Bob Stanley. An "excellent" album, according to the liner notes written by Stanley and music scholar Martin Green.
