= George Paele Mossman =

Hawaiian cultural figure (1891–1955)

George Paele Mossman, 1954

George Paele Mossman (March 28, 1891 – February 6, 1955) was a Honolulu businessman of Hawaiian ancestry, who became successful as a cultural entrepreneur, musician and ukulele maker. He was born in the Kingdom of Hawaii to Thomas and Nahua Kealaikahiki Mossman in the Pauoa Valley on the island of Oahu. After the death of his wife Rebecca Kainapau, he married Emma Keliilalanikulani Lewis. He had 7 children resulting from the two marriages: George R., Thomas W., Robert, Rebecca Pualani, Kaahikipiilani T., Leilani R. and Joseph Kekaulike. Mossman was of the Mormon faith, and a Sunday School superintendent of the Church of Jesus Christ of Latter-day Saints in Hawaii.

== Early life ==
By the time he was 7 years old, his homeland had been annexed by the United States, becoming the Territory of Hawaii. After annexation, the territory began a process of a cultural assimilation. Mossman saw his old culture fading away, and grew concerned that one day it would be lost forever. He worked at various manual labor professions, eventually putting his efforts towards making ukuleles.

== Perpetuation of Hawaiian culture ==
He opened Bell Tone Studio of Music in 1927, and hired "Hawaii's Songbird" Lena Machado as the store's Hawaiian dance and singing instructor. In 1929, at the same address as his Bell Tone Studio, Mossman opened Hale Hoonaauao Hawaii, or "Hawaiian House of Learning" with an initial staff of four instructors to perpetuate the Hawaiian language and arts. Eventually, the school put together a traveling entertainment troupe that toured the islands.

Mossman began organizing Hawaiian-language glee clubs in 1928 to preserve the culture. His first effort was instructing a class of 50–60 youths at President William McKinley High School. The George Mossman Players at McKinley High School presented reenactments of significant moments in Hawaii's history, such as their presentation of Christian convert High Chiefess Kapiʻolani breaking the taboos. The Honolulu Star-Bulletin described the production as ".. the dynamic enthusiasm of George Mossman for his favorite hobby – the preservation of the early culture of the Hawaiians in a living form."

== Lalani Hawaiian Village ==
George and his wife Emma Keliilalanikulani Lewis created the Mossman Foundation to continue the work of preserving the culture of the Hawaiian people. What Mossman is most remembered for in Hawaii is the 1932 creation of Lalani Hawaiian Village, a living history tourist attraction adjacent to their family home, at the corner of Kalakaua and Paoakalani Avenues. Mossman brought in Hawaiian crafts instructors, chanter Kuluwaimaka of the royal court of Kalākaua, Hawaiian singers and hula dancers.

Opening ceremonies on May 12, 1932, were led by Territorial Governor Wallace Rider Farrington. The event was bolstered by congratulatory messages from United States Secretary of the Interior Ray Lyman Wilbur and Victor S. K. Houston, territorial delegate to the United States House of Representatives, and the presence of representatives from the United States military forces. Old-style music and entertainment was presented, as well as speeches by musician Johnny Noble and athlete Duke Kahanamoku. The ceremonies were facilitated by the "Ad Club", a publicity organization affiliated with the local Chamber of Commerce.

According to news coverage at the opening, rather than hotels and tourists shops, what existed in Waikiki in that era were run-down shacks, remnants of the monarchy era. Lalani Hawaiian Village lasted for two decades, and has been acknowledged as the forerunner of the Waikiki tourism boom that happened after the Hawaii Admission Act of 1959 made it the 50th state. The Waikiki Beach Marriott Resort and Spa currently occupies that corner of real estate.

== Death ==
George P. Mossman died February 9, 1955, and the Honolulu Star-Bulletin recognized his efforts to promote and preserve Hawaii's culture. His wife Emma died November 11, 1955.

The Mossman ventures were all family operations. His daughter Pualani Mossman Avon became famous for her image appearing in numerous advertising campaigns for Hawaii. She became the poster girl for Matson cruise ship advertisements.

== Bibliography ==
- Judd, Henry P.; Hilleary, Perry Edward (1954). Men and women of Hawaii, 1954; a biographical encyclopedia of persons of notable achievement, an historical account of the peoples who have distinguished themselves through personal success and through public service. Honolulu, HI: Honolulu Business Consultants – via HathiTrust.
