= Pearl City High School (Hawaii) =

Public high school in Pearl City, Hawaii, United States

Coordinates: 21.414645°N 157.953107°W

Location
- 2100 Hookiekie Street; Pearl City, Hawaii 96782; United States

Information
- Type: Public, co-educational
- Motto: "Excellence with Honor"
- Established: 1971
- School district: Hawaii Department of Education
- Principal: Garrett Arakawa
- Faculty: 97.00 (FTE)
- Grades: 9–12
- Enrollment: 1,418 (2023-2024)
- Student to teacher ratio: 14.62
- Campus: Suburban
- Colors: Purple and white
- Athletics: Oahu Interscholastic Association
- Mascot: Charger
- Accreditation: Western Association of Schools and Colleges (WASC), National Academy Career Coalition (NCAC)
- Newspaper: The Messenger
- Yearbook: Hali'a Aloha
- Military: United States Air Force Auxiliary (CAP)
- Website: pchs.k12.hi.us/

Pearl City High School is a public, co-ed comprehensive high school located in Pearl City, Hawaii which serves grades 9–12. Its mascot is the Charger and is operated by the Hawaii State Department of Education (HIDOE) in the Leeward Complex. (Note: The HIDOE operates as a single school system; Schools within the HIDOE are divided into subdistricts called "complexes".) The campus is located at 2100 Hookekie Street on the slopes of the Koʻolau Mountain Range overlooking Pearl Harbor. Additionally, it campus features the sculptures Moon Beyond the Fence by Satoru Abe and Kua Kua Lua by Donald M. Page.

The school is accredited by the Western Associations of Schools and Colleges (WASC) every six years, having its most recent accreditation in 2019. The school utilizes career academy models based on Smaller Learning Communities which have been reviewed by the National Academy Career Coalition (NCAC).

As of 2023–2024, the school offers a total of 1,418 students, with a faculty of 97.00 and a student teacher ratio of 14.62. The school offers a variety of extracurricular activities, including FIRST Robotics, a music program, and sports. Its newspaper is The Messenger, its yearbook is Hail'a Aloha, and its military is associated with the United States Air Force Auxiliary.

== History ==
The school broke ground in May 1970, with then-Hawaii governor John A. Burns releasing $2.8 million to the Hawaii State Department of Education (HIDOE) for the development of the school in May 1971. The school opened its doors in September 1971, and initially featured only two buildings. During its first year, it served only 9th graders, with 10th to 12th grades added the following year

Over the years, the campus expanded to include additional buildings. The school's charger mascot and colors were chosen by the Class of 1974, which was the first graduating class; Purple and white were chosen as school colors, as they were used by community teams.

In 1977, a fire caused an estimated $60,000 in damage to the school. In 2016, the school's athletic field and track were resurfaced with artificial turf. Construction began in 2021 on improvements to the baseball facilities and the addition of a softball stadium.

In 2022, the school's auditorium was renamed the Michael D. Nakasone Performing Arts Center in after former band teacher Michael D. Nakasone. The center was formerly known as the Pearl City Cultural Center.

In 2025, former Seattle Seahawks quarterback Michael Bennett hosted a flag football clinic for students on the school's track.

== School structure ==
=== Enrollment and demographics ===
As of the 2023–2024 school year, the school had an enrollment of 1,418 students. Of this population, 304 students were considered to be two or more races, 253 were considered to be Pacific Islander, 54 were considered White, 231 were considered Hispanic, 561 were considered Asian, and two were considered to be American Indian or Alaska Native. 306 students were considered to be eligible for free lunch and 87 were considered eligible for reduced-price lunch.

== Academics ==
Per the Hawaii State Department of Education (HIDOE), the school uses Hawaii Common Core standards. As of the 2023–2024 school year, the school is ranked 12th the state of Hawaii and 4,034th nationally on the U.S. News & World Report. In 2016, the school earned a bronze medal on their national ranking. The school is accredited by the Western Association of Schools and Colleges (WASC) every six years; As of 2025, the school's last accreditation was in 2019.

=== Career academies ===
The school uses a career academy structure to provide individualized instruction to students. There are a total of three academies, which specialize in culinary arts, health sciences and leadership, international business and design, and technology and design respectively. Each academy contains pathways for individualized career paths based on Career and Technical Education and have all received Academy Model Status by the National Academy Career Coalition (NCAC).

=== Graduation requirements ===
Per the Board of Education, the school requires four credits in English, four credits in social studies, three credits in mathematics, three credits in science, two credits in either world language, fine arts, or Career Technical Education, one credit in physical education, half a credit in health, and half a credit for the Personal Transition Plan (PTP), for a total of 24 credits.

== Extracurricular activities ==
The school offers extracurricular programs including robotics, music, JROTC and athletics. Its robotics program participates in FIRST Robotics and VEX Robotics. In 2023, its VEX Robotics team qualified for the VEX World Championship.

=== Charger Band ===
The Charger Marching Band has had variety of performances, including the 2000 and 2006 Tournament of Roses parade in Pasadena, California, the Hamamatsu Festival in Hamamatsu, Japan and the 2011 London's New Year's Day Parade in London, England.

As part of the HIDOE Learning Center program, the school has a music learning center created specifically to increase and broaden the abilities of students who are interested in music. The program offers a variety of programs, including a jazz band, concert bands, and a marching band.

=== Athletics ===
Pearl City competes in the Oahu Interscholastic Association (OIA). Its sports programs include: air riflery, boys' baseball, basketball, bowling, canoe paddling, cross country, girls' flag football, football, golf, judo, soccer, girls' softball, soft tennis, swimming, tennis, track and field, volleyball, girls' water polo, and wrestling.

The school's Hawaii High School Athletic Association state championships include:

- Girls' soccer: 1990, 1991, 1993, 1997, and 2016 (Division I).
- Boys' soccer: 1999.
- Boys' judo: 2003, 2004, 2005, 2007, 2008, 2025, and 2026.
- Girls' judo: 2005, 2008, 2012, 2013, 2014, 2017, and 2025.
- Boys' bowling: 1983, 1984, 1998, 2002, 2009, 2011, 2012, 2014, 2015, 2016, 2017, and 2025.
- Girls' bowling: 1986, 1996, 1998, 2001, 2002, 2003, 2012, 2013, 2014, 2015, 2016, 2018, 2024, 2025, and 2026.
- Girls' air riflery: 2014, 2016, 2023, 2024, and 2025.
- Boys' track and field: 2004.
- Boys' wrestling: 2014.
- Girls' wrestling: 2013.
- Boys' volleyball: 2022 (Division II).
- Baseball: 2011 (Division I).
- Softball: 1980, 1984, 1992, and 2006 (Division I).

== Campus ==
The school is located at 2100 Hookiekie Street in Pearl City. The campus is located on the slopes of the Koʻolau Mountain Range and directly overlooks Pearl Harbor. Additionally, it also contains the sculptures Moon Beyond the Fence by Satoru Abe and Kua Kua Lua by Donald M. Page.

== Notable staff ==
- Michael D. Nakasone, former band teacher

== Notable alumni ==
Listed alphabetically by last name (year of graduation):

- Kevin Asano, 1988 Olympic Silver Medalist in Judo, San Jose State University and Hawaii Sports Hall of Fame inductee
- Sunshine Fontes (2019), professional soccer player
- David Ige (1975), 8th Governor of Hawaii (2014–2022)
- Kai Kamaka III, mixed martial artist
- Jason Scott Lee, actor and martial artist
- Dave Lefotu, former professional football player
- Blake Oshiro, former state representative (2001–2011)
- Mark Takai (1985), former member of the United States House of Representatives for Hawaii's 1st district (2015–2016)
- Jordan Ta'amu (2015), former starting quarterback for the Ole Miss Rebels and the St. Louis BattleHawks, former quarterback for the Kansas City Chiefs
- Zion Tupuola-Fetui, professional football lineman
