= Walter Kolomoku =

Hawaiian steel guitar musician, actor, and recording artist

Walter K. Kolomoku
- Born: Walter Keaumakalani Kolomoku; February 14, 1889; Honolulu, Oahu, Hawaiian Kingdom
- Died: May 6, 1930 (aged 41) Manhattan, New York, New York
- Occupations: Musician, actor, and recording artist
- Instrument: Steel guitar
- Label: Victor Records
- Spouse: Anita Goldie Segal

Walter Keaumakalani Kolomoku (February 14, 1889 – May 6, 1930) was a Hawaiian musician, actor, and recording artist. He has a cameo in D. W. Griffith's film The Idol Dancer. He recorded Southern Melodies Waltz No. 1 on Victor Records. He played the steel guitar.

His work includes recorded performances as part of the Hawaiian Quintette. He toured with Ernest Kaʻai. He left Honolulu and lived in New York for 20 years. He conducted the Hawaiian Conservatory of Music.

Kolomuku and William Smith's rendition of "Aloha Oe."

He recorded several songs on Victor records. He taught guitar and ukulele via correspondence classes. Musician Bob Dunn took the steel guitar courses as a young man.

The Idol Dancer

Kolomoku recorded the album Southern Melodies in 1928 covering Southern classics on the steel guitar.

He married and had a son.

== Discography ==
- "Aloha Oe" (1911) by Queen Liliʻuokalani circa 1878, Edison Blue Amberola Cylinder
- "Kaua i ka huahuai" - Hawaiian War Chant (April 18, 1913) Victor 65339 Camden, New Jersey" as part of the Hawaiian Quintette
- "Wailana" (1913), as part of the Hawaiian Quintette
- Southern Melodies (1928)
