= Rose Lee Maphis =

American musician (1922–2021)

- Born: Doris Helen Schetrompf; December 29, 1922; Baltimore, Maryland, US
- Died: October 26, 2021 (aged 98); Nashville, Tennessee, US
- Occupation: Musician
- Spouse: Joe Maphis (m. 1953; died 1986)
- Children: 3
- Musical career
- Genre: Country
- Instruments: Vocals; guitar

Rose Lee Maphis (born Doris Helen Schetrompf; December 29, 1922 – October 26, 2021) was an American country singer and musician.

She performed as a harmony singer and rhythm guitarist as a duo with her husband Joe Maphis. They were pioneers of the Bakersfield sound that developed in the mid-1950s. They appeared on numerous radio and television programs, including as cast members of Town Hall Party.

== Early life ==
Maphis (pronounced "MAY-fiss") was born Doris Helen Schetrompf on December 29, 1922, in Baltimore, Maryland, to Margaret Helen (Schriever) and Stanley Schetrompf. She grew up on a farm in Hagerstown where her family produced eggs and butter, sold Christmas trees and rented out cabins near the river that ran though their property. As a child, Maphis listened to the Grand Ole Opry. Rose attended business college after graduating high school in 1941.

== Career ==
Her father hosted a picnic for WJEJ radio, introducing the station to his daughter who sang and played guitar. The station offered her a 15-minute spot on its Saturday night program.

Before performing with her husband, Maphis was featured in a female quartet, a western group called The Saddle Sweethearts, who often played the same bill as Gene Autry and Roy Acuff. After performing with Saddle Sweethearts, she worked briefly for her father as a bookkeeper. She learned that Mother Maybelle and The Carter Sisters were leaving the Old Dominion Barn Dance and were looking for singers. She met her future husband Joe there. She and her husband would later be called "Mr. and Mrs. Country Music".

A producer suggested the name "Rose of the Mountains" for her on her debut performance on a Hagerstown radio station, as she had a rose in her hair and was singing "Carry Me Back to the Mountains".

Around the 1950s, Maphis and her husband were cast members of the television show Town Hall Party on KTTV in Los Angeles.

The Maphises were best known for the self-penned honky-tonk standard "Dim Lights, Thick Smoke (And Loud, Loud Music)", which was originally recorded by Flatt and Scruggs.

== Post-entertainment career ==
After the death of her husband, she worked as a seamstress at Opryland theme park designing for such stars as Brenda Lee and Barbara Mandrell.

In her later years, and no longer well known as a major star, she worked voluntarily as a greeter at the Country Music Hall of Fame and Museum, sharing stories about the genre's legends. Maphis's guitar is on display, next to that of her husband's double-neck Mosrite and sheet music for their recording "Dim Lights", in a montage called The Bakersfield Exhibit.

Rose's last public appearance was on August 7, 2021, in Cumberland, Maryland for a 100th birthday celebration for her late husband.

She died of kidney failure on October 26, 2021, in Nashville, Tennessee, at age 98. She had 3 children, Lorrie, Dale, and Jody. Jody Maphis is also a musician, who has performed with such stars as Johnny Cash.

== Discography ==
=== Singles ===
==== Columbia Records ====
- 1955: "Honky Tonk Down Town / The Parting of the Way"
- 1955 "I'm Willin' To Try / Let's Pull Together"
- 1959: "Fire On the Strings / I Love You Deeply" (A-side by Joe Maphis)

==== Mosrite Records ====
- 1966: "Send Me Your Love A.P.O. / Write Him A Letter"
- 1967: "Tunin' Up For The Blues / A Lifetime of Love"
- 1967: "Country Girl Courtship / Pickin' and Guitin'"

==== Starday Records ====
- 1964: "Hoot'n Annie / Remember I'm Just As Close As the Phone"
- 1965: "Hot Time in Nashville / I've Got To Take You Home"
- 1965: "Your Little Black Book / Don't Pass Me By"
- 1966: "Ridin' Down Ole 99 / Turn On The Bright Lights"

==== Chart Records ====
- 1969: "Gee Aren't We Lucky / Guitar Happy"
- 1970: "Run That By Me One More Time / I Don't Care"
- 1971: "Slippin', Pickin', Fiddlin' / If I'm Gonna Have Your Lovin'"

=== Albums ===
- 1961: Rose Lee Maphis
- 1962: Rose Lee & Joe Maphis (with Joe Maphis and the Blue Ridge Mountain Boys)
- 1964: Mr. and Mrs. Country Music (with Joe Maphis)
- 1964: Hootenanny Star
- 1978: Dim Lights, Thick Smoke (with Joe Maphis)
- 1979: Boogie Woogie Flattop Guitar Pickin' Man (with Joe Maphis)
- 1980: Honky Tonk Cowboy (with Joe Maphis)

== Sources ==
- Wolfe, Charles K.; Akenson, James Edward, eds. (2003). The Women of Country Music: A Reader. University Press of Kentucky. OCLC 900344872.
