= Joe Maphis =

American country music guitarist (1921–1986)

- Born: Otis Wilson Maphis; May 12, 1921; Suffolk, Virginia, U.S.
- Died: June 27, 1986 (aged 65) Nashville, Tennessee, U.S.
- Genres: Country
- Instrument: Guitar
- Label: Columbia

Otis Wilson "Joe" Maphis (/ˈmeɪfɪs/ MAY-fis; May 12, 1921 – June 27, 1986), was an American country music guitarist. He married singer Rose Lee Maphis in 1953 and they performed together.

One of the flashiest country guitarists of the 1950s and 1960s, Maphis was known as "The King of the Strings".

== Biography ==
=== Early life ===
Maphis was born in Suffolk, Virginia, United States. His family moved to Cumberland, Maryland, in 1926 when his father Robert Maphis landed a job with the B&O Railroad. Joe Maphis's first band was called the Maryland Rail Splitters. He also played in the local (Cumberland) Foggy Mountain Boys as well as The Sonnateers before Maphis hit the road in 1939. He played across Virginia until he became a regular featured performer on the "Old Dominion Barn Dance," broadcast live on radio WRVA-AM and aired in 38 states.

In 1944, Maphis went into the U.S. Army. His musical skills landed him a gig entertaining the troops around the world. Maphis was discharged from the Army in 1946. On his return to the states, he began playing on WLS radio in Chicago. In the late 1940s he returned to Richmond, Virginia and the Old Dominion Barn Dance until the early 1950s. During this period Maphis met many country music stars of the day who played the same circuit, including Merle Travis. While in Virginia, he also met the musically talented Rose Lee (Doris) Schetrompf, his future wife. Maphis and Schetrompf, of Clear Spring, Maryland, were married in 1953. A talented vocalist and rhythm guitarist, Rose performed with Joe onstage throughout the remainder of their career.

=== Recording career ===
Maphis' recording career took off in 1951 when he was invited to Los Angeles by Merle Travis and country music entertainer Johnny Bond. He made two LPs with Travis, recorded for countless country and pop stars and worked on many themes for television programs and movie soundtracks. Maphis recorded for Columbia Records and other labels. Later based in Bakersfield, California, he rose to prominence with his own hits such as "Dim Lights, Thick Smoke (And Loud, Loud Music)", as well as playing with acts like Johnny Burnette, Doyle Holly, The Collins Kids, Wanda Jackson, Rose Maddox and Ricky Nelson. "Dim Lights" has become a honky-tonk standard with numerous artists recording versions of the tune including Flatt and Scruggs, Vern Gosdin, Daryle Singletary and Dwight Yoakam. He played on Ricky Nelson's first Imperial Records hits "Stood Up (song)", "Waitin In School", and "Be-Bop Baby before James Burton assumed lead guitar duties.

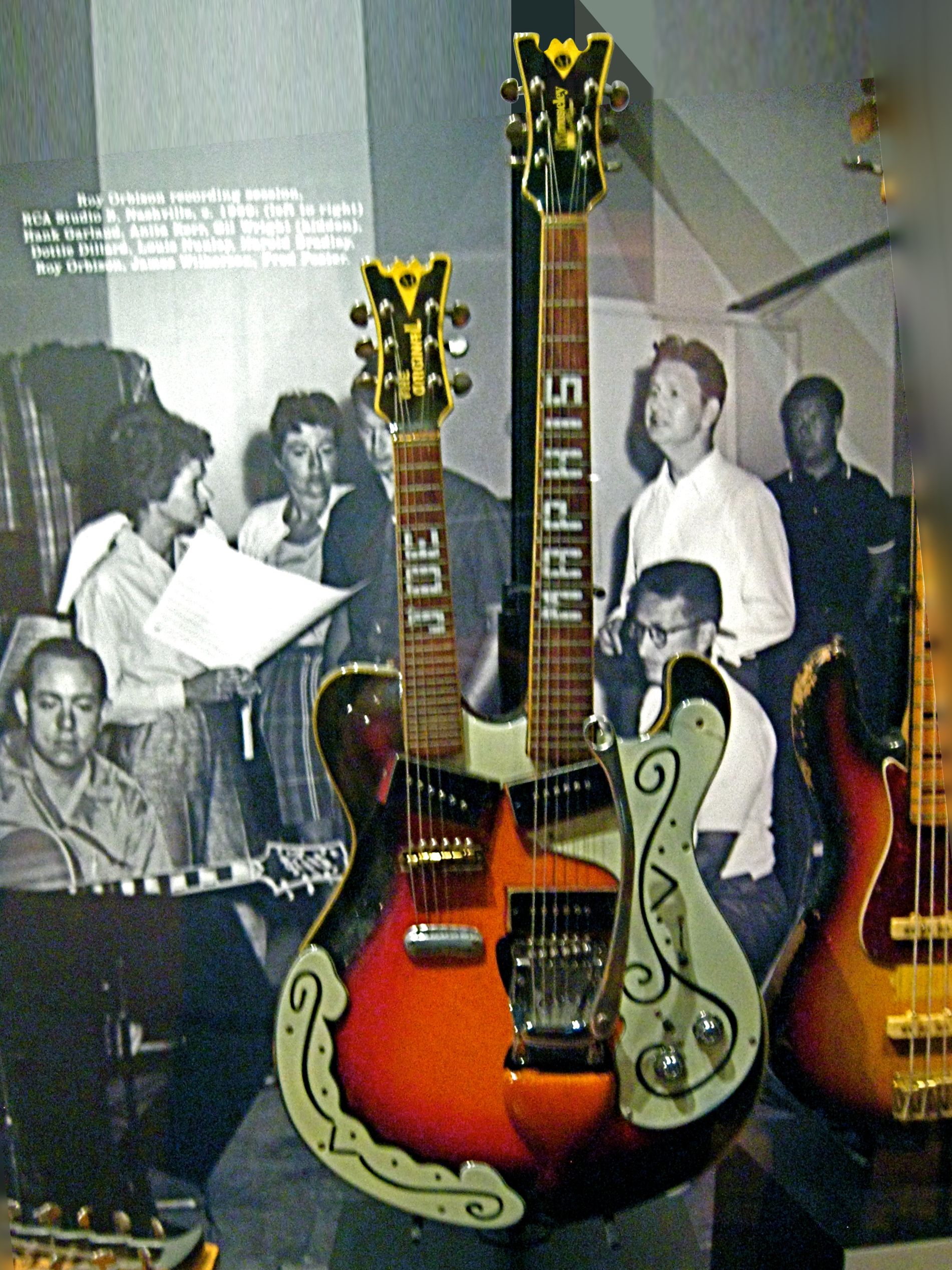
His double-neck Mosrite guitar

Maphis was a band member and featured soloist on the Town Hall Party radio (and later television) program broadcast throughout the 1950s. Emanating from the Los Angeles area, Maphis was a regular on the program which included many recording stars of the day including Tex Ritter, Johnny Cash, Gene Autry, Bob Wills and the Texas Playboys and many others. "Town Hall Party," was later syndicated under the name "Ranch Party," and seen in most parts of the country. He was also a regular guest on the Jimmy Dean television show in the 1960s. The duo performed on the PBS television broadcast "Austin City Limits," in 1984 as part of the programs, "Legends Series." Fellow music industry insiders and fans had begun calling them "Mr. and Mrs. Country Music."

=== Death ===
Maphis was diagnosed with lung cancer in 1985. He died in Nashville, Tennessee, on June 27, 1986. His guitar hero was Mother Maybelle Carter, matriarch of the Carter Family. Maybelle's daughter June Carter Cash and June's husband Johnny Cash so admired Maphis that he was laid to rest in the Cash and Carter family Hendersonville, Tennessee, burial plot next to Maybelle, her husband, Ezra Carter, and her daughter, Anita Carter.

== Maphis family ==
They had three children: Dale, Lorrie and Jody. Dale died in an automobile accident in 1989. Jody Maphis is an active musician. He has played drums or guitar for Earl Scruggs, Johnny Rodriguez, Johnny Cash, Gary Allan, Marty Stuart and many others.

== Mosrite guitar ==
Today, TNM Guitars manufactures a remake of the Mosrite guitar, recreated by guitar luthier Terry N. McArthur.
