= Henri Berger =

Prussian-Hawaiian musical artist (1844–1929)

Henry Berger Heinrich Berger
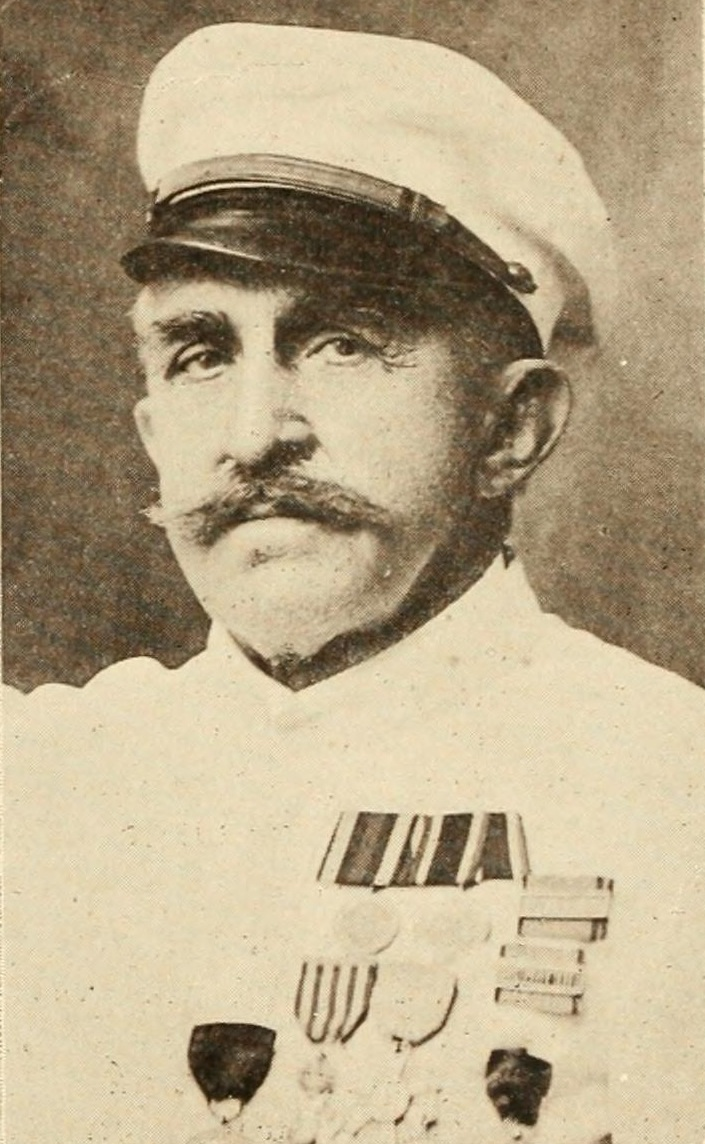
- Henry Berger c. 1917

Background information
- Also known as: Henri Berger
- Born: Heinrich August Wilhelm Berger; August 4, 1844; Berlin, Kingdom of Prussia
- Died: October 14, 1929 (aged 85) Territory of Hawaii, US
- Genres: Hawaiian, March
- Occupation: Bandmaster
- Years active: 1872-1915

Henry Berger (sometimes spelled Henri Berger; August 4, 1844 – October 14, 1929) was a Prussian-born Kapellmeister, composer, and royal bandmaster of the Kingdom of Hawaiʻi from 1872 to 1915.

== Biography ==
Berger was born Heinrich August Wilhelm Berger in Berlin, and became a first-rate musician as a member of the army band in the 2nd Foot Guards of the Prussian Army. He played in the orchestras of Johann Strauss, Jr. across Europe.

Originally, Kaiser Wilhelm I of Germany loaned Berger from his Potsdam station to King Kamehameha V to conduct the king's band. He arrived in Honolulu in June 1872, fresh from service in the Franco-Prussian War. In 1877, King Kalākaua appointed Berger to full leadership of the Royal Hawaiian Band. In 1879, he became a naturalized citizen of the Kingdom of Hawaii.

Berger befriended the future Queen Liliʻuokalani, a composer in her own right. Berger arranged the songs she wrote, performed by the brass band. On August 4, 1881, while traveling the world, King Kalākaua reported in a letter from Berlin to Regent Liliʻuokalani, that he had met the mother and sister of Berger and announced the sending of a program whose pieces Berger was to play with the Royal Hawaiian Band upon his return. The queen named Berger the "Father of Hawaiian Music". From 1893 to 1903, the bandmaster worked with the Kamehameha Schools to develop its music program. He also built what is today the Honolulu Symphony.

He led the government band at thousands of public events. Among these were "steamer day," when a ship left the Honolulu docks. The band serenaded the departees with "Auld Lang Syne," or "The Girl I Left Behind Me."

Later in his tenure as royal bandmaster, Berger took it upon himself to record traditional Hawaiian hymns, chants and other Hawaiian music in print to ensure their survival, a task never done before. Berger at the same time composed the classics: "The Hula March", "Hilo March", "Kohala March", “Huki March”, “Ka Mo’i March” and "Sweet Lei Lehua." His arrangement of "Hawaiʻi Ponoʻī", with text by Kalākaua in honor of Kamehameha became the national anthem. Today, the song serves as the state anthem.

Berger combined German, Austrian and Hawaiian traditions in his unique compositions and performed with the Royal Hawaiian Band thousands of times, making Hawaiian music known and popular in many countries. Berger started the RHB 'Aloha" welcome and farewell greetings at the harbors.

Recognizing his promotion of Hawaiian culture abroad, Kalākaua conferred the Royal Order of the Star of Oceania upon Berger.

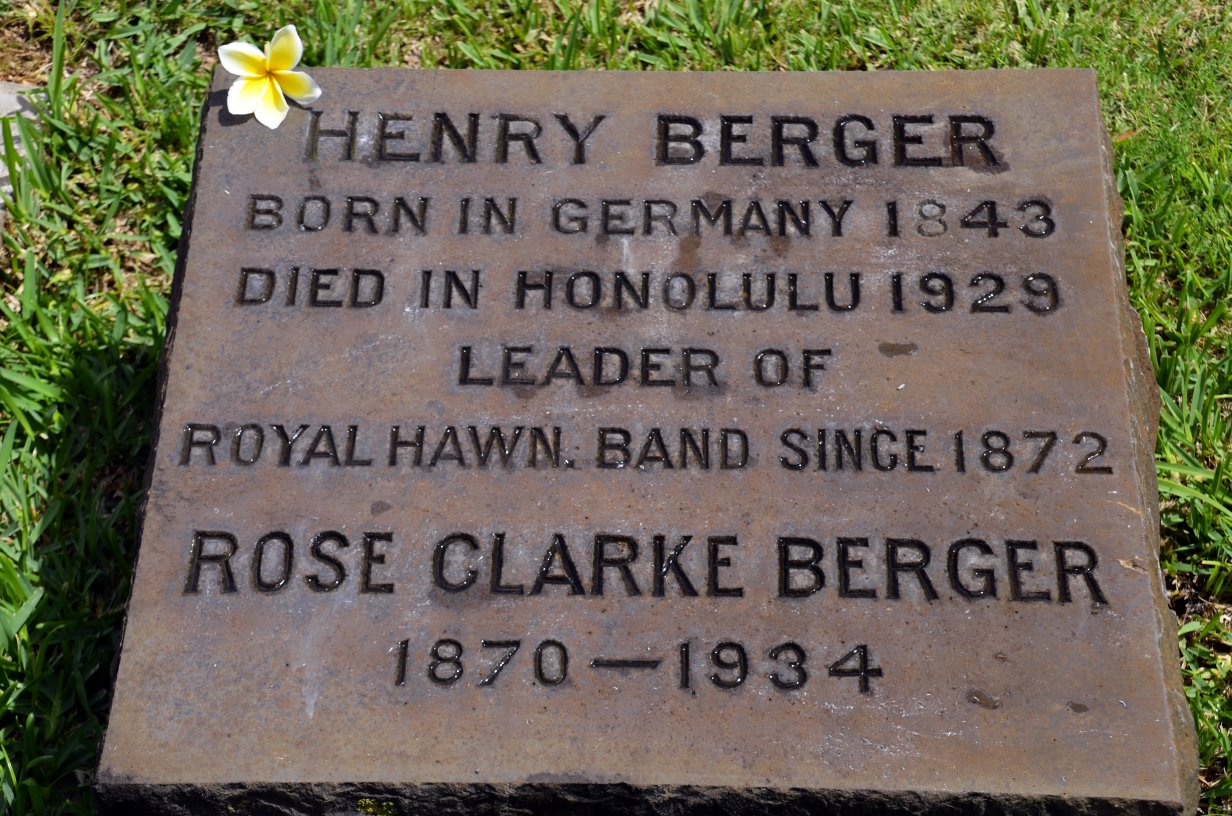
Gravestone of Henry Berger at the Kawaiahaʻo Church Cemetery

He died in Honolulu. His resting-place is the Kawaiahaʻo Church Cemetery.

Robert Louis Stevenson mentioned Berger in his novel The Bottle Imp.

Berger's legacy continues today, celebrated worldwide especially in Hawaii and Germany, as the father of the Royal Hawaiian Band, the oldest municipal band in the United States.

== Literature ==
- Patrick D. Hennessey: Henry Berger: From Prussian Army Musician to "Father of Hawaiian Music". The Life and Legacy of Hawai'i's Bandmaster, Tutzing: Schneider, 2013, ISBN 978-3-86296-056-9
