= Aloha ʻOe =

Song by Lili'uokalani, Princess of the Hawaiian Kingdom

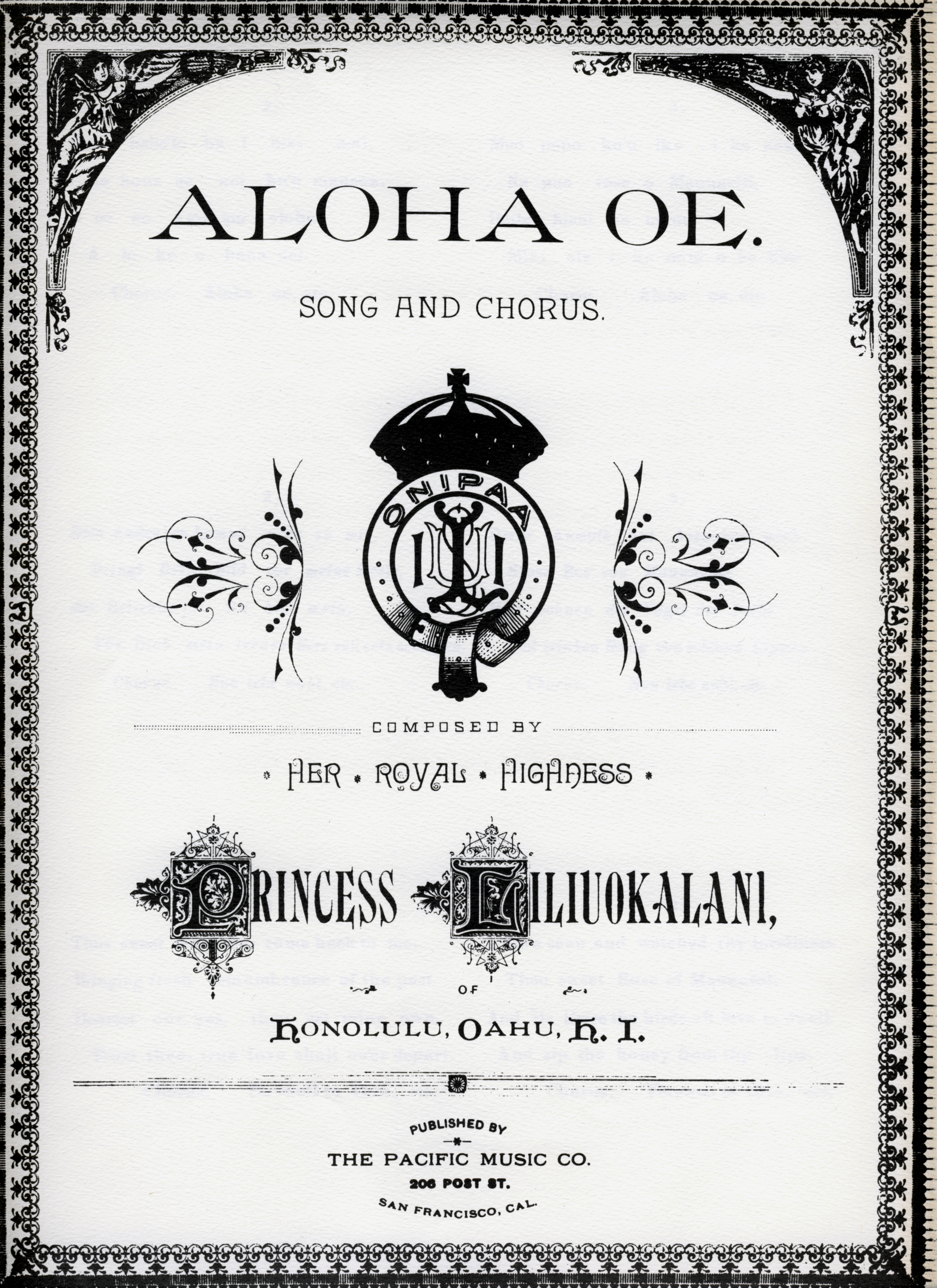
Cover of "Aloha ʻOe", 1890

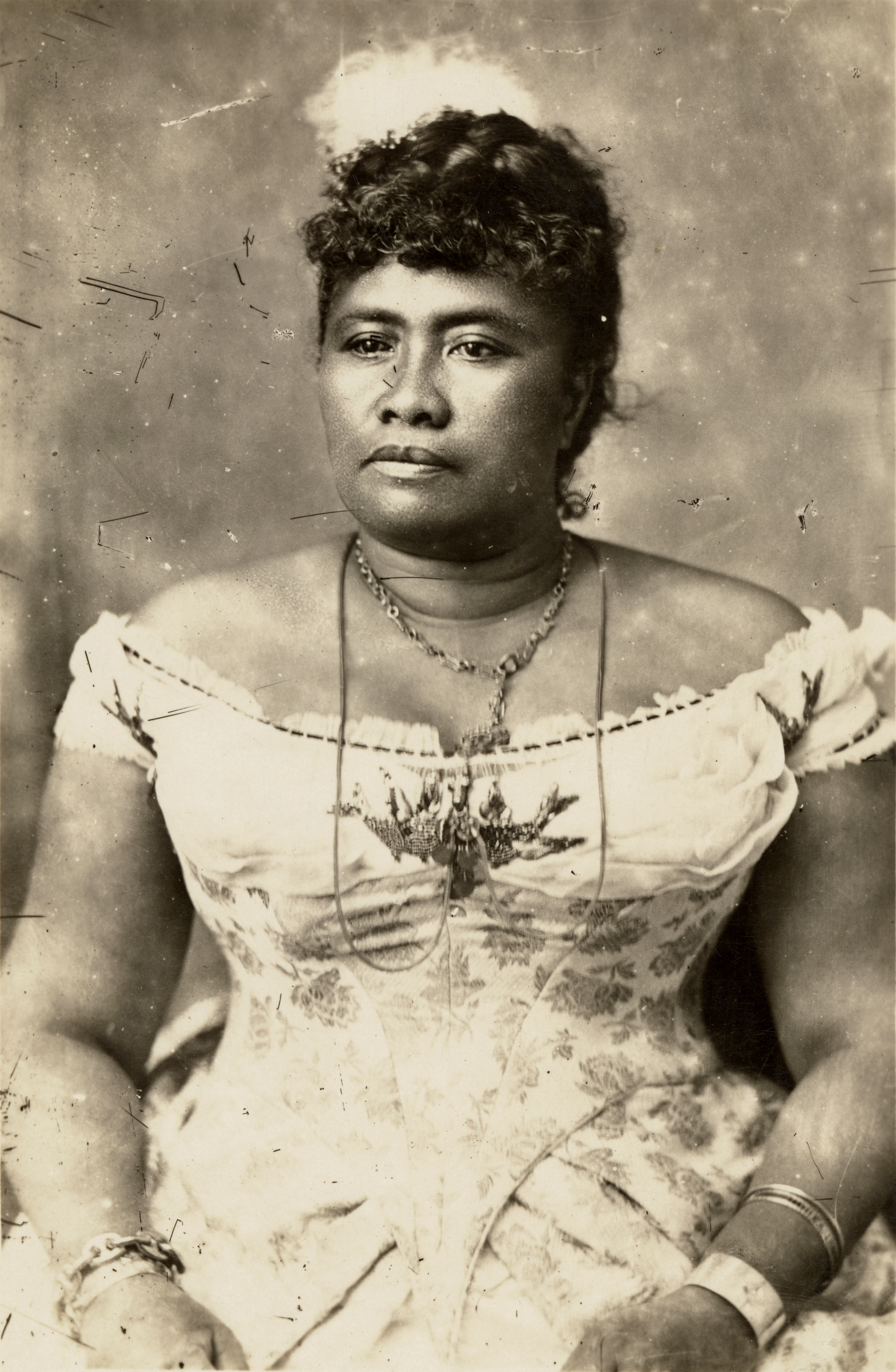
Queen Liliʻuokalani

Aloha Oe
"Aloha Oe" by Madam Nani Alapai and Henry N. Clark, 1911

Aloha Oe
"Aloha Oe" by William Smith and Walter Kolomoku, 1915

"Aloha ʻOe" ("Farewell to Thee") is a Hawaiian folk song written c. 1878 by Queen "Lydia" Liliʻuokalani, who was then princess of the Hawaiian Kingdom. It is her most famous song and is a common cultural symbol for Hawaii.

== Background ==
The story of the origin of the song has several variations. They all have in common that the song was inspired by a notable farewell embrace given by Colonel James Harbottle Boyd during a horseback trip taken by Princess Liliʻuokalani in 1877 or 1878 to the Boyd ranch in Maunawili on the windward side of Oʻahu, and that the members of the party hummed the tune on the way back to Honolulu. Different versions tell of alternate recipients of the embrace—either Liliʻuokalani's sister Princess Likelike Cleghorn or a young lady at the ranch. According to the most familiar version of the story:

This tender farewell set Liliʻuokalani to thinking, and she began humming to herself on the homeward trip. Overhearing, Charles Wilson observed, "That sounds like The Lone Rock by the Sea," a comment with which Liliʻuokalani is said to have agreed. When the party paused to rest in an orange grove on the Honolulu side of the Pali, the others joined in the hummings, and the song was completed later at Washington Place.

The Hawaiʻi State Archives preserves a hand-written manuscript by Liliʻuokalani, dated 1878, with the score of the song, the Hawaiian-language lyrics, Liliʻuokalani's English translation, and her note evidently added later: "Composed at Maunawili 1878. Played by the Royal Hawaiian Band in San Francisco August 1883 and became very popular."

The first known recording of the song was released by Berliner Gramophone in 1898. A catalogue issued by Columbia Records in 1901 mentioned two wax cylinders labeled "Vocal Solos in Hawaiian", containing some of the earlier recordings of "Aloha ʻOe" and "Kuʻu Pua I Paoakalani". However, it is uncertain if this was recorded in Hawaii or if the performer was Hawaiian and the cylinders are now lost. Columbia Records later recorded a duet of the song by Nani Alapai and Henry N. Clark in 1911. A 1913 score can be seen at the Levy Sheet Music Collection.

== Lyrics ==
Haʻaheo e ka ua i nā pali	Proudly swept the rain by the cliffs
Ke nihi aʻela i ka nahele	As it glided through the trees
E hahai (uhai) ana paha i ka liko	Still following ever the bud
Pua ʻāhihi lehua o uka	The ʻāhihi lehua (Note: A Hawaiian flower (Metrosideros tremuloides)) of the vale
Hui:	Chorus:
Aloha ʻoe, aloha ʻoe	Farewell to thee, farewell to thee
E ke onaona noho i ka lipo	The charming one who dwells in the shaded bowers
One fond embrace,	One fond embrace,
A hoʻi aʻe au	Ere I depart
Until we meet again	Until we meet again
ʻO ka haliʻa aloha i hiki mai	Sweet memories come back to me
Ke hone aʻe nei i	Bringing fresh remembrances
Kuʻu manawa	Of the past
ʻO ʻoe nō kuʻu ipo aloha	Dearest one, yes, you are mine own
A loko e hana nei	From you, true love shall never depart
Hui	Chorus
Maopopo kuʻu ʻike i ka nani	I have seen and watched your loveliness
Nā pua rose o Maunawili	The sweet rose of Maunawili
I laila hiaʻai nā manu	And 'tis there the birds of love dwell
Mikiʻala i ka nani o ka liko	And sip the honey from your lips
Hui	Chorus

== Musicology ==
Parts of "Aloha ʻOe" resemble the song "The Lone Rock by the Sea" and the chorus of George Frederick Root's 1854 song "There's Music in the Air". "The Lone Rock by the Sea" mentioned by Charles Wilson, was "The Rock Beside the Sea" published by Charles Crozat Converse in 1857, which itself was derived from a Croatian/Serbian folk song, "Sedi Mara na kamen studencu" (Mary is Sitting on a Stone Well). The chorus' melody was also used as the counterpoint to the chorus of the jazz song "Hula Lou" and also could be a counterpoint to Woody Guthrie's folk song "This Land Is Your Land" or Dan Baird's "I Love You Period".

== Notable recordings ==
- 1911 Nani Alapai and Henry N. Clark – recording for Columbia Records
- 1913 The Hawaiian Quintette with Walter Kolomoku on steel guitar - This recording was selected for preservation in the National Recording Registry by the Library of Congress in 2025.
- 1924 Frank Ferera – this reached the charts of the day.
- 1936 Bing Crosby – recorded July 23, 1936 with Dick Mcintyre and His Harmony Hawaiians.
- 1946 Les Paul and His Trio – recorded March 29, 1946 for Decca Records (catalog No.23685).
- 1961 Elvis Presley - recorded March 21–23, 1961 for RCA Records as the soundtrack for the film Blue Hawaii.
- 1970 Don Ho - recorded for Reprise Records in 1970 for the album Don Ho - Hawaii's Greatest Hits.
- 2010 Johnny Cash - recorded for American Recordings in 2003 for the album American VI: Ain't No Grave.

== Film appearances ==
- 1932 One Way Passage
- 1934 Flirtation Walk – sung by chorus and Dick Powell
- 1936 Waikiki Wedding – sung by chorus
- 1937 Hawaiian Holiday
- 1937 The Hurricane
- 1938 Hawaii Calls
- 1941 Notes to You
- 1953 From Here to Eternity
- 1958 Knighty Knight Bugs
- 1961 Blue Hawaii – sung by Elvis Presley November 22, 1961
- 1989 The Karate Kid Part III — hummed by Daniel while changing
- 2002 Lilo & Stitch – the song is sung briefly by the character Nani Pelekai (voiced by Tia Carrere) as a means to say goodbye to her sister Lilo, from whom she was preparing to be separated the following day. It is sung again in its franchise's fourth film Leroy & Stitch (2006) by Lilo (Daveigh Chase), Stitch (Chris Sanders), and Reuben (Rob Paulsen) to shut down the Leroy clones. Carrere's performance of the song, with added backing instrumentation, also appears on the soundtrack of Lilo & Stitch 2: Stitch Has a Glitch (2005). It is sung once again in the 2025 Lilo & Stitch live-action remake by Nani (portrayed by Sydney Agudong) with Lilo (portrayed by Maia Kealoha) singing with her during the hammock scene.
- 2005 Aloha, Scooby-Doo! – Sung by the Wikki Tikki in the film's climax.
- 2016 Train to Busan – partially sung by one of the main characters, and is also instrumental in the film's conclusion.

== In popular culture ==
The 1932 Summer Olympics orchestra played "Aloha ʻOe", at the closing ceremony in Los Angeles as the olympic flame was extinguished ending the ceremony.

"Aloha ʻOe" appeared in the scores of many of Warner Bros.' classic Looney Tunes and Merrie Melodies cartoons, as composer Carl Stalling's stock musical cue for Hawaii-themed gags. Usually instrumental, but Bugs Bunny actually sings one line of the refrain at the very end of Case of the Missing Hare. In the 1953 cartoon short Duck Amuck, part of it is briefly sung by Daffy Duck when the scenery is changed to a Hawaiian setting, courtesy of a sadistic mystery animator and again in A Squeak in the Deep. In the 1958 Oscar-winning short Knighty Knight Bugs, the cartoon ends with an enchanted sword performing an instrumental version of the song (played by a musical saw).

The song has appeared in several instances throughout Disney's Lilo & Stitch franchise. In Lilo & Stitch (2002), Nani sings it to Lilo as a farewell the night before they were to be separated. In the Lilo & Stitch: The Series episode "Spooky" (2003), Lilo reveals to Stitch that she sings the song to herself as a coping mechanism, which leads to Stitch doing so for himself later in the same episode, to Lilo's approval. In Leroy & Stitch (2006), Jumba Jookiba uses Elvis Presley's cover of the song during the creation of Leroy to secretly program a fail-safe within him; this is exploited during the climax in Stitch (dressed up as Presley), Lilo, and Reuben (along with several of the Experiments near the end) play an upbeat rock version during the finale to shut Leroy and his clones down.

In the episode "Cruise Cat" of Tom and Jerry (1952), a guitar version of this song plays in the background.

In the first episode of the 1963 Hanna-Barbera cartoon Top Cat entitled "Hawaii, Here We Come", at the start of the episode, Benny the Ball sings the song, after winning a free trip to Hawaii, sometime later Officer Dibble also sings the song. They both, however, replace some of the lyrics with English ones.

In the Japanese anime Space Dandy (created in 2014), the eponymous main character is captain of a spaceship called the Aloha Oe.

The Jack London short story Aloha Oe features the chorus of the song.

When Jiang Zemin, then-Chinese President and the General Secretary of the Chinese Communist Party, arrived at Hawaii at the beginning of his state visit to the United States in October 1997, he played "Aloha ʻOe" with a Hawaiian lap steel guitar and invited then Hawaiian First Lady Vicky Cayetano to sing the song at a dinner with the presence of Governor Ben Cayetano. Jiang recounted that he used to frequently play this song when he was in college in 1940s.

Aloha 'Oe also inspired a traditional farewell ceremony of the same name for graduating seniors of the University of Tennessee beginning in 1926.

== See also ==
- Music of Hawaii
- List of compositions by Liliʻuokalani
