= Royal Hawaiian Band =

Municipal band in Honolulu, Hawaiʻi

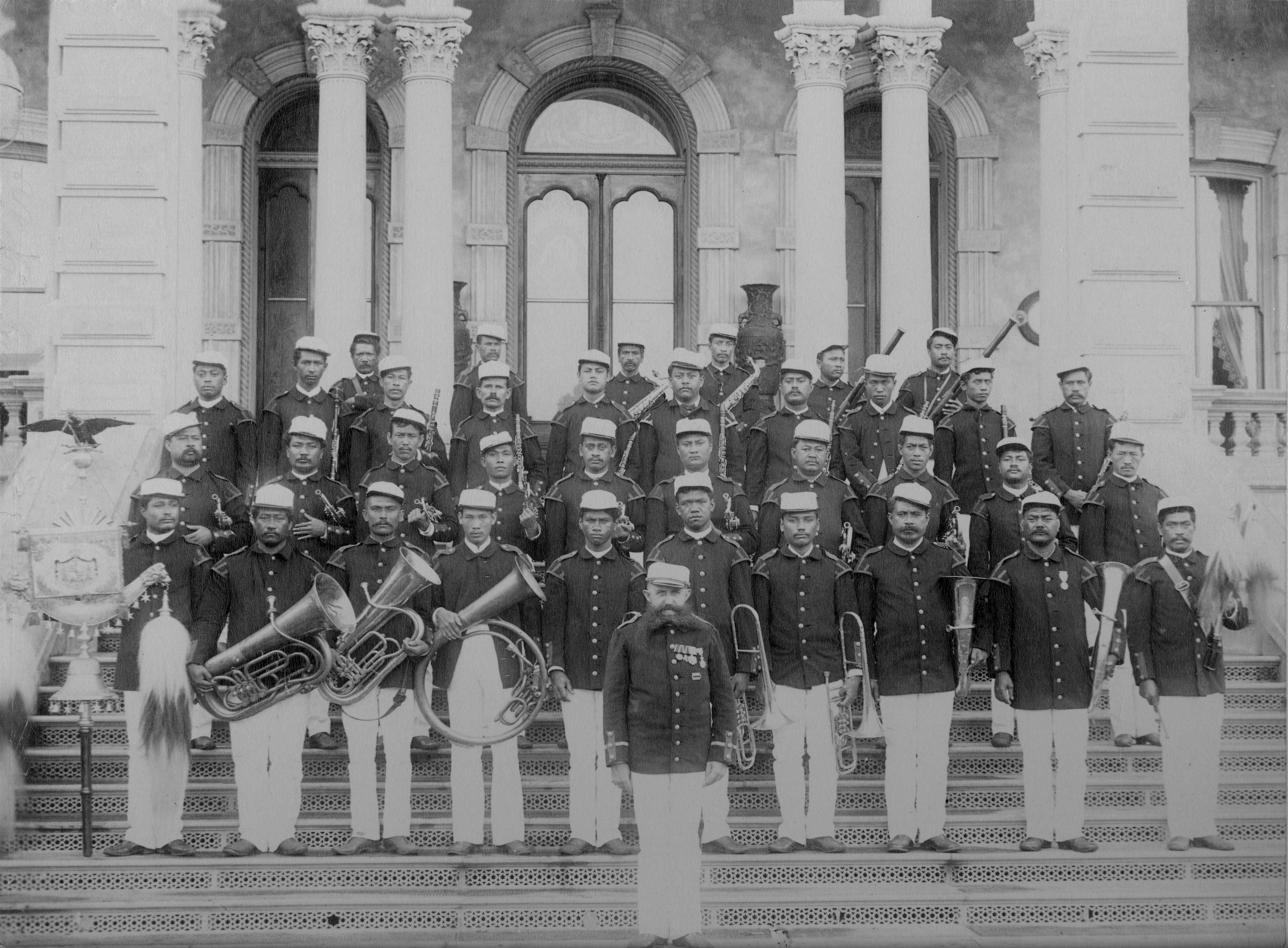
The band c. 1889

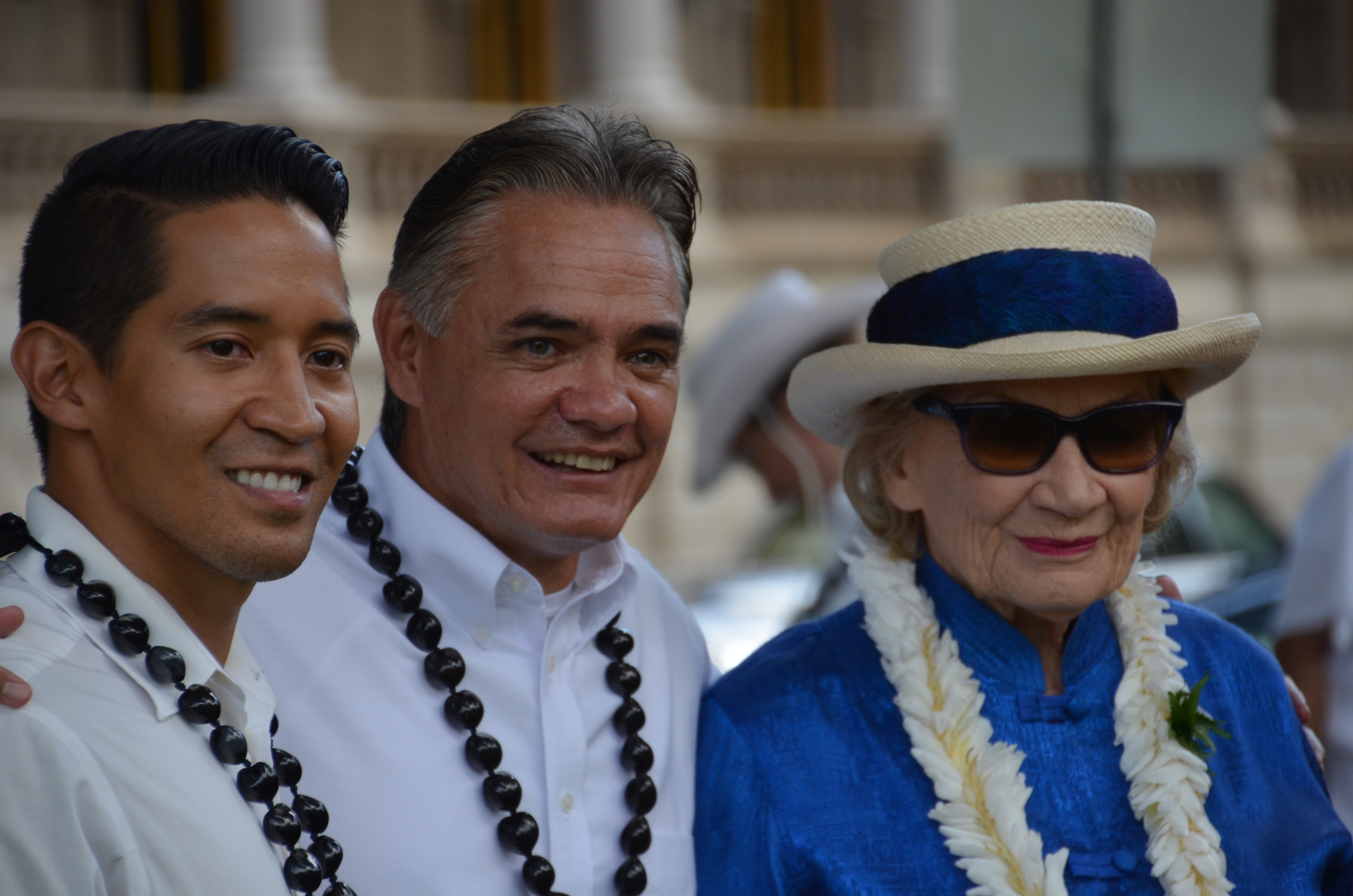
Bandmaster Clarke Bright (center) with Abigail Kinoiki Kekaulike Kawānanakoa (right)

The Royal Hawaiian Band is the oldest and only full-time municipal band in the United States. At present a body of the City & County of Honolulu, the Royal Hawaiian Band has been entertaining Honolulu residents and visitors since its inception in 1836 by Kamehameha III. During the monarchy it was nominally a military band. It reached global prominence under the leadership of Prussian Heinrich "Henri" Berger, an officer of the imperial German army loaned to the Kingdom of Hawaiʻi in 1872. Berger composed many beloved marching tunes and other melodies, and would later be honored with the title of "Father of Hawaiian Music." He collaborated with King Kalākaua in creating Hawaiʻi Ponoʻi, the national anthem of Hawaiʻi; it is still used today as the official state song.

During its long and distinguished history, the Royal Hawaiian band inspired the development of other brass bands in Hawaii, and possibly elsewhere in Polynesia and the Pacific. According to researcher Patrick Hennessey, the band may even be credited for originally introducing Hawaii's song "Aloha 'Oe" to the United States mainland.

As of 2008, the Royal Hawaiian Band is composed of 40 full-time musicians under the baton of Bandmaster Clarke Bright, previously conducted by Michael Nakasone. The band performs every Friday at noon on the grass grounds of the historic Iolani Palace in downtown Honolulu and on Sundays at one o'oclock at the Kapiolani Park Bandstand in Waikiki.
