= Weir Here – The Best of Bob Weir =

2004 compilation album by Bob Weir

Weir Here – The Best Of Bob Weir

Greatest hits album by Bob Weir
- Released: March 23, 2004
- Recorded: 1972–2003
- Genre: Rock, jam
- Length: 155:24
- Label: Hybrid Recordings

Bob Weir chronology
Live at Roseland (2000)	Weir Here – The Best Of Bob Weir (2004)	Fall 1989: The Long Island Sound (2013)

Professional ratings
Review scores
Source	Rating
AllMusic	4.5/5 stars
The Music Box	4/5 stars

Weir Here – The Best of Bob Weir is a 2004 live/studio compilation album featuring former Grateful Dead rhythm guitarist and co-vocalist Bob Weir. A career retrospective, it features tracks from many of Weir's bands, solo and duo projects, as well as those from his main gig with the Dead.

== Content ==
Similarly to Birth of the Dead, The album contains two discs – one studio and one live. The studio disc proceeds chronologically, beginning with Weir's first solo effort and then including his work in the bands Kingfish, RatDog, Weir & Wasserman (though the duo is here a trio, augmented by Neil Young), Bobby & the Midnites, and one track by the Grateful Dead. The final track of the disc is from a then-recent appearance on a children's album by Dan Zanes (of Del Fuegos fame).

The live disc features a variety of songs from Grateful Dead performances with Weir as the lead singer – though five of the tracks were previously unreleased – and one track by RatDog (a Dylan cover from a 2003 band rehearsal).

== Production and critical reception ==
The album was compiled by Hybrid Recordings, with final approval by Weir. It is currently out of print. The cover art is by Alton Kelley with liner notes by Grateful Dead publicist Dennis McNally. The title refers to the focus being on Weir, "speaking up" as the Dead's "secondary" guitarist, and is a pun on "we're here", a reference to the existential element of attending a live Grateful Dead concert (and in general).

In the album's press release, Andrew Clarke of The Independent called Bob Weir "arguably rock's greatest, if most eccentric, rhythm guitarist." Joel Selvin of the San Francisco Chronicle said, "No major rock star's solo career has ever received less attention than Weir's." He said the album "[shines] some light on Weir's long-term (albeit secondary) solo career", and that "he can let other musicians pick out the material he sings. He doesn't care about that. He is the rarest of musical animals – a hands-off bandleader. It hasn't exactly been a bell-ringing, million-selling solo career. Still, underachiever Weir has never gotten his due for some genuine high points and a whole lot of good music under his own brand."

== Track listing ==
Disc one - studio

No.	Title	Writer(s)	Original album	Length
1.	"Cassidy"	John Perry Barlow, Bob Weir	Ace, 1972	3:42
2.	"Mexicali Blues"	Barlow, Weir	Ace	3:27
3.	"Looks Like Rain"	Barlow, Weir	Ace	6:11
4.	"Playing in the Band"	Weir, Robert Hunter, Mickey Hart	Ace	7:38
5.	"One More Saturday Night"	Weir	Ace	4:31
6.	"Lazy Lightnin'" (performed by Kingfish)	Barlow, Weir	Kingfish, 1976	3:02
7.	"Supplication" (performed by Kingfish)	Barlow, Weir	Kingfish	2:57
8.	"Feel Like a Stranger" (performed by the Grateful Dead)	Barlow, Weir	Go to Heaven, 1980	5:08
9.	"Easy to Slip"	Lowell George, Martin Kibbee	Heaven Help the Fool, 1978	3:06
10.	"Wrong Way Feelin'"	Barlow, Weir	Heaven Help the Fool	5:12
11.	"Shade of Grey"	Barlow, Weir	Heaven Help the Fool	4:30
12.	"(I Want to) Fly Away" (performed by Bobby and the Midnites)	Barlow, Weir	Bobby and the Midnites, 1981	3:59
13.	"Easy Answers" (with Rob Wasserman and Neil Young)	Bob Bralove, Hunter, Wasserman, Weir, Vince Welnick	Trios, 1993	6:01
14.	"Two Djinn" (performed by RatDog)	Gerrit Graham, Jeff Chimenti, Mark Karan, Jay Lane, McGinn, Wasserman, Weir	Evening Moods, 2000	9:04
15.	"Ashes and Glass" (performed by Ratdog)	Andre Pessis, Chimenti, Dave Ellis, Karan, Lane, McGinn, Wasserman, Weir	Evening Moods	5:55
16.	"Wabash Cannonball" (with Dan Zanes & Friends)	traditional	House Party, 2003	3:41

Disc two - live

All tracks performed by the Grateful Dead, except track 11 performed by RatDog.

No.	Title	Writer(s)	Recording date	Length
1.	"Truckin'"	Hunter, Jerry Garcia, Phil Lesh, Weir	April 29, 1971	9:22
2.	"Estimated Prophet"	Barlow, Weir	March 21, 1990	11:09
3.	"Hell in a Bucket"	Barlow, Weir, Brent Mydland	October 12, 1989	6:24
4.	"Me and Bobby McGee"	Fred Foster, Kris Kristofferson	April 24, 1972	6:04
5.	"New Minglewood Blues"	traditional, arr. Weir	October 14, 1989	6:13
6.	"Man Smart, Woman Smarter"	Norman Span	July 4, 1989	4:27
7.	"Jack Straw"	Hunter, Weir	May 26, 1972	5:05
8.	"Sugar Magnolia"	Hunter, Weir	April 25, 1971	6:00
9.	"Throwing Stones"	Weir, Barlow	July 26, 1987	7:53
10.	"The Music Never Stopped"	Weir, Barlow	July 17, 1989	8:58
11.	"Masters of War"	Bob Dylan	March 19, 2003	5:34
