= Rockin' the Rhein with the Grateful Dead =

Live album by Grateful Dead
- Released: May 25, 2004
- Recorded: April 24, 1972
- Genres: Psychedelic rock Jam band
- Length: 227:02
- Label: Rhino Records
- Producers: David Lemieux; Jeffrey Norman

Grateful Dead chronology
Dick's Picks Volume 31 (2004)	Rockin' the Rhein with the Grateful Dead (2004)	Dick's Picks Volume 32 (2004)

Professional ratings
Review scores
Source	Rating
Allmusic	3/5 stars
The Music Box	5/5 stars
Rolling Stone	3/5 stars

Rockin' the Rhein with the Grateful Dead is a Grateful Dead triple live album released in 2004. It was recorded April 24, 1972, at "Rheinhallen" (Halle Sechs der Messe Düsseldorf), in the German town of Düsseldorf, during the band's European tour of 1972. The complete concert is included, but the order of the tracks on the CD was altered to fit the show on three discs, while preserving groups of segued tracks.

The two bonus tracks, "Turn On Your Lovelight" and "The Stranger (Two Souls in Communion)", were recorded May 24, 1972, in London, England. Additional tracks from this date had been previously released on Steppin' Out with the Grateful Dead. Pre-orders through the Grateful Dead Store included a bonus disc, recorded during the band's seven-day run at the Academy of Music in New York City, the last American shows before the European tour. More from this run was released on Dick's Picks Volume 30 and Dave's Picks Volume 14.

The April 24, 1972 show was later released with the entire tour, and the song order intact, on four discs as part of Europe '72: The Complete Recordings, along with the London tracks.

== Track listing ==
=== Disc one ===
First set:

1. "Truckin' " (Jerry Garcia, Phil Lesh, Bob Weir, Robert Hunter) – 11:04
2. "Tennessee Jed" (Garcia, Hunter) – 8:07
3. "Chinatown Shuffle" (Ron "Pigpen" McKernan) – 3:06
4. "Black-Throated Wind" (Weir, John Barlow) – 6:51
5. "China Cat Sunflower" (Garcia, Hunter) – 6:06 →
6. "I Know You Rider" (traditional, arr. Grateful Dead) – 6:19
7. "Mr. Charlie" (McKernan, Hunter) – 4:16
8. "Beat It on Down the Line" (Jesse Fuller) – 3:21
9. "Loser" (Garcia, Hunter) – 7:34
10. "Playing in the Band" (Weir, Mickey Hart, Hunter) – 11:23
11. "Next Time You See Me" (Earl Forest, Bill Harvey) – 4:37
12. "Me and Bobby McGee" (Fred Foster, Kris Kristofferson) – 6:10 (Note: Previously released on Weir Here.)

=== Disc two ===
First set, continued:

1. "Good Lovin' " (Rudy Clark, Arthur Resnick) – 18:39
2. "Casey Jones" (Garcia, Hunter) – 6:15

Third set: (Note: "Due to the length limitations of the CD format, some very minor adjustments had to be made to the show's running order, both to keep all of the musical sequences intact and to present you with the complete show, unabridged." (CD liner notes))

3. "He's Gone" (Garcia, Hunter) – 10:31
4. "Hurts Me Too" (Elmore James, Marshall Sehorn) – 8:36
5. "El Paso" (Marty Robbins) – 4:44

Bonus tracks – May 24, 1972 at Lyceum Theatre, London, England:

6. "Turn on Your Love Light" (Deadric Malone, Joseph Wade Scott) – 12:04 (Note: "...This is the last-ever version of 'Turn on Your Lovelight' sung by Pigpen, included for your enjoyment." (CD liner notes)) →
7. "The Stranger (Two Souls in Communion)" (McKernan) – 8:23

=== Disc three ===
Second set:

1. "Dark Star" (Garcia, Hart, Bill Kreutzmann, Lesh, McKernan, Weir, Hunter) – 25:46 →
2. "Me & My Uncle" (Phillips) – 3:22 →
3. "Dark Star" (Garcia, Hart, Kreutzmann, Lesh, McKernan, Weir, Hunter) – 14:53 →
4. "Wharf Rat" (Garcia, Hunter) – 8:58 →
5. "Sugar Magnolia" (Hunter, Weir) – 8:03

Third set, continued:

6. "Not Fade Away" (Charles Hardin, Norman Petty) – 3:17 →
7. "Goin' Down the Road Feeling Bad" (traditional, arr. Grateful Dead) – 6:31 →
8. "Not Fade Away" (Holly, Petty) – 3:01

Encore:

9. "One More Saturday Night" (Weir) – 4:49

=== Bonus Disc ===
"Academy of Music, New York City March 1972"

1. "Playing in the Band" (Weir, Hart, Hunter) – 10:00
2. "Sugar Magnolia" (Weir, Hunter) – 7:45 →
3. "Caution (Do Not Stop on Tracks)" (Grateful Dead) – 19:02 →
4. "Jam" (Grateful Dead) – 6:20 →
5. "Uncle John's Band" (Garcia, Hunter) – 7:55
6. "Dark Star" (Garcia, Hart, Kreutzmann, McKernan, Lesh, Weir, Hunter) – 22:39
- Tracks 1 & 6, March 23, 1972
- Tracks 2 – 5, March 22, 1972

== Personnel ==
Grateful Dead:

- Jerry Garcia – guitar, vocals
- Bob Weir – guitar (rhythm), vocals
- Phil Lesh – bass, vocals
- Ron "Pigpen" McKernan – organ, harmonica, percussion, vocals
- Bill Kreutzmann – drums
- Donna Jean Godchaux – vocals
- Keith Godchaux – piano

Production

- Betty Cantor-Jackson – recording
- Bob Matthews – recording
- Jim Furman – recording
- Dennis Leonard – recording
- Jeffrey Norman – mixing
- David Lemieux – tape archivist
- Eileen Law/Grateful Dead Archives – archival research
- Richard Biffle – cover art
- Mary Ann Mayer – photographs
- Grateful Dead Archives – photographs
- Brian Connors – art coordination
- Robert Minkin – package layout and production
- Wizard – doodles [Inside the CD package are pictures of the actual tape reels with drawings on the protective covers]

== Charts ==
Album - Billboard

Year	Chart	Position
2004	The Billboard 200	75
2004	Top Internet albums	75
