= Kingfish (1985 album) =

1985 studio album by Kingfish

Studio album by Kingfish
- Released: 1985
- Recorded: 1973 – 1980
- Genre: Rock
- Length: 41:11
- Label: Relix
- Producer: Matt Kelly; Barry Flast

Kingfish chronology
Trident (1978)	Kingfish (1985)	Alive in Eighty Five (1985)

Professional ratings
Review scores
Source	Rating
AllMusic	4.5/5 stars

Kingfish is an album by the rock band Kingfish. It contains previously unreleased tracks that were recorded at various times during the band's first eight years, and is sometimes referred to as Kingfish (1973–80). Released by Relix Records as a vinyl LP in 1985, side one was recorded in the studio, and side two was recorded live. It was released on CD in 1991.

Kingfish is not to be confused with the band's 1976 debut album, which is also titled Kingfish.

Bob Weir of the Grateful Dead, who was a member of Kingfish from 1974 to 1976, plays on seven of the album's thirteen songs.

== Track listing ==
LP side one — studio cuts:

1. "Mess Around" (Ahmet Ertegun) – 3:00
2. "Put Your Hand on Me" (John Lee Hooker) – 4:52
3. "My Pledge of Love" (Joe Stafford) – 3:12
4. "Taste of the Devil" (Barry Flast) – 3:14
5. "Fox on the Run" (Tony Hazzard) – 2:53
6. "Feels So Good" (Bob Hogins, Michael O'Neill, Dave Torbert) – 3:00
7. "Juke" (Little Walter) – 2:27

LP side two — live cuts:

8. "Hidden Charms" (Willie Dixon) – 3:05
9. "School Days" (Chuck Berry) – 2:21
10. "Road Runner" (Brian Holland, Lamont Dozier, Edward Holland, Jr.) – 4:21
11. "Young Blood" (Jerry Leiber, Mike Stoller, Doc Pomus) – 2:33
12. "Promised Land" (Berry) – 3:43
13. "Key to the Highway" (Charlie Segar, Big Bill Broonzy) – 4:51

== Personnel ==
=== Musicians ===
- Matt Kelly – guitar, harmonica, vocals
- Dave Torbert – bass, vocals
- Bob Weir – guitar, vocals
- Barry Flast – Hammond B-3 organ, piano, bass, vocals
- Robbie Hoddinott – guitar
- Chris Herold – drums
- Michael O'Neill – guitar, vocals
- Mick Ward – piano
- Garth Webber – guitar
- Fred Campbell – guitar, vocals
- Michael Bloomfield – guitar
- John Lee Hooker – vocals
- Patti Cathcart – vocals
- Barry Frost – piano
- David Rea – banjo
- Dave Perper – drums
- Jim Weiss – drums, vocals

Lead vocals: Matt Kelly on "Taste of the Devil", "Fox on the Run"; Dave Torbert on "Mess Around", "School Days", "Young Blood"; Bob Weir on "Hidden Charms", "Road Runner", "Promised Land"; Barry Flast on "My Pledge of Love", "Feels So Good"; Michael O'Neill on "Key to the Highway"; John Lee Hooker on "Put Your Hand on Me"

=== Production ===
- Matt Kelly – producer
- Barry Flast – producer
- Tim Hovey – live cuts engineer
- Gil Mance – cover art
- James A. Nelson – trident design

"This record is a living tribute to Dave Torbert, June 7, 1948 – Dec. 7, 1982."
