= Sundown on the Forest =

Studio album by Kingfish
- Released: April 20, 1999
- Genre: Rock
- Length: 58:08
- Label: Phoenix Rising
- Producer: Matthew Kelly

Kingfish chronology
A Night in New York (1997)	Sundown on the Forest (1999)	Live (2000)

Professional ratings
Review scores
Source	Rating
Allmusic	1.5/5 stars
The Music Box	3/5 stars

Sundown on the Forest is an album by the rock group Kingfish. It was recorded over a period of several years with different combinations of musicians, and released in 1999. It was the first studio album by Kingfish since Trident in 1978.

The various musical lineups on Sundown on the Forest include past and present members of Kingfish, such as Matthew Kelly, Steve Kimock, Barry Sless, Barry Flast, Danny "Rio" DeGennaro, Fred Campbell, Mookie Siegel, Robbie Hoddinott, Jimmy Sanchez, and Ana Rizzo. A number of guest musicians and singers also perform on the album, including Jenni Muldaur, the daughter of Maria Muldaur.

Bob Weir of the Grateful Dead, another former member of Kingfish, appears on several songs, and sings lead vocals on "Padlock Cufflinks", as well as a duet with Barry Flast on "Starship Ride". Jerry Garcia plays guitar on "Ridin' High", a track created by combining a recording session from 1973 with newly recorded parts.

== Track listing ==
1. "Hurt Enough" (Barry Flast)
2. "Sundown on the Forest" (Barry Flast, Michael Johnson)
3. "It Don't Take Much" (Marcus Strange)
4. "Burning in My Heart" (Barry Flast)
5. "Ridin' High" (Bill Cutler)
6. "Padlock Cufflinks" (James A. Nelson III, Barry Flast)
7. "Goodbye, So Long" (Marcus Strange)
8. "Every Little Light" (Matthew Kelly, Marcus Strange)
9. "Eyes of the Night" (Barry Flast)
10. "It Takes a Lot to Laugh, It Takes a Train to Cry" (Bob Dylan)
11. "My Baby Left Me" (Arthur Crudup)
12. "Tennessee Blues" (Bobby Charles)
13. "Starship Ride" (Country Joe McDonald)
14. "Jump for Joy" (John Carter, Tim Gilbert)

== Personnel ==
=== Musicians ===
- Matthew Kelly – guitar, harmonica, vocals
- Danny DeGennaro – vocals
- Barry Flast – piano, vocals, keyboard bass
- Rick Anderson – bass
- Fred Campbell – bass, acoustic guitar, vocals
- Caitlen Cornwell – vocals
- Jerry Cortez – guitar
- Bill Cutler – vocals
- Greg Douglas – guitar
- Zoe Ellis – vocals
- Jerry Garcia – guitar
- Robbie Hoddinott – guitar
- Steve Kimock – guitar
- Jenni Muldaur – vocals
- James A. Nelson III – percussion
- Eric Parker – drums
- Ray Parnell – guitar
- David Perper – drums
- Jimmy Pew – keyboards
- Robert Powell – pedal steel guitar
- Ari Rios – vocals
- Ana Rizzo – vocals
- Jimmy Sanchez – drums
- Mookie Siegel – piano, Hammond B3 organ, electric piano, synth flute, percussion
- David Simon-Baker – acoustic guitar
- Barry Sless – guitar, pedal steel guitar
- Bobby Vega – bass
- Bob Weir – acoustic guitar, vocals

=== Production ===
- Matthew Kelly and Barry Flast – producers
- Ari Rios, David Simon-Baker – mixing and mastering
- Stephen Hart, Michael Semanick – basic track engineers
- Eric Thompson – asst. engineer
- Tad Flynn – executive producer
- Mark Perlson – project coordinator
- Bruce Harman – cover artwork
- Sharon Carson – Kingfish logo design
- Yalitza Ferreras – design and layout
- Joanie Grayson, Robin Gascon – Kingfish's management
