= Holy Cow (song) =

1966 single by Lee Dorsey

Single by Lee Dorsey

from the album Working in the Coal Mine - Holy Cow
- B-side: "Operation Heartache"
- Released: October 1966
- Genre: Soul
- Length: 2:35
- Label: Amy
- Songwriter: Allen Toussaint
- Producers: Allen Toussaint, Marshall Sehorn

Lee Dorsey singles chronology
"Working in the Coal Mine" (1966)	"Holy Cow" (1966)	"Rain Rain Go Away" (1967)

"Holy Cow" is a song written by Allen Toussaint and performed by Lee Dorsey. It reached #6 on the UK Singles Chart, #10 on the U.S. R&B chart, and #23 on the U.S. pop chart in 1966. It was featured on his 1966 album Working in the Coal Mine - Holy Cow.

The song was arranged Allen Toussaint and produced by Toussaint and Marshall Sehorn.

== Other versions ==
- Buddy Lucas released a version of the song on his 1967 album Honkin' Sax.
- The Shadows released a version of the song on their 1967 album From Hank, Bruce, Brian and John.
- The Band released a version of the song on their 1973 album Moondog Matinee.
- Mike Finnigan released a version of the song on his 1976 album Mike Finnigan.
- Kingfish released a version of the song their 1985 album Alive in Eighty Five.
- Oily Rags released a version of the song on their 1985 album Oily Rags.
- Jools Holland released a version of the song as a single in 1990 with Vic and Bob (Vic Reeves and Bob Mortimer) on backing vocals, but it did not chart.
