= Alive in Eighty Five =

1985 live album by Kingfish

Live album by Kingfish
- Released: 1985
- Recorded: 1985
- Genre: Rock
- Label: Relix
- Producer: Matthew Kelly

Kingfish chronology
| Kingfish (1985) | Alive in Eighty Five (1985) | Kingfish in Concert: King Biscuit Flower Hour (1996) |

Professional ratings
Review scores
| Source | Rating |
|---|---|
| AllMusic | 2/5 stars |

Alive in Eighty Five — also known as Alive in '85 — is an album by the rock band Kingfish. It was recorded at Sweetwater Saloon in Mill Valley, California in 1985, and released by Relix Records as a vinyl LP later that year. It was released on CD in 1991.

According to William Rhulmann on AllMusic, the album is "said to have been recorded at the Sweetwater in Mill Valley, California (though it sounds like a studio set)".

== Track listing ==
1. "Big Boss Man" (Luther Dixon, Al Smith) – 3:37
2. "Dancing in the Streets" (Marvin Gaye, Ivy Jo Hunter, William "Mickey" Stevenson) – 4:35
3. "Rip It Up" (Robert Blackwell, John Marascalco) – 2:45
4. "Holy Cow" (Allen Toussaint) – 3:29
5. "Rumor at the Honky Tonk" (Barry Flast) – 4:01
6. "Money Honey" (Jesse Stone) – 3:46
7. "Statesboro Blues" (Blind Willie McTell) – 3:53
8. "40 Days and 40 Nights" (Bernard Roth) – 2:24

== Personnel ==
=== Kingfish ===
- Matthew Kelly – vocals, rhythm guitar, harp, and National steel slide guitar on "40 Days and 40 Nights" and "Statesboro Blues"
- Barry Flast – vocals, piano
- Robbie Hoddinott – lead guitar
- Garth Webber – lead guitar and rhythm guitar on "Dancing in the Streets", "Holy Cow", "Statesboro Blues", and "40 Days and 40 Nights"
- Steve Evans – bass
- David Perper – drums

=== Production ===
- Matthew Kelly – producer
- Betsey Grey – cover art
- Toni Brown – back cover design
