= Dave's Picks Volume 14 =

Live album by Grateful Dead
- Released: May 1, 2015
- Recorded: March 26, 1972
- Venue: Academy of Music; New York City
- Genre: Rock
- Length: 192:42 (bonus disc 70:27)
- Label: Rhino
- Producer: Grateful Dead

Grateful Dead chronology
The Best of the Grateful Dead (2015)	Dave's Picks Volume 14 (2015)	Dave's Picks Volume 15 (2015)

Alternative cover
- Dave's Picks 2015 Bonus Disc

Dave's Picks Volume 14 is a three-CD live album by the rock band the Grateful Dead containing the concert recorded March 26, 1972 at the Academy of Music in New York City It was released on May 1, 2015 as a limited edition of 16,500 numbered copies. Recorded during a seven-day run at the venue, the shows were the final American Grateful Dead shows before the Europe '72 tour commenced.

A bonus disc was included with shipments of the album to 2015 Dave's Picks subscribers, containing performances culled from other nights of the seven-concert run. Additional material from these shows had been released, in 2003, as Dick's Picks Volume 30, and selections from March 22 and 23, 1972 constituted the bonus disc of Rockin' the Rhein.

Dave's Picks Volume 14 was listed at No. 31 on the Billboard 200 for the week of May 16, 2015.

== Critical reception ==
On All About Jazz, Doug Collette wrote, "This latest entry in the ongoing archive series features is an unusual selection of tunes, at least insofar as this concert's position in the iconic band's timeline. The now-famous songs that debuted in England and elsewhere the next month are conspicuously absent here ('Jack Straw' is an exception), in place of which appear no less notable numbers such as 'Truckin' ', 'Wharf Rat' and 'Sugar Magnolia' plus a clutch of showpieces for keyboardist/vocalist Ron 'Pigpen' McKernan."

== Track listing ==
Disc 1
First set:

1. "Greatest Story Ever Told" (Bob Weir, Mickey Hart, Robert Hunter) – 5:51
2. "Cold Rain and Snow" (traditional, arranged by Grateful Dead) – 6:27
3. "Chinatown Shuffle" (Ron McKernan) – 3:19
4. "Black-Throated Wind" (Weir, John Barlow) – 6:24
5. "You Win Again" (Hank Williams) – 4:50
6. "Mr. Charlie" (McKernan, Hunter) – 4:12
7. "Jack Straw" (Weir, Hunter) – 4:57
8. "Loser" (Jerry Garcia, Hunter) – 6:54
9. "Looks Like Rain" (Weir, Barlow) – 7:58
10. "Big Railroad Blues" (Noah Lewis, arranged by Grateful Dead) – 4:36
11. "Big Boss Man" (Al Smith, Luther Dixon) – 5:10
12. "Playing in the Band" (Weir, Hart, Hunter) – 12:16
13. "El Paso" (Marty Robbins) – 4:19

Disc 2

1. "Good Lovin'" (Rudy Clark, Arthur Resnick) – 17:15

Second set:

2. "Truckin'" > (Garcia, Phil Lesh, Weir, Hunter) – 18:19
3. "Drums" > (Bill Kreutzmann) – 3:49
4. "The Other One" > (Weir, Kreutzmann) – 23:35
5. "Me and My Uncle" > (John Phillips) – 3:12
6. "The Other One" > (Weir, Kreutzmann) – 5:29

Disc 3

1. "Wharf Rat" (Garcia, Hunter) – 11:08
2. "Sugar Magnolia" (Weir, Hunter) – 7:40
3. "The Stranger (Two Souls in Communion)" (McKernan) – 8:23
4. "Not Fade Away" > (Norman Petty, Charles Hardin) – 5:31
5. "Goin' Down the Road Feeling Bad" > (traditional, arranged by Grateful Dead) – 8:00
6. "Not Fade Away" (Petty, Hardin) – 2:52

Dave's Picks 2015 Bonus Disc
Academy of Music, New York City, March 27, 1972: (Note: An additional track from this concert was released on Disc 1 of Dick's Picks Volume 30)

1. "Bertha" (Garcia, Hunter) – 6:57
2. "Brown-Eyed Women" (Garcia, Hunter) – 4:54
3. "China Cat Sunflower" > (Garcia, Hunter) – 5:51
4. "I Know You Rider" (traditional, arranged by Grateful Dead) – 5:11
5. "Cumberland Blues" (Garcia, Lesh, Hunter) – 5:09

Academy of Music, New York City, March 21, 1972:

1. "Truckin'" > (Garcia, Lesh, Weir, Hunter) – 11:06
2. "Drums" > (Kreutzmann) – 3:02
3. "The Other One" > (Weir, Kreutzmann) – 17:46
4. "Wharf Rat" (Garcia, Hunter) – 10:26

== Personnel ==
Grateful Dead

- Jerry Garcia – guitar, vocals, pedal steel
- Keith Godchaux – piano
- Bill Kreutzmann – drums
- Phil Lesh – electric bass, vocals
- Ron "Pigpen" McKernan – organ, harmonica, percussion, vocals
- Bob Weir – guitar, vocals

Production

- Produced by Grateful Dead
- Produced for release by David Lemieux
- Executive producer: Mark Pinkus
- Associate producers: Doran Tyson, Ivette Ramos
- CD mastering: Jeffrey Norman
- Recording: Rex Jackson
- Art direction, design: Steve Vance
- Cover art: Micah Nelson
- Photos: Rosina Rubin, Steve Bedney
- Tape research: Michael Wesley Johnson
- Archival research: Nicholas Meriwether
- Liner notes: Jesse Jarnow

== See also ==
- Dick's Picks Volume 30 – Recorded during the same stretch of shows at the Academy of Music in late March 1972.
