= Where the Beat Meets the Street =

1984 studio album by Bobby and the Midnites

Studio album by Bobby and the Midnites
- Released: August 1984
- Genre: Rock, country
- Label: Columbia
- Producer: Jeff Baxter

Bob Weir chronology
| Bobby and the Midnites (1981) | Where the Beat Meets the Street (1984) | Kingfish in Concert: King Biscuit Flower Hour (1996) |

Professional ratings
Review scores
| Source | Rating |
|---|---|
| AllMusic | 2/5 stars |

Where the Beat Meets the Street is the second studio album by Grateful Dead rhythm guitarist Bob Weir and his side-project, Bobby and the Midnites. The album reached number 166 on the Billboard 200.

== Track listing ==
Side one

1. "(I Want to Live in) America" (Bobby Cochran, Bob Weir, John Perry Barlow, Gerrit Graham) – 3:21
2. "Where the Beat Meets the Street" (Nicky Chinn, Steve Glen) – 3:32
3. "She's Gonna Win Your Heart" (Mentor Williams, Billy Burnette) – 3:59
4. "Ain't That Peculiar" (Smokey Robinson, Warren Moore, Marvin Tarplin, Bobby Rogers) – 3:50
5. "Lifeguard" (Dennis Lambert, Peter Beckett) – 3:52

Side two

1. "Rock in the 80's" (Cochran) – 3:10
2. "Lifeline" (Roddy, Medica, Frederiksen, Haselden) – 4:23
3. "Falling" (Jeff Baxter, Weir, Barlow, Kenny Gradney) – 4:22
4. "Thunder & Lightning" (Weir, Cochran) – 3:35
5. "Gloria Monday" (Weir, Barlow, Baxter) – 4:09

== Personnel ==
Bobby and the Midnites

- Bob Weir – guitar, lead and background vocals
- Bobby Cochran – guitar, lead and background vocals
- Dave Garland – keyboards, synthesizers, tenor and alto saxophone, background vocals
- Kenny Gradney – bass, background vocals
- Billy Cobham – drums

Additional musicians

- Jeff Baxter – guitar, synthesizers
- Paulette Brown – vocals
- Steve Cropper – guitar
- Paulinho Da Costa – percussion
- Chuck Domanico – bass
- Jim Ehinger – keyboards
- Alphonso Johnson – bass
- Sherlie Matthews – vocals
- Brian Setzer – guitar

Production

- Producer – Jeff Baxter
- Production coordinators – Marylata Elton and David Richman
- Engineer – Larold Rebhun
- Assistant engineers – John Bogosian, David Ferguson and Mark Wilczak
- Mastering – Elliot Federman
- Design & redesign – David Richman
- Photography – Glenn Wexler
- Art direction – Joel Zimmerman
- Coordination – Doug Wygal and Jamie Reamer
