= Dick's Picks Volume 31 =

Live album by Grateful Dead
- Released: March 16, 2004
- Recorded: August 4–6, 1974
- Venues: Philadelphia Civic Center, Philadelphia, PA; Roosevelt Stadium, Jersey City, NJ
- Genres: Folk rock, jam
- Length: 295:34
- Label: Grateful Dead Records

Grateful Dead chronology
The Closing of Winterland (2003)	Dick's Picks Volume 31 (2004)	Rockin' the Rhein with the Grateful Dead (2004)

Dick's Picks Volume 31 is a four-CD live album by the rock band the Grateful Dead. It was recorded on August 4 and 5, 1974 at the Philadelphia Civic Center in Philadelphia, Pennsylvania, and on August 6, 1974, at Roosevelt Stadium in Jersey City, New Jersey. It was released in March 2004.

== Critical reception ==
Professional ratings
Review scores
Source	Rating
Allmusic	4/5 stars
The Music Box	5/5 stars

On Allmusic, Lindsay Planer said, "Incrementally, this [lineup of the Grateful Dead] began distancing the band's sound from the R&B-meets-psychedelia of the Ron "Pigpen" McKernan years, as well as the more recent rural twang heard on Workingman's Dead (1970) and American Beauty (1970). Instead, their collective fusion-based explorations continually challenge the musicians, while simultaneously providing fresh extensions and visages on familiar favorites. Nowhere is this more evident than on "Playing in the Band". After introducing the number in their repertoire (circa February of 1971), they cultivated it from a fairly rote and otherwise typical rendering into an unexpurgated show-stopping centerpiece — as shown by the pair of 20-plus minute excursions on Dick's Picks Volume 31. They not only clock in at nearly half an hour apiece, but each is distinctive and examines the Grateful Dead's ability to end up at different places, despite the similarities in the point(s) of departure."

In The Music Box, John Metzger wrote, "Just days before Richard Nixon resigned his position as President of the United States to avoid impeachment, the Grateful Dead unleashed a trio of exhilarating performances in the mid-Atlantic. For certain, 1974 was a magnificent year for the band — even if it was the end of a rather disgraceful era for the country at large — for its mad-scientist amalgamation of country, rock, jazz, and blues blossomed beautifully, and although it soon would take a 20-month sabbatical from touring, its energy remained remarkably high. Indeed, the 31st edition of the esteemed Dick's Picks series culls material from the early August conclusion of the Grateful Dead's summer tour, and although it mixes and matches among the concerts to form what is essentially two shows, it does so in a seamless fashion, providing an intriguing and frequently mind-bending blast through the group's much treasured canon."

== Booklet and essay ==
The release includes a booklet made of five sheets of paper stapled together, yielding a 20-page enclosure. The front duplicates the cover of the CD and the back features a short list of "Upcoming gigs" that include the shows in Philadelphia on August 4 and 5.

Most of the booklet is a long essay from The Aquarian by Jay Saporita entitled "We used to play for silver, now we play for life", a verse from the band's song "Jack Straw". Spanning the better part of 16 pages, the essay details the several days spent setting up and performing the shows, and includes highlights from moments backstage.

The last page of the essay features a large color photograph of the Wall of sound, and the last two pages list the contents of and credits for the release.

== Caveat emptor ==
Each volume of Dick's Picks has its own "caveat emptor" label, advising the listener of the sound quality of the recording. The label for volume 31 reads:

"Dicks Picks Vol. 31 was mastered from the original 2 track analog source tapes, running at 7.5 IPS, recorded during the last American tour using the famed Wall Of Sound. Some sonic anomalies remain, particularly some over-exuberant piano-related sounds, but we have done as much as possible to bring the Wall Of Sound into your living room. Enjoy."

== Track listing ==
Disc one

August 4:

1. "Playing in the Band" (Bob Weir, Mickey Hart, Robert Hunter) – 25:50

August 5:

2. "Scarlet Begonias" (Jerry Garcia, Hunter) – 12:01

August 4:

3. "Jack Straw" (Weir, Hunter) – 5:27
4. "Peggy-O" (traditional, arr. Grateful Dead) – 6:47

August 5:

5. "Me and Bobby McGee" (Fred Foster, Kris Kristofferson) – 5:34
6. "China Cat Sunflower" (Garcia, Hunter) – 11:13 →
7. "I Know You Rider" (trad., arr. Grateful Dead) – 5:22
8. "Around and Around" (Chuck Berry) – 5:08

Disc two

August 4:

1. "Ship of Fools" (Garcia, Hunter) – 7:00
2. "Loose Lucy" (Garcia, Hunter) – 5:32
3. "Weather Report Suite" →
  - "Prelude" (Weir) – 1:20
  - "Part 1" (Weir, Eric Andersen) – 4:20
  - "Part 2: Let It Grow" (Weir, John Barlow) – 9:16
4. "Jam" (Grateful Dead) – 9:25 →
5. "Wharf Rat" (Garcia, Hunter) – 11:21 →
6. "U.S. Blues" (Garcia, Hunter) – 6:32
7. "Sugar Magnolia / Sunshine Daydream" (Weir, Hunter) – 10:42
8. "Casey Jones" (Garcia, Hunter) – 6:26

Disc three

August 5:

1. "Mississippi Half-Step Uptown Toodeloo" (Garcia, Hunter) – 8:30 →
2. "It Must Have Been the Roses" (Hunter) – 5:53
3. "Big River" (Johnny Cash) – 5:17
4. "He's Gone" (Garcia, Hunter) – 13:12 →
5. "Truckin' " (Garcia, Phil Lesh, Weir, Hunter) – 9:46 →
6. "Jam" (Grateful Dead) – 8:16 →
7. "The Other One Jam" (Weir, Bill Kreutzmann) – 2:30 →
8. "Space" (Grateful Dead) – 10:25 →
9. "Stella Blue" (Garcia, Hunter) – 9:36
10. "One More Saturday Night" (Weir) – 4:58

Disc four

August 6:

1. "Eyes of the World" (Garcia, Hunter) – 19:28
2. "Playing in the Band" (Weir, Hart, Hunter) – 22:37 →
3. "Scarlet Begonias" (Note: Contains a patch from the August 4 version) (Garcia, Hunter) – 9:25 →
4. "Playing in the Band" (Weir, Hart, Hunter) – 5:04
5. "Uncle John's Band" (Garcia, Hunter) – 10:44

== Personnel ==
Grateful Dead

- Jerry Garcia – lead guitar, vocals
- Donna Godchaux – vocals
- Keith Godchaux – piano
- Bill Kreutzmann – drums
- Phil Lesh – electric bass, vocals
- Bob Weir – rhythm guitar, vocals

Production

- Bill Candelario – recording
- Jeffrey Norman – CD mastering
- David Lemieux – tape archivist
- Eileen Law – archival research
- Robert W. Danielson Jr. – photo
- Robert Minkin – cover art & package design
- W. Keats – deadhead newsletter artwork
- Jay Saporita – booklet essay

== Set lists ==
Following are the full set lists from the August 4, 5, and 6, 1974 concerts.

Sunday, August 4

- First set: "Bertha", "Mexicali Blues", "Scarlet Begonias", "Black Throated Wind", "Deal", "Beat It On Down the Line", "Peggy-O" [*], "Jack Straw" [*], "Loser", "El Paso", "Row Jimmy", "Playing in the Band" [*]

Between sets: "Seastones" (Ned Lagin on synthesizer and electronic keyboards and Phil Lesh on bass)

- Second set: "Ship of Fools" [*], "Big River", "Loose Lucy" [*], "Me and My Uncle", "It Must Have Been the Roses", "Weather Report Suite" [*] > "Jam" [*] > "Wharf Rat" [*] > "U.S. Blues" [*], "Sugar Magnolia" [*]
- Encore: "Casey Jones" [*]

Monday, August 5

- First set: "Promised Land", "Brown Eyed Women", "Beat It On Down the Line", "Dire Wolf", "Me and Bobby McGee" [*], "Tennessee Jed", "Jack Straw", "Deal", "El Paso", "China Cat Sunflower" [*] > "I Know You Rider" [*], "Around and Around" [*]

Between sets: "Seastones" (Ned Lagin on synthesizer and electronic keyboards and Phil Lesh on bass)

- Second set: "Mississippi Half-Step Uptown Toodeloo" [*] > "It Must Have Been the Roses" [*], "Big River" [*], "Ramble On Rose", "Me and My Uncle", "Scarlet Begonias" [*], "He's Gone" [*] > "Truckin'" [*] > "Jam" [*] > "The Other One Jam" [*] > "Space" [*] > "Stella Blue" [*], "One More Saturday Night" [*]
- Encore: "U.S. Blues"

Tuesday, August 6

- First set: "Bertha", "Mexicali Blues", "Don't Ease Me In", "Beat It On Down the Line", "Sugaree", "Jack Straw", "Eyes of the World" [*], "Promised Land", "Deal", "Playing in the Band" [*] > "Scarlet Begonias" [*] > "Playing in the Band" [*]

Between sets: "Seastones" (Ned Lagin on synthesizer and electronic keyboards and Phil Lesh on bass)

- Second set: "Uncle John's Band" [*], "Black Peter", "El Paso", "Loose Lucy", "Big River", "Ship of Fools", "Me and My Uncle", "Row Jimmy", "Sugar Magnolia" > "He's Gone" > "Truckin'" > "Spanish Jam" > "The Other One" > "Goin' Down the Road Feeling Bad" > "Sunshine Daydream"
- Encore: "U.S. Blues"

[*] Included in Dick's Picks Volume 31
