= Dick's Picks Volume 30 =

Live album by Grateful Dead
- Released: October 30, 2003
- Recorded: March 25 and 28, 1972
- Genres: Folk rock Psychedelic rock Jam
- Length: 265:34
- Label: Grateful Dead Records

Grateful Dead chronology
The Very Best of Grateful Dead (2003)	Dick's Picks Volume 30 (2003)	The Closing of Winterland (2003)

Professional ratings
Review scores
Source	Rating
Allmusic	4.5/5 stars
The Music Box	4/5 stars

Dick's Picks Volume 30 is a four-CD live album by the rock band the Grateful Dead. Just prior to their Europe '72 tour, the Grateful Dead played seven shows at the Academy of Music on 14th Street in New York City. Included in this album is the entire March 28, 1972 performance plus selections from March 25, 1972, and March 27, 1972. The March 25 show (a semi-private party booked by the Hell's Angels and billed as "Jerry Garcia & Friends") featured Bo Diddley as a guest, whose performance, backed by the Grateful Dead, is included in Disc One. Other rarities contained in this volume are the only Grateful Dead live performances of "How Sweet It Is (To Be Loved by You)", "Are You Lonely for Me" and "The Sidewalks of New York" (played as a brief, instrumental tuning before the encore).

Additional selections from the venue run were later released on the Rockin' the Rhein bonus disc, and on Dave's Picks Volume 14, the latter including the March 26, 1972 performance in its entirety along with additional tracks from the March 27 performance on a separate bonus disc.

The audio tape almost did not make it into the vault as it was not known to have been recorded. It was found in an old barn and restored by Rob Eaton in 1995.

== Enclosure and articles ==
The release includes two sheets of paper stapled together in the middle, yielding an eight-page enclosure. The front duplicates the cover of the CD and the back is a mostly blank, textured grey that matches the background of the front.

The first two pages inside feature a photograph of the Academy of Music marquee announcing "Howard Stein presents Grateful Dead". The middle two pages feature two newspaper articles about the run of shows, and the last two pages list the contents of and credits for the release.

=== Article in the Daily News ===
The newspaper clipping on the left side of the middle two pages is from the Daily News, is entitled "Winging through the night", dated March 30, 1972, and was written by Ernest Leogrande.

After setting the scene and explaining, among other things, that "the Dead apparently like to play to exhaustion", the author writes that "The Saturday night concert was a benefit for the Hell's Angels, some of whose members had been arrested on charges requiring high bail." Leogrande goes on to explain the relationship between the band and the motorcycle club, mentioning "Sandy Alexander, president of the New York Hells Angels" specifically. Much of the second half of the article is about the "mutual admiration" Jerry Garcia and Sandy Alexander have for one another. For example, Ernest quotes Jerry as saying "Sandy is a good cat" and quotes Sandy as saying "Jerry is one of the most beautiful persons in the industry because he plays with all his heart for the people".

Leogrande closes his piece by noting the concert was peaceful, the policemen present were "bored by inaction", and the "greatest hazard" was "getting yourself lashed across the face by some teenage chick's wildly swinging pendulum of hair."

=== Article in the New York Times ===
The newspaper clipping on the right side of the middle two pages is from The New York Times, is entitled "Grateful Dead, in concert, retain their magic glow", and was written by Don Heckman.

After briefly describing the band's background and connection with its fan base, the author focuses on the band's overall sound, and Jerry Garcia's influences in particular. He traces these influences to "the early jazz of Django Reinhardt" and bands "of the sort that guitarist Tiny Grimes used to lead", claiming that "the vocals are less important than the overall flow of the music."

Heckman closes his piece with a section entitled "Updated jump band", a reference to "the initial stimulus for the black rhythm and blues music of the late 1940s and 1950s". Asking rhetorically whether the band represents the start or "simply the close of a long cycle?" the article ends on a dark note, suggesting that "The Grateful Dead may have chosen a more prophetic name than they realized."

== Track listing ==
Disc one

March 25 – first set:

1. "Hey Bo Diddley" (with Bo Diddley) (Diddley) – 4:10 (Note: Listed incorrectly on the release as "Hey! Bo Diddley". The track is actually "Bo Diddley", a different song) →
2. "I'm a Man (Mannish Boy)" (with Bo Diddley) (Diddley) – 6:00 →
3. "I've Seen Them All" (with Bo Diddley) (Diddley) – 7:43 →
4. "Jam" (with Bo Diddley) (Diddley, Grateful Dead) – 9:59
5. "Mona" (with Bo Diddley) (Diddley) – 3:34

March 25 – second set:

6. "How Sweet It Is (To Be Loved By You)" (Brian Holland, Lamont Dozier, Eddie Holland) – 7:56
7. "Are You Lonely For Me" (Bert Berns) – 7:37
8. "Smokestack Lightnin' " (Howlin' Wolf) – 13:11

March 27 – first set:

9. "Playing in the Band" (Robert Hunter, Mickey Hart, Bob Weir) – 11:10

Note

Disc two

March 28 – first set:

1. "Truckin' " (Hunter, Jerry Garcia, Phil Lesh, Weir) – 9:49
2. "Tennessee Jed" (Hunter, Garcia) – 7:45
3. "Chinatown Shuffle" (Pigpen) – 3:10
4. "Black-Throated Wind" (John Barlow, Weir) – 6:48
5. "You Win Again" (Hank Williams) – 5:09
6. "Mr. Charlie" (Hunter, Pigpen) – 5:02
7. "Mexicali Blues" (Barlow, Weir) – 4:37
8. "Brokedown Palace" (Hunter, Garcia) – 6:13
9. "Next Time You See Me" (Frank Forest, William G. Harvey) – 4:52
10. "Cumberland Blues" (Hunter, Garcia, Lesh) – 6:09

Disc three

March 28 – first set, continued:

1. "Looks Like Rain" (Barlow, Weir) – 8:06
2. "Big Railroad Blues" (Noah Lewis) – 4:09
3. "El Paso" (Marty Robbins) – 5:25
4. "China Cat Sunflower" (Hunter, Garcia) – 5:05 →
5. "I Know You Rider" (traditional, arr. Grateful Dead) – 6:27
6. "Casey Jones" (Hunter, Garcia) – 6:43

March 28 – second set:

7. "Playing in the Band" (Hunter, Hart, Weir) – 13:56
8. "Sugaree" (Hunter, Garcia) – 7:36
9. "The Stranger (Two Souls in Communion)" (Pigpen) – 8:58

Disc four

March 28 – second set, continued:

1. "Sugar Magnolia" (Hunter, Weir) – 6:55 →
2. "The Other One" (Bill Kreutzmann, Weir) – 28:16
3. "It Hurts Me Too" (Elmore James) – 9:23
4. "Not Fade Away" (Buddy Holly, Norman Petty) – 5:26 →
5. "Goin' Down the Road Feelin' Bad" (trad., arr. Grateful Dead) – 8:20 →
6. "Not Fade Away" (Holly, Petty) – 3:35

March 28 – encore:

7. "Sidewalks of New York" (James W. Blake, Charles B. Lawlor) – 1:10 →
8. "One More Saturday Night" (Weir) – 4:43

== Personnel ==
=== Grateful Dead ===
- Jerry Garcia – guitar, vocals
- Donna Godchaux – vocals
- Keith Godchaux – piano
- Bill Kreutzmann – drums
- Phil Lesh – electric bass, vocals
- Ron 'Pigpen' McKernan – harmonica, organ, percussion, vocals
- Bob Weir – guitar, vocals

=== Additional musician ===
- Bo Diddley – guitar, vocals on disc 1 tracks 1–5

=== Production ===
- Betty Cantor-Jackson – recording
- Jeffrey Norman – CD mastering
- David Lemieux – tape archivist
- Eileen Law – archival research
- Robert Minkin – cover art, package design, photography

== See also ==
- Dave's Picks Volume 14 - Recorded on March 26, 1972, also at the Academy of Music.
