= Dick's Picks Volume 32 =

Live album by Grateful Dead
- Released: July 20, 2004
- Recorded: August 7, 1982
- Genre: Rock
- Length: 156:40
- Label: Grateful Dead Records

Grateful Dead chronology
Rockin' the Rhein with the Grateful Dead (2004)	Dick's Picks Volume 32 (2004)	Beyond Description (1973–1989) (2004)

Dick's Picks Volume 32 is a two-CD live album by the rock band the Grateful Dead. It was recorded on August 7, 1982 at the Alpine Valley Music Theatre in East Troy, Wisconsin. It was released on July 20, 2004.

Alpine Valley, an outdoor theater in the rural, southeastern part of the state, was well known among Deadheads of the era. 1982 was the first year that the band played multiple days at the venue. It is also the site of the Grateful Dead concert video Downhill From Here.

== Critical reception ==
Professional ratings
Review scores
Source	Rating
Allmusic	4/5 stars
The Music Box	3/5 stars

On AllMusic Lindsay Planer said, "By some accounts, early-'80 shows could often be accurately classified as hit-or-miss affairs; on this evening the Grateful Dead are particularly inspired throughout.... Even though this volume was mastered from a cassette tape, the powerful performance far outweighs any audible sonic anomalies."

In The Music Box John Metzger wrote, "...the two-disc collection offers a time capsule of sorts to the group's most avid fans... For them, the notion that it also features some rather explosive music, particularly during its latter half, is reward enough for enduring a few of the bumpier moments contained within the show."

== Enclosure and review ==
The release includes two sheets of paper stapled together in the middle, yielding an eight-page enclosure that slides out of the case, allowing the front of it to serve as the cover of the CD. The back is a mirror image of the cover's background.

The first two pages feature a large black-and-white photograph of the band playing on stage. The left side of the middle two pages features a short newspaper clipping of a review of the show, and the right side features a color photograph taken in daylight of the crowd at the show with the band playing on stage in the background. The next-to-last page shows a similar scene that reveals less of the crowd and more of the woods behind the stage, and the last page lists the contents of and credits for the release.

=== Review ===
The newspaper clipping contains a short review from the Milwaukee Journal Sentinel. It was written by Divina Infusino, is dated August 8, 1982, and entitled "Grateful Dead re-enact ritual for 20,000 fans."

True to its title, the article describes the scene as reminiscent of prior shows performed by the "17-year-old" band who "represent more innocent times, when spontaneity replaced structure as a guideline". Infusino expresses her mixed feelings about the result, writing that "the Dead let its sound take its course and unfold at will" resulting in "a three-hour show that was sometimes delightful and in other parts laborious."

Infusino closes her piece by observing that "The audience never minded the dull moments, nor did it object that the band refrained from performing its best known numbers, like 'Sugar Magnolia' and 'Truckin'.' "

== Caveat emptor ==
Each volume of Dick's Picks has its own "caveat emptor" label, advising the listener of the sound quality of the recording. The one for volume 32 reads:

By now, after 11 years and 31 previous volumes of Dick's Picks, most of you ignore these dire audio warnings. Therefore, every once in a while I need to remind you of the inherent problems of some of our music sources. The master for Alpine 8-7-82, is a cassette... yes, the lowly, forgotten cassette. It is quite well preserved, but it is a sonically limited cassette none-the-less. In addition to that, because of overriding considerations at the time of the show, this mix is bass instrument shy. That being said, this is a great show, and that's the foremost DP consideration, right? So, let the music and performance jump out and grab you, and enjoy! - Love, JN

== Track listing ==
Disc One
First set:

1. "The Music Never Stopped" → (Bob Weir, John Barlow) – 4:19
2. "Sugaree" → (Jerry Garcia, Robert Hunter) – 9:51
3. "The Music Never Stopped" (Weir, Barlow) – 4:00
4. "Me and My Uncle" → (John Phillips) – 3:02
5. "Big River" (Johnny Cash) – 6:12
6. "It Must Have Been the Roses" (Hunter) – 5:51
7. "C.C. Rider" (Trad. arr. by Grateful Dead) – 7:34
8. "Ramble on Rose" (Garcia, Hunter) – 7:31
9. "Beat It on Down the Line" → (Jesse Fuller) – 3:11
10. "On the Road Again" (Trad. arr. by Grateful Dead) – 3:04
11. "Althea" (Garcia, Hunter) – 7:56
12. "Let It Grow" (Weir, Barlow) – 11:39

Encore:

13. "U.S. Blues" (Garcia, Hunter) – 5:16

Disc Two
Second set:

1. "China Cat Sunflower" (Garcia, Hunter) – 6:42
2. "I Know You Rider" (Trad. arr. by Grateful Dead) – 7:43
3. "Man Smart, Woman Smarter" (Span) – 8:29
4. "Ship of Fools" (Garcia, Hunter) – 6:39
5. "Playing in the Band" → (Weir, Mickey Hart, Hunter) – 11:15
6. "Drums" → (Hart, Bill Kreutzmann) – 5:31 (Note: Edited version of performance)
7. "Space" → (Garcia, Phil Lesh, Weir) – 5:31
8. "The Wheel" → (Garcia, Kreutzmann, Hunter) – 5:51
9. "Playing in the Band" → (Weir, Mickey Hart, Hunter) – 4:09
10. "Morning Dew" → (Bonnie Dobson, Tim Rose) – 10:11
11. "One More Saturday Night" (Weir) – 4:59

== Personnel ==
Grateful Dead

- Jerry Garcia – lead guitar, vocals
- Mickey Hart – drums
- Bill Kreutzmann – drums
- Phil Lesh – electric bass
- Brent Mydland – keyboards, vocals
- Bob Weir – rhythm guitar, vocals

Production

- Dan Healy – recording
- Jeffrey Norman – CD mastering
- David Lemieux – tape archivist
- Eileen Law – archival research
- Robert Minkin – photography, cover art and package design
- Bill Turley – photography
