= Dave's Picks Volume 15 =

Live album by Grateful Dead
- Released: August 1, 2015
- Recorded: April 22, 1978
- Genre: Rock
- Length: 164:14
- Label: Rhino
- Producer: Grateful Dead

Grateful Dead chronology
Dave's Picks Volume 14 (2015)	Dave's Picks Volume 15 (2015)	30 Trips Around the Sun: The Definitive Live Story 1965–1995 (2015)

Dave's Picks Volume 15 is a three-CD live album by the rock band the Grateful Dead. It contains the complete concert recorded on April 22, 1978 at the Municipal Auditorium in Nashville, Tennessee. It was released on August 1, 2015 as a limited edition of 16,500 numbered copies.

One track from the previous concert of the tour ("Stella Blue"), in Lexington, Kentucky, on April 21, 1978, had been released on So Many Roads. The following concert date of the tour (April 24, 1978, Illinois State University) had been released as Dave's Picks Volume 7.

== Critical reception ==
Stephen Thomas Erlewine, writing on AllMusic, said, "In his brief liner notes for his 15th pick, historian/vaultmaster Dave Lemieux claims April 24, 1978 as the dividing point between the tightly honed 1977 Dead and the looser 1978 Dead. That April 24 concert at Normal's Illinois State University saw release in 2013 as the seventh Dave's Pick, but this 2015 release captures a show at Nashville Municipal Auditorium from just two days earlier, so it follows that the Dead are in similarly fine form.... All and all, it's a really good, surprisingly energetic show."

== Track listing ==
Disc 1
First set:

1. "Bertha" > (Jerry Garcia, Robert Hunter) – 7:27
2. "Good Lovin'" (Arthur Resnick, Rudy Clark) – 6:48
3. "Candyman" (Garcia, Hunter) – 7:26
4. "Looks Like Rain" (Bob Weir, John Barlow) – 8:16
5. "Tennessee Jed" (Garcia, Hunter) – 9:33
6. "Jack Straw" (Weir, Hunter) – 6:12
7. "Peggy-O" (traditional, arranged by Grateful Dead) – 8:16
8. "New Minglewood Blues" (traditional, arranged by Grateful Dead) – 6:12
9. "Deal" (Garcia, Hunter) – 7:24

Disc 2
Second set:

1. "Lazy Lightning" > (Weir, Barlow) – 3:38
2. "Supplication" (Weir, Barlow) – 6:42
3. "It Must Have Been the Roses" (Hunter) – 8:22
4. "Estimated Prophet" > (Weir, Barlow) – 12:36
5. "Eyes of the World" > (Garcia, Hunter) – 12:25
6. "Rhythm Devils" > (Mickey Hart, Bill Kreutzmann) – 14:09

Disc 3

1. "Not Fade Away" > (Norman Petty, Charles Hardin) – 11:20
2. "Wharf Rat" > (Garcia, Hunter) – 12:06
3. "Sugar Magnolia" (Weir, Hunter) – 10:07

Encore:

4. "One More Saturday Night" (Weir) – 5:12

== Personnel ==
Grateful Dead

- Jerry Garcia – guitar, vocals
- Donna Jean Godchaux – vocals
- Keith Godchaux – keyboards
- Mickey Hart – drums, percussion
- Bill Kreutzmann – drums, percussion
- Phil Lesh – bass, vocals
- Bob Weir – guitar, vocals

Production

- Produced by Grateful Dead
- Produced for release by David Lemieux
- Executive producer: Mark Pinkus
- Associate producers: Doran Tyson, Ivette Ramos
- CD mastering: Jeffrey Norman
- Recording: Betty Cantor-Jackson
- Art direction, design: Steve Vance
- Cover art: Micah Nelson
- Photos: James R. Anderson
- Tape research: Michael Wesley Johnson
- Archival research: Nicholas Meriwether
- Liner notes: David Lemieux
