= Live 'n' Kickin' (Kingfish album) =

1977 live album by Kingfish

Live album by Kingfish
- Released: 1977
- Recorded: 1976
- Venue: The Roxy, West Hollywood
- Genre: Rock
- Label: Jet Records (United Artists)
- Producer: Matthew Kelly; Dave Torbert

Kingfish chronology
Kingfish (1976)	Live 'n' Kickin' (1977)	Trident (1978)

Bob Weir chronology
Kingfish (1976)	Live 'n' Kickin' (1977)	Heaven Help the Fool (1978)

Professional ratings
Review scores
Source	Rating
AllMusic	3/5 stars

Live 'n' Kickin' is the second album by the rock group Kingfish. It was recorded live at the Roxy in West Hollywood, California. It was released as an LP in 1977 by Jet Records. It was released on CD in Germany in 1989.

Though guitarist Bob Weir played with the band during the performance, he had returned to playing full time with the Grateful Dead by the time the album was produced. With the goal of forging a separate identity for Kingfish, tracks containing Weir's playing and singing were therefore removed from the mix, except where absolutely crucial to continuity or where his guitar or vocals bled onto the drum track.

== Track listing ==
Side one

1. "Good-Bye Yer Honor" (Dave Torbert, Tim Hovey, Matthew Kelly) – 2:47
2. "Juke" (Walter Jacobs) – 2:29
3. "Mule Skinner Blues" (George Vaughn, Jimmie Rodgers) – 4:24
4. "I Hear You Knockin'" (Pearl King, Dave Bartholomew) – 4:16
5. "Hypnotize" (Kelly, Torbert) – 5:40

Side two

1. "Jump for Joy" (John Carter, Tim Gilbert) – 3:32
2. "Overnight Bag" (Carter, Gilbert) – 3:47
3. "Jump Back" (Rufus Thomas) – 3:47
4. "Shake and Fingerpop" (Autry DeWalt, Lawrence Horn, Willie Woods) – 3:51
5. "Around and Around" (Chuck Berry) – 5:16

== Personnel ==
Kingfish

- Dave Torbert – lead vocals, bass guitar
- Matthew Kelly – guitar, harmonica, vocals
- Robbie Hoddinott – lead guitar
- Chris Herold – drums, percussion
- Bob Weir – guitar, vocals; lead vocals on "Mule Skinner Blues", "Around and Around"

Production

- Produced by Matthew Kelly, Dave Torbert
- Executive producer: Robert Gregory Nelson
- Recording, mixing: Ray Thompson, Mike Carver
- Recording engineer: Tim Hovey
- Technical assistance: Rob Taylor
- Mastering: Paul Stubblebine
- Photography: Gary Regester, Julie Bennett, Frank Moffett
