= Bobby and the Midnites =

American rock group (1980–1984)

- Bobby and the Midnites in 1981. (Back L-R: Billy Cobham, Bobby Cochran, Matthew Kelly. Front L-R: Brent Mydland, Bob Weir, Alphonso Johnson)

Background information
- Origin: San Francisco, California
- Genres: Rock
- Years active: 1980–1984
- Labels: Arista, Columbia
- Spinoff of: Grateful Dead
- Past members: Bob Weir; Bobby Cochran; Matthew Kelly; Brent Mydland; Tim Bogert; Carmine Appice; Dave Garland; Alphonso Johnson; Billy Cobham; Kenny Gradney

Bobby and the Midnites was a rock group led by Bob Weir of the Grateful Dead. The band was Weir's main side project during the first half of the 1980s. They released two albums, but were better known for their live concerts than for their work in the recording studio. With a rhythm section that included jazz veterans Billy Cobham and, for a time, Alphonso Johnson, Bobby and the Midnites played rock music that was influenced by jazz-rock fusion.

== History of the band ==
Ibanez representative Jeff Hasselberger put together a group for the 1979 NAMM show billed as the "Ibanez Tama All-Star Band" featuring Ibanez and Tama endorsing artists Bob Weir, Bobby Cochran, Billy Cobham, Alphonso Johnson, and Steve Miller. The performances were a success and the lineup, sans Steve Miller, provided the genesis of Bobby and the Midnites. The name Bobby and the Midnites was chosen because the band had two "Bobby" singer-songwriters, and as a nod to Bobby Cochran's former band Thee Midniters, which had been very popular in East L.A.

In 1978, Bob Weir had led a side project called the Bob Weir Band that played a number of concerts. Besides Weir himself, two members of the Bob Weir Band were in Bobby and the Midnites. One was guitarist and singer Bobby Cochran (Eddie Cochran's nephew), formerly of Steppenwolf. The other was keyboardist and singer Brent Mydland, who in the interim had joined the Grateful Dead. Matthew Kelly was another "Midnite" who had already played in a band with Weir — Kingfish, which Kelly and Dave Torbert had founded in 1973, and which Weir had played in full-time from 1974 to 1976. Kelly played guitar, harmonica, and congas. Tim Bogert and Carmine Appice, who had previously been in Vanilla Fudge and Beck, Bogert & Appice, were recruited to play bass guitar and drums for the initial shows.

The first Bobby and the Midnites concert was at the Golden Bear, in Huntington Beach, California, on June 30, 1980. The band played a number of live dates from mid-1980 to early 1981. Then Alphonso Johnson replaced Bogert on bass and Billy Cobham replaced Carmine Appice on drums. Johnson had been in Weather Report, and had played with Cobham in the CBS All-Stars. Cobham, a highly regarded jazz and fusion musician had played with Miles Davis and the Mahavishnu Orchestra, among others. This slightly revised configuration of Bobby and the Midnites recaptured the magic of the initial NAMM shows, and recorded the band's self-titled first album.

The Midnites did not play live again until the following year. Brent Mydland and Matthew Kelly had left the lineup, and Dave Garland had joined. Garland sang and played keyboards and saxophone. Starting in January 1982, this group toured extensively when the Grateful Dead were not on the road. A 60-minute concert video of this Midnites lineup was released on VHS in 1991.

On November 27, 1982, Bobby and the Midnites performed in Montego Bay at the Jamaica World Music Festival. They were one of many acts, including the Grateful Dead, the Clash, the B-52's, the English Beat, Ziggy Marley and the Melody Makers, Toots & the Maytals, Peter Tosh, and Aretha Franklin. The Midnites' set occurred after midnight of November 26, in the early hours of November 27. They played songs such as "Man Smart, Woman Smarter", "Heaven Help The Fool", "Thunder and Lighting", and "Book of Rules". Billy Cobham was given an introduction by the festival MC, and took an extended drum solo leading into "Josephine".

In March 1983, the band had its final change of personnel, when Kenny Gradney, formerly of Little Feat, replaced Johnson on bass. The band continued touring, playing many live dates, and in 1984 released a second studio album. The last Bobby and the Midnites concert was at the Rio, in Valley Stream, New York, on September 30, 1984.

== Discography ==
=== Albums ===
- Bobby and the Midnites (1981)
- Where the Beat Meets the Street (1984)

=== Single ===
- "Too Many Losers" / "Haze" (1981)

=== Concert video ===
- Bobby and the Midnites (1991)

== Personnel ==
Following are the lineups for Bobby and the Midnites' live performances.

June 30, 1980 – January 31, 1981	Bob Weir - guitar, vocals; Bobby Cochran - guitar, vocals; Matthew Kelly - guitar, harmonica, congas; Brent Mydland - keyboards, vocals; Tim Bogert - bass; Carmine Appice - drums
January 12, 1982 – March 10, 1983	Bob Weir - guitar, vocals; Bobby Cochran - guitar, vocals; Dave Garland - keyboards, tenor saxophone, vocals; Alphonso Johnson - bass; Billy Cobham - drums
March 22, 1983 – September 30, 1984	Bob Weir - guitar, vocals; Bobby Cochran - guitar, vocals; Dave Garland - keyboards, tenor saxophone, vocals; Kenny Gradney - bass; Billy Cobham - drums
