= Matthew Kelly (musician) =

American musician, singer, and songwriter

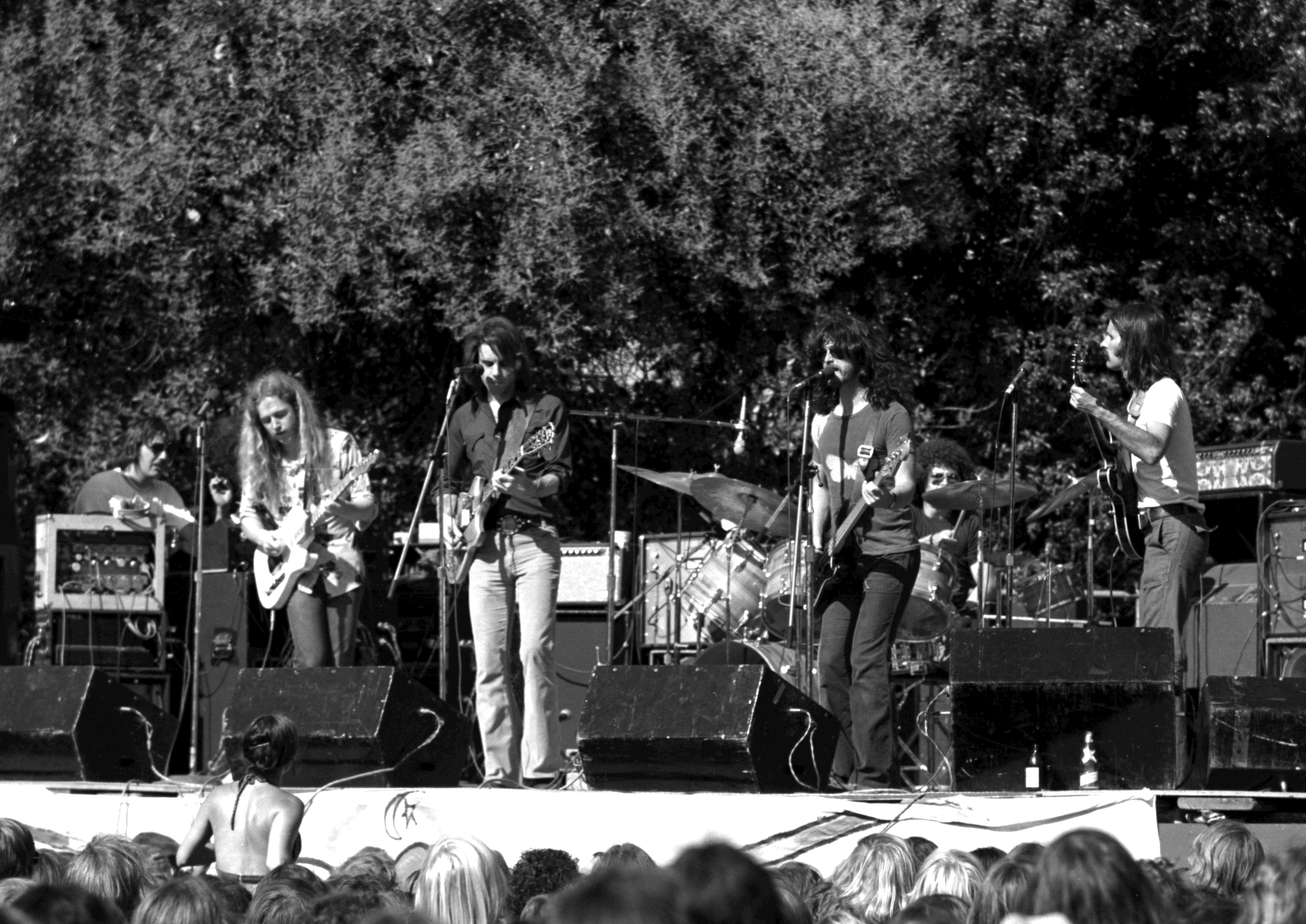
- The band Kingfish in 1975. Left to right: Barry Flast, Robbie Hoddinott, Bob Weir, Dave Torbert, Chris Herold, Matt Kelly

Background information
- Also known as: Matt Kelly
- Origin: San Francisco Bay Area
- Genres: Rock; Blues
- Instrument(s): Guitar; Harmonica

Matthew Kelly, also known as Matt Kelly, is an American musician, singer, and songwriter. He plays guitar and harmonica. Kelly is best known for being the leader of the rock band Kingfish, and for his association with Bob Weir and the Grateful Dead.

== Career ==
Matthew Kelly began his musical career in the late 1960s, playing harmonica with some well-known blues artists, including Mel Brown, Champion Jack Dupree, Johnny Lee Hooker, and T-Bone Walker.

During this period, Kelly was also involved in the burgeoning rock music scene in the San Francisco Bay Area. He played electric guitar and harmonica in several different psychedelic rock bands, along with fellow South Bay musicians Dave Torbert and Chris Herold.

Subsequently, Kelly lived in England for a number of months, and was a member of the rock band Gospel Oak. Upon his return to California, he renewed his association with Dave Torbert, who was then playing bass in the New Riders of the Purple Sage. Kelly would also sometimes hang out with a boyhood friend of his, Bob Weir of the Grateful Dead. During this period Kelly occasionally performed as a guest musician with the New Riders or the Dead. He appeared on one track of the 1973 Dead album Wake of the Flood.

In 1973, Torbert left the New Riders of the Purple Sage, and he and Kelly formed the band Kingfish, along with Chris Herold, Robbie Hoddinott, and Mick Ward. In 1974, the Grateful Dead went on hiatus, and Weir became a full-time member of Kingfish, recording and performing with the band extensively. In 1976, the Dead started touring again, and Weir left Kingfish. Kingfish continued playing many live dates, occasionally with Weir in the lineup, and released several more albums. In 1978, Kelly played on a few tracks of the Grateful Dead album Shakedown Street. He also played on several songs at the December 31, 1978 Dead show that was later released on CD and DVD as The Closing of Winterland.

Kingfish disbanded, for a time, in 1980. In 1981, Kelly became one of the original members of Bob Weir's band Bobby and the Midnites, and appeared on the band's self-titled first album, along with Brent Mydland, Billy Cobham, Alphonso Johnson, and Bobby Cochran. In 1983, Dave Torbert died. The following year, Matt Kelly reformed Kingfish. From that time on, Kelly led a gradually evolving lineup of musicians, as Kingfish intermittently toured and released live albums. In 1987, Kelly also released a solo album, A Wing and a Prayer.

In 1995, Bob Weir formed a new band, Ratdog. Kelly was an original member of that band, along with Rob Wasserman and Jay Lane. Kelly played guitar and harmonica in Ratdog until 1998.

The intermittent existence of Kingfish, led by Matthew Kelly, continues to the present time. In 1999, the band released a studio album, Sundown on the Forest. They have also released a number of live albums of older material.

== Selected discography ==
- I'd Rather Suck My Thumb – Mel Brown (1969)
- Horses – Horses (1969)
- Gospel Oak – Gospel Oak (1970)
- Wake of the Flood – Grateful Dead (1973)
- Kingfish – Kingfish (1976)
- Come to Me – Juice Newton (1977)
- Live 'n' Kickin' – Kingfish (1977)
- Trident – Kingfish (1978)
- Shakedown Street – Grateful Dead (1978)
- Bobby and the Midnites – Bobby and the Midnites (1981)
- Kingfish – Kingfish (1985)
- Alive in Eighty Five – Kingfish (1985)
- A Wing and a Prayer – Matthew Kelly (1987)
- Kingfish in Concert: King Biscuit Flower Hour – Kingfish (1996)
- Relix's Best of Kingfish – Kingfish (1997)
- Sundown on the Forest – Kingfish (1999)
- Evening Moods – Ratdog (2000)
- The Closing of Winterland – Grateful Dead (2003)
