= Palladium (New York City) =

Concert hall and nightclub

Coordinates: 40°43′59.92″N 73°59′17.36″W

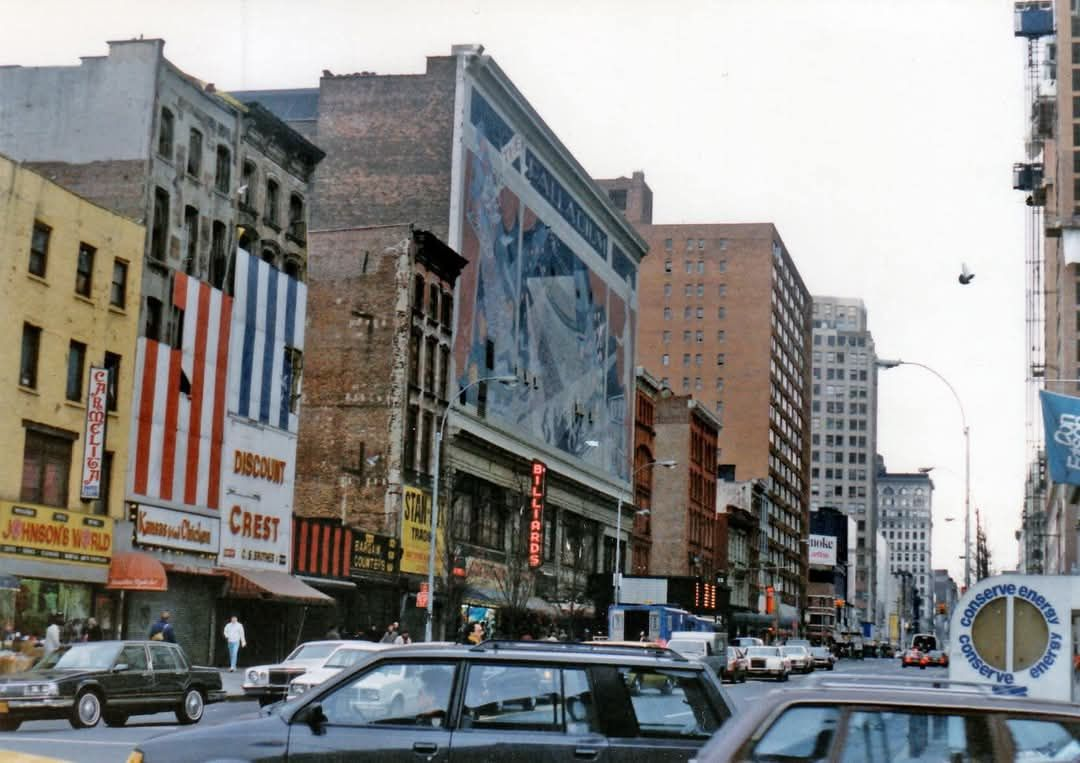
- The Palladium is the large building with a mosaic mural and neon sign in this 1987 view of 14th Street.
- Interactive map of the Palladium area
- Former names: Academy of Music (1927–1976)

General information
- Type: Movie palace, concert hall, nightclub
- Location: 126 East 14th Street, New York City, United States
- Opened: 1927
- Closed: August 1997
- Demolished: August 1998

Other information
- Seating capacity: 3,400

The Palladium (originally called the Academy of Music) was a movie theatre, concert hall, and finally a nightclub in New York City. It was located on the south side of East 14th Street, between Irving Place and Third Avenue.

Designed by Thomas W. Lamb, it was built in 1927 across the street from the site of the original Academy of Music established by financier Moses H. Grinnell in 1852. Opened as a deluxe movie palace by movie mogul William Fox, founder of the Fox Film, the academy operated as a cinema through the early 1970s.

Beginning in the 1960s, it was also utilized as a rock concert venue, particularly following the June 1971 closure of the Fillmore East. It was rechristened the Palladium in September 1976, and continued to serve as a concert hall operated by Ron Delsener until 1982.

In 1985, the Palladium was converted into a nightclub by Steve Rubell and Ian Schrager, after their success with Studio 54. Japanese architect Arata Isozaki redesigned the building's interior for the club. Peter Gatien owned and operated the club from 1992 until 1997.

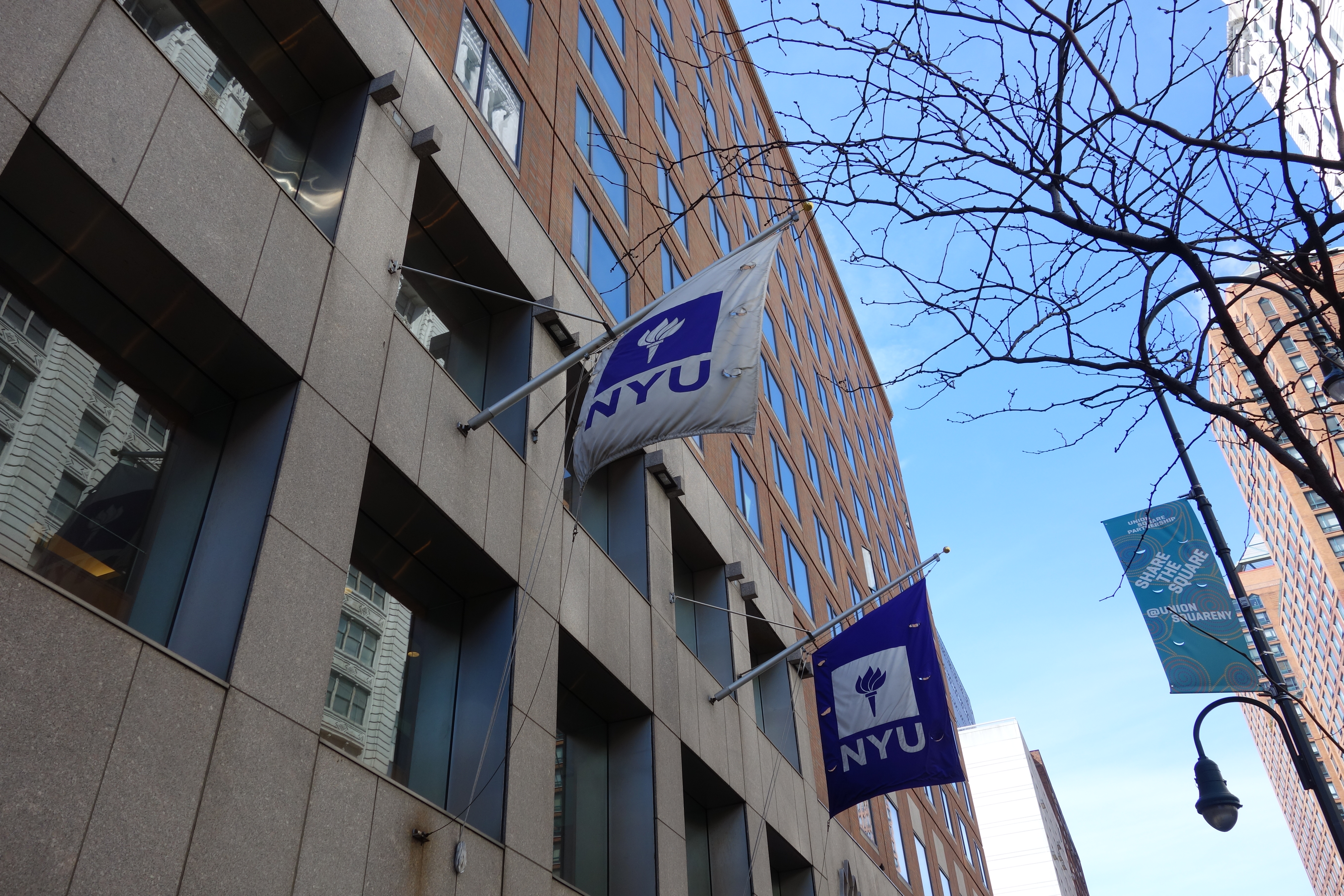
Palladium Hall in 2018, located on the former site of the Palladium

The Palladium closed in August 1997 following its purchase by New York University. In August 1998, the building was demolished in order to build a twelve-story residence hall that students affectionately referred to as Palladium Hall. The residence hall typically houses 960 residents, primarily sophomores with approximately 120 MBA students. Two floors in the basement and sub-basement house the Palladium Athletic Facility.

== History ==
=== The Academy of Music ===
The Academy of Music opened as a movie palace at 126 East 14th Street. By the 1970s it had become a music venue for rock and roll acts. Seating 3,400, it was popular with both mainstream bands and upcoming acts which could open a major bill. Many bands performed at the venue in the middle of large arena and stadium tours, due to the prestige of the theater and the excellent acoustics. The sound systems used for shows were by local rental companies when the touring acts did not carry their own.

Among the numerous rock concerts the Academy of Music hosted were the Rolling Stones, which played this venue on May 1, 1965 (and returned on June 19, 1978, when it was the Palladium), the Allman Brothers Band on August 15, 1971, Aerosmith's first concerts outside of New England, opening for Humble Pie and Edgar Winter's White Trash on December 2 & 3, 1971, and the series of New Year's shows played by the Band on December 28–31, 1971 (recordings from which were released as the 1972 live album Rock of Ages). New Year's Eve 1973 featured the eclectic line-up of Blue Öyster Cult, Iggy Pop, Teenage Lust (which had recently backed up John Lennon) and Kiss. Genesis performed their NY concerts of The Lamb Lies Down on Broadway there in 1974. Renaissance performed there on May 17, 1974; the show featured Andy Powell of Wishbone Ash on guitar, and bootleg recordings are widely available.

The Grateful Dead played two extended stands at this venue. One was seven shows at the Academy of Music, from March 21–28, 1972. Excerpts of these shows, including some tracks with Bo Diddley as a guest, were officially released on Dick's Picks Volume 30 and Dave's Picks Volume 14. The other was 5 shows between April 29 and May 4, 1977. The complete April 30 show was officially released as Grateful Dead Download Series Volume 1, with 3 bonus tracks from the April 29 show. The complete May 3 show was officially released as Dave's Picks Volume 50, with 5 bonus tracks from the May 4 show, and an additional 7 tracks from the May 4 show on the Dave's Picks 2024 Bonus Disc. The Jerry Garcia played shows there on November 27, 1977 and February 11 and November 10, 1981 and 1981 and Garcia's acoustic duo with John Kahn performed on June 25, 1982.

=== The Palladium theater ===
The Palladium, formerly known as the Academy of Music, was reopened by concert promoter Ron Delsener in September 1976 following an extensive refurbishment that updated its facilities and improved its reputation after years of decline. Its inaugural program featured a live, radio-broadcast performance by The Band, signaling the building's renewed ambition to serve as a major rock-concert venue. The renovation marked a turning point in the site's history, restoring its status as a significant New York performance space.

Bruce Springsteen & the E Street Band played six shows at the Palladium in October and November 1976, and three more in September 1978. Tickets for all three 1978 shows were sold out.

Frank Zappa and his band performed on and around Halloween several times, including performances in 1977, which were included in the film Baby Snakes, a legendary series of shows in 1978, and a 1981 performance which was simulcast live on radio and MTV.

New York proto-punk musicians The Patti Smith Group, John Cale, and Television, performed at the Palladium on New Year's Eve 1976. The Bay City Rollers performed at the Palladium on January 8, 1977. A performance of the Ramones was recorded at the Palladium on January 7, 1978; and they returned for New Year's Eve 1979.

Blondie, fresh from their first European tour, performed songs from the Blondie and Parallel Lines albums on May 4, 1978. Deborah Harry wore a long sleeve red shirt, with pink panties and red thigh high boots. Rockabilly singer Robert Gordon along with guitarist Link Wray opened the show.

The Police during their Regatta de Blanc World Tour played on November 29, 1979. Kiss played a warm-up show here, in 1980, before they kicked off their Unmasked Tour in Italy; it was Eric Carr's first live performance with the band. In 1991, Tin Machine performed at the venue during their It's My Life Tour on November 27 & 29; a portion of these performances were used for their live album Tin Machine Live: Oy Vey, Baby.

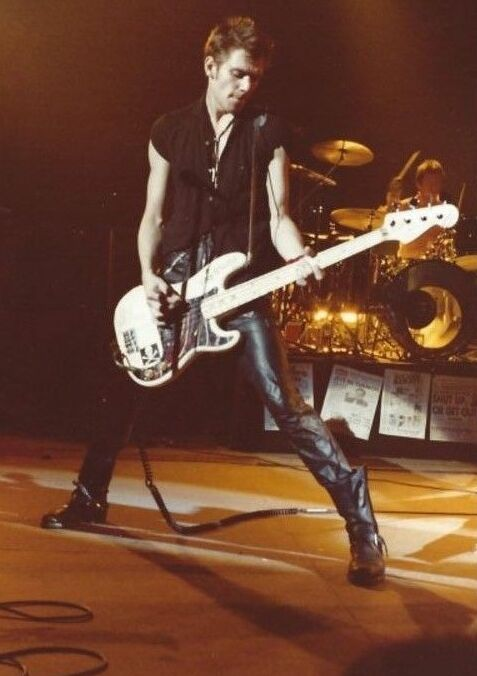
Paul Simonon performing with The Clash at the Palladium in 1979

On July 25, 1980, Kiss played the venue, their only North American concert in 1980, to introduce new drummer Eric Carr to the American press before heading overseas for their Unmasked Tour. Also part of the reason for having the concert was to help subsidize the rental of the Palladium for tour rehearsals with Carr.

Many UK punk and new wave acts made their New York debuts at the Palladium, including the Clash, the Jam, the Boomtown Rats, the Fall, Graham Parker & the Rumour, Rockpile, Duran Duran, the Undertones, and Roxy Music. American punk bands the Ramones, Blondie, the Cramps, and X also played there in the late seventies and early eighties. U2 performed at the Palladium for both their Boy and War album tours.

The venue was also where many British heavy metal acts made their initial impact in the United States in the late 1970s and early 1980s, including Judas Priest, Iron Maiden, Def Leppard, Ozzy Osbourne, Humble Pie, and other participants of the so-called new wave of British heavy metal. The classic line-up of Motörhead, with "Fast" Eddie Clarke on guitar, performed its final show at the Palladium on May 14, 1982.

By 1981, business had declined rapidly. "The Palladium has been over for the past year as far as is concerned," Delsener told Newsday. "We now average one show a month; we used to average four or five, But the acts aren't working anymore, they're not going on tour, the record companies don't support their small acts on tour anymore."

=== Newmann vs. Delmar Realty Co. ===
In 1982, artist Robert Newmann made a deal—with help from the Public Art Fund—with the Palladium's owner, Delmar Realty, and its tenant, Ron Delsener, allowing him to sandblast a mural onto the theater's rear wall. The agreement also said the owner would try to get any future tenant to honor the project. Newmann and his five-person crew worked on the wall section by section each month, but the project stopped after Delmar leased the building to Muidallap. That summer, Muidallap's president, Steven Greenberg, told Newmann the deal was no longer valid. In 1984, Newmann sued Delmar Realty Co., and a Manhattan State Supreme Court judge ruled that the building's new owners had to let him complete the mural. The court found that ordering Newmann to stop violated the state's Artists' Authorship Rights Act, which is meant to safeguard artistic works.

=== The Palladium nightclub ===
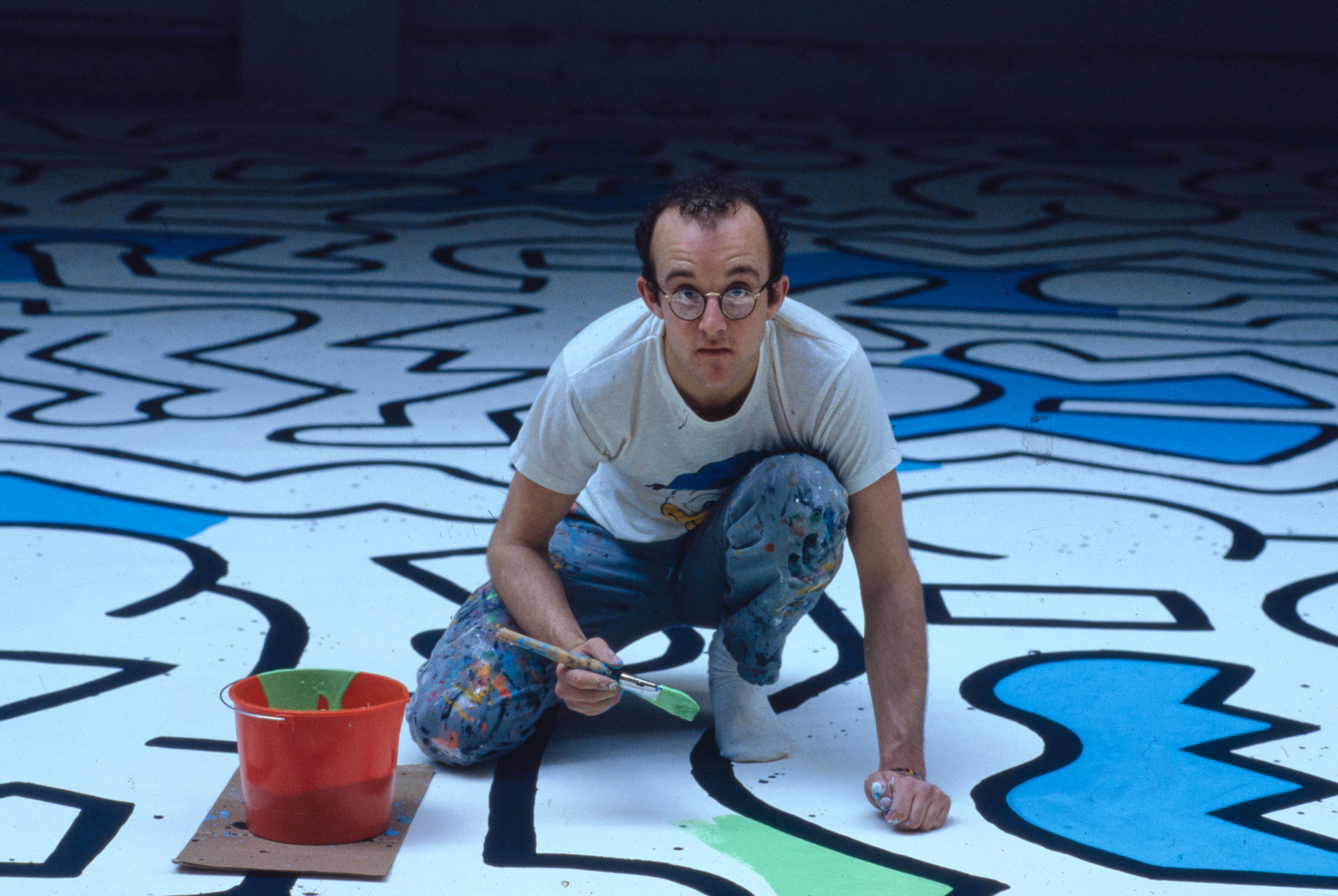
Keith Haring painting the mural for the back of the dance floor

In 1985, the Palladium was converted by Steve Rubell and Ian Schrager, the former owners of Studio 54, into what they called a "multimedia club." Designed by architect Arata Isozaki, the Palladium featured commissioned artworks by artists such as Keith Haring, Jean Michel Basquiat, Kenny Scharf, and Francesco Clemente. Andy Warhol designed the complimentary drink tickets. Isozaki rebuilt the space to enclose 9,660 square feet (897 m^{2}) across seven stories of nightclub rooms, each of them designed to have a distinct ambiance. The center of the club was the dance floor, behind which Haring's large mural was located, while the Mike Todd Room (the site of Palladium's Basquiat mural) and the Kenny Scharf Room were designed to be more exclusive and intimate spaces. The front of the club was composed of a large illuminated stairwell, decorated by Clemente frescos.

From its celebrity-studded opening in May 1985, the Palladium was one of the major features of the vibrant New York club scene, while continuing to host musicians. Rubell and Schrager hired Danceteria DJ Richard Sweret, DJ Patrick Anastasi and DJ Luis Martinez who saw the possibility of a much larger audience for a downtown new wave music, Euro and house music-oriented club.

In September 1985, Azzedine Alaia's fashion show was held at the Palladium. Chuck Berry played a New Year's Eve concert on December 31, 1988, recorded by WNEW-FM and available as "Chuck Berry Live At Palladium Theater, New York, WNEW-FM Broadcast, 31st December 1988". Moby had his first headlining show at Palladium in 1990 after original headliner Snap! had their flight cancelled. Argentine rock bands Los Fabulosos Cadillacs and Soda Stereo performed at the Palladium on September 25, 1995, and March 4, 1996, respectively. Junior Vasquez's Arena party, held Saturday nights and Sunday mornings at Palladium between September 1996 and September 1997, was one of the most popular parties in the New York club scene at the time. Although the promoters billed Arena as "The Gay Man's Pleasure Dome", the party drew an eclectic mix of gay and straight from Manhattan and far beyond. Vasquez commemorated Arena in the titles of the remixes he produced that year.

The club was a mainstay on the New York club scene until it was bought out in 1997 by New York University (NYU) and demolished for a campus housing project. The final concert held at Palladium was a sold-out performance by Fugazi on May 1, 1997. The artworks within the club were mostly removed, with the Haring and Basquiat murals currently held by the respective artists' estates.

== Recordings ==
The version of "Nantucket Sleighride" heard on Mountain's Live: The Road Goes Ever On album at was recorded during their Academy of Music performance on December 14, 1971.

On December 21, 1973, Lou Reed recorded both Rock 'n' Roll Animal and Lou Reed Live at Howard Stein's Academy of Music, released during February 1974 and March 1975 respectively, featuring songs from his solo career and the Velvet Underground.

Zappa in New York is a live double album by Frank Zappa recorded during a series of concerts at the Palladium in December 1976.

Levon Helm and the RCO All-Stars recorded Live at The Palladium NYC, New Year's Eve 1977. The CD album, released in March 2006, features over one hour of blues-rock music performed by a star-studded ensemble featuring Levon Helm (drums/vocals), Dr. John (keys/vocals), Paul Butterfield (harmonica/vocals), Fred Carter (guitar/vocals), Donald "Duck" Dunn (bass), Steve Cropper (guitar), Lou Marini (saxophones), Howard Johnson (tuba/baritone sax), Tom "Bones" Malone (trombone) and Alan Rubin (trumpet).

The Clash played at the Palladium on September 20 and 21, 1979, as a part of their U.S. tour, and the iconic photo from the September 20 show of Paul Simonon smashing his bass would later be used for the front cover of the Clash album London Calling. Irish punk band the Undertones and American soul legends Sam and Dave were the opening acts for the shows. Bootleg recordings of both performances have surfaced, even recording the moment Simonon smashed his bass during the September 20 show.

The photograph on the back of the Cramps' original 1979 debut EP, Gravest Hits, was taken at the Palladium.

Renaissance recorded Unplugged Live at the Academy of Music at the venue in 1985, although it was not released until 2000.

In 1992, C+C Music Factory recorded a song under the moniker S.O.U.L. S.Y.S.T.E.M. for the soundtrack to The Bodyguard (starring Whitney Houston and Kevin Costner). The song, "It's Gonna Be A Lovely Day", was the only song on the soundtrack performed by an artist other than Whitney Houston to be released as a single in the US. The remixes of the song, which were released via Arista Records on CD single, cassette single, and Double-12" vinyl single, were titled "The Palladium House Anthem I" and "The Palladium House Anthem II". At that time, C+C Music Factory member Robert Clivillés was the resident DJ at The Palladium.

In 2004, punk pioneers the Ramones reissued a live album they recorded at The Palladium. The album is called Live January 7, 1978 at the Palladium, NYC [LIVE], and was released by Sanctuary Records Group.

Club MTV, a live daily program, was also filmed there in the 1980s and early 1990s and starred Downtown Julie Brown.
