= The Closing of Winterland =

Live album by Grateful Dead
- Released: December 16, 2003
- Recorded: December 31, 1978
- Genres: Folk rock, jam
- Length: 250:12
- Label: Rhino Records
- Producers: Jeffrey Norman; David Lemieux

Grateful Dead chronology
Dick's Picks Volume 30 (2003)	The Closing of Winterland (2003)	Dick's Picks Volume 31 (2004)

Professional ratings
Review scores
Source	Rating
Allmusic	4.5/5 stars
The Music Box	5/5 stars
PopMatters	9/10 stars

The Closing of Winterland is a four-CD live album by the Grateful Dead. It contains the complete concert performed on December 31, 1978. The concert was also released as a two-disc DVD. The title derives from the fact that it was the last concert in San Francisco's Winterland Arena, which was shut down shortly thereafter. The Dead celebrated the closing as an approximately five-hour-long party (complete with breakfast with the audience at dawn) and invited some guests including guitarist John Cipollina of Quicksilver Messenger Service and Ken Kesey as well as actor Dan Aykroyd who provided the midnight countdown. It was certified Double Platinum by the RIAA on December 15, 2003 under the category of longform video, selling 200,000 units. The New Riders of the Purple Sage and Blues Brothers opened the show.

Pre-ordered DVD sets included the bonus CD "New Year's Eves at Winterland". It contains an additional nine tracks recorded on New Year's Eve in 1970, 1971, 1972 and 1977.

== Track listing ==
=== Disc one ===
First set:

1. "Sugar Magnolia" > (Bob Weir, Robert Hunter) – 7:21
2. "Scarlet Begonias" > (Jerry Garcia, Hunter) – 11:55
3. "Fire on the Mountain" (Mickey Hart, Hunter) – 15:05
4. "Me and My Uncle" (John Phillips) – 3:11
5. "Big River" (Johnny Cash) – 7:05
6. "Friend of the Devil" (Garcia, John Dawson, Hunter) – 10:48
7. "It's All Over Now" (Bobby Womack, Shirley Womack) – 8:23
8. "Stagger Lee" (Garcia, Hunter) – 8:03
9. "From the Heart of Me" > (Donna Godchaux) – 3:49
10. "Sunshine Daydream" (Weir, Hunter) – 3:15

=== Disc two ===
Second set:

1. "Samson and Delilah" (traditional, arranged by Weir) – 9:17
2. "Ramble On Rose" (Garcia, Hunter) – 9:35
3. "I Need a Miracle" > (Weir, John Barlow) – 11:19 (with Matthew Kelly)
4. "Terrapin Station" > (Garcia, Hunter) – 12:23
5. "Playing in the Band" > (Weir, Hart, Hunter) – 13:06

=== Disc three ===
Second set, continued:

1. "Rhythm Devils" > (Hart, Bill Kreutzmann) – 19:23 (with Lee Oskar)
2. "Not Fade Away" > (Norman Petty, Buddy Holly) – 19:34 (with John Cipollina and Lee Oskar)
3. "Around and Around" (Chuck Berry) – 9:19 (with John Cipollina, Lee Oskar, and Matthew Kelly)

=== Disc four ===
Third set:

1. "Dark Star" > (Garcia, Hart, Kreutzmann, Phil Lesh, Ron "Pigpen" McKernan, Weir, Hunter) – 11:53
2. "The Other One" > (Weir, Kreutzmann) – 4:55
3. "Dark Star" > (Garcia, Hart, Kreutzmann, Lesh, McKernan, Weir, Hunter) – 1:09
4. "Wharf Rat" > (Garcia, Hunter) – 11:08
5. "St. Stephen" > (Garcia, Lesh, Hunter) – 7:52
6. "Good Lovin' " (Rudy Clark, Arthur Resnick) – 13:57

First encore:

7. "Casey Jones" > (Garcia, Hunter) – 5:17
8. "Johnny B. Goode" (Berry) – 7:14

Second encore:

9. "And We Bid You Goodnight" (traditional, arranged by Grateful Dead) – 4:13

=== Bonus disc – "New Year's Eves at Winterland" ===
Recordings from other New Year's Eve concerts at Winterland:

1. "Easy Wind" (Hunter) – 9:35 (December 31, 1970) (Note: See also Family Dog at the Great Highway for more from this date)
2. "Jam" > (Grateful Dead) – 2:07 (December 31, 1971)
3. "Black Peter" (Garcia, Hunter) – 8:42 (December 31, 1971)
4. "Playing in the Band" (Weir, Hart, Hunter) – 18:26 (December 31, 1972) (Note: Edited version with early fade out)
5. "Lazy Lightning" > (Weir, Barlow) – 3:36 (December 31, 1977)
6. "Supplication" (Weir, Barlow) – 5:35 (December 31, 1977)
7. "Sugar Magnolia" (Weir, Hunter) – 11:59 (December 31, 1977)
8. "Scarlet Begonias" > (Garcia, Hunter) – 8:48 (December 31, 1977)
9. "Fire on the Mountain" (Hart, Hunter) – 10:06 (December 31, 1977) (Note: Epilogue patter of Bill Graham from December 31, 1972)

== DVD ==
The DVD version of The Closing of Winterland contains the video of the New Year's Eve show, with stereo and 5.1 surround sound audio options. It also includes some related bonus material. According to the bonus DVD, the concert was recorded on 2-inch quad video, considered the best quality at the time, and also on 24-track audio tape.

=== Disc one ===
- Concert – first set
- Concert – second set

=== Disc two ===
- Concert – third set
- "Winterland: A Million Memories" documentary film
- The Blues Brothers – "Soul Man" and "B Movie"
- New Riders of the Purple Sage – "Glendale Train"
- "Making of the DVD" featurette with David Lemieux and Jeffrey Norman
- "2 AM" interview with Bob Weir, Mickey Hart, and Ken Kesey
- Bill Graham interview by Scoop Nisker
- "Grateful Dead at Winterland" chronological history

== Personnel ==
Grateful Dead

- Jerry Garcia – guitar, vocals
- Bob Weir – guitar, vocals
- Phil Lesh – electric bass, vocals
- Donna Godchaux – vocals
- Keith Godchaux – piano
- Mickey Hart – drums, percussion
- Bill Kreutzmann – drums, percussion

Additional musicians

- Bill Graham – master of ceremonies, appears as Father Time on a flying joint
- Dan Aykroyd – midnight countdown
- John Cipollina – guitar o
- Ken Kesey – thunder machine
- Matthew Kelly – harmonica
- Lee Oskar – harmonica
- Greg Errico – drums

Production

- David Lemieux – producer
- Jeffrey Norman – producer, mixing
- Eileen Law – archival research
- Stanley Mouse – cover art
- Alton Kelley – cover art
- Ed Perlstein – photography
- Michael Zagaris – additional photography
- Steve Schneider – additional photography
- Robert Minkin – package design and production
- Gary Lambert – liner notes
- Glenn Lambert – liner notes
