= Heaven Help the Fool =

1978 studio album by Bob Weir

Studio album by Bob Weir
- Released: January 13, 1978
- Recorded: 1977
- Genre: Rock; country; folk
- Length: 34:43
- Label: Arista
- Producer: Keith Olsen

Bob Weir chronology
Live 'n' Kickin' (1977)	Heaven Help the Fool (1978)	Bobby and the Midnites (1981)

Heaven Help the Fool is the second solo album by Grateful Dead rhythm guitarist Bob Weir, released in 1978. It was recorded during time off from touring, in the summer of 1977, while Grateful Dead drummer Mickey Hart recovered from injuries sustained in a vehicular accident. Weir returned to the studio with Keith Olsen, having recorded Terrapin Station with the producer earlier in the year. Several well-known studio musicians were hired for the project, including widely used session player Waddy Wachtel and Toto members David Paich and Mike Porcaro.

Only "Salt Lake City" and the title track were played live by the Grateful Dead, the former in its namesake location on February 21, 1995, and the latter in an instrumental arrangement during their 1980 acoustic sets. Despite this, Weir continued to consistently play tracks from the album with other bands of his, including RatDog and Bobby Weir & Wolf Bros. "Bombs Away" was released as a single and peaked at number 70 on the Billboard Hot 100, becoming his only solo song to make the chart. The album itself stalled at number 69, one spot behind his previous album, Ace.

== Critical reception ==
Professional ratings
Review scores
Source	Rating
AllMusic	1.5/5 stars
Christgau's Record Guide	C+
The Rolling Stone Album Guide	3/5 stars

The Globe and Mail wrote that "Weir is more than just another competent guitarist, but it's easy to see why he sang rarely and didn't account for the band's best tunes... At its best, Heaven Help the Fool provides a slight alternative to California Mellow."

== Track listing ==
Side one
No.	Title	Writer(s)	Length
1.	"Bombs Away"	John Perry Barlow, Bob Weir	5:06
2.	"Easy to Slip"	Lowell George, Martin Kibbee	3:05
3.	"Salt Lake City"	Barlow, Weir	4:04
4.	"Shade of Grey"	Barlow, Weir	4:30

Side two
No.	Title	Writer(s)	Length
1.	"Heaven Help the Fool"	Barlow, Weir	5:30
2.	"This Time Forever"	Barlow, Weir	4:09
3.	"I'll Be Doggone"	Warren Moore, Smokey Robinson, Marv Tarplin	3:07
4.	"Wrong Way Feelin'"	Barlow, Weir	5:12
Total length:			34:43

== Personnel ==
- Bob Weir – rhythm guitar, vocals
- Mike Baird – drums on tracks 1, 3–6 & 8
- Bill Champlin – background vocals on tracks 1 & 3–8, keyboards on tracks 2 & 7, organ on tracks 3 & 8
- David Foster – keyboards on tracks 1–8
- Lynette Gloud – background vocals on tracks 5–8
- Tom Kelly – background vocals on tracks 1–6 & 8
- Dee Murray – bass guitar on track 2
- Nigel Olsson – drums on tracks 2 & 7
- David Paich – keyboards on tracks 1, 3–6 & 8
- Mike Porcaro – bass guitar on tracks 1 & 3–8
- Peggy Sandvig – keyboards on track 4
- Tom Scott – saxophones on tracks 1, 3 & 5
- Carmen Twilley – background vocals on tracks 5–8
- Waddy Wachtel – lead guitar on tracks 2–3 & 7

Production

- Producer – Keith Olsen
- Engineers – David de Vore and Keith Olsen
- Art direction – Ria Lewerke
- Photography – Richard Avedon
- Mastering – Ted Jensen at Sterling Sound, NYC

== Charts ==
Chart (1978)	Peak position
Australia (Kent Music Report)	97
