= Trident (Kingfish album) =

1978 studio album by Kingfish

Studio album by Kingfish
- Released: 1978
- Recorded: 1978
- Genre: Rock
- Label: Jet
- Producer: Johnny Sandlin

Kingfish chronology
Live 'n' Kickin' (1977)	Trident (1978)	Kingfish (1985)

Professional ratings
Review scores
Source	Rating
AllMusic	3/5 stars

Trident is an album by the rock band Kingfish. Their second studio album and their third album overall, it was recorded at the Record Plant in Sausalito, California, and released by Jet Records in 1978.

Trident features Kingfish co-founders Matthew Kelly on guitar and Dave Torbert on bass. Original members Robbie Hoddinott and Chris Herold had left the band before the album was recorded, and had been replaced by lead guitarist Michael O'Neill and ex-Wings drummer Joe English, respectively. Rounding out the lineup was keyboardist Bob Hogins.

== Track listing ==
1. "Hard to Love Somebody" (Michael O'Neill)
2. "Cheyenne" (John Carter, Tim Gilbert)
3. "Hurricane" (O'Neill, Matthew Kelly)
4. "My Friend" (Bob Hogins)
5. "Magic Eyes" (Dave Torbert)
6. "Movin' Down the Highway" (O'Neill)
7. "Hawaii" (Torbert, Kelly)
8. "You and I" (Hogins)
9. "Feels So Good" (Hogins, O'Neill, Torbert)
10. "Take It Too Hard" (O'Neill)

== Personnel ==
=== Kingfish ===
- Matthew Kelly – guitar, harmonica, vocals
- Dave Torbert – bass, vocals
- Michael O'Neill – guitar, vocals
- Bob Hogins – keyboards, vocals
- Joe English – drums

=== Additional musicians ===
- John Hug – guitar
- Johnny Sandlin – bass
- Dave Perper – vocals

=== Production ===
- Johnny Sandlin – producer
- Carolyn Harris – production assistant
- Tom Anderson, Tom Flye – engineers
- Alex Kash, Steve Fontano – assistant engineers
- Kurt Kinzel, Johnny Sandlin, Carolyn Harris – additional recording and mixing
- James A. Nelson – trident logo design
- Michael Zigaris – photography
