= Bobby and the Midnites (album) =

1981 studio album by Bobby and the Midnites

Studio album by Bobby and the Midnites
- Released: October 21, 1981
- Genre: Rock, country
- Length: 38:47
- Label: Arista
- Producer: Gary Lyons

Bob Weir chronology
Heaven Help the Fool (1978)	Bobby and the Midnites (1981)	Where the Beat Meets the Street (1984)

Professional ratings
Review scores
Source	Rating
AllMusic	4.5/5 stars
The Rolling Stone Album Guide	3.5/5 stars

Bobby and the Midnites is a 1981 studio album by Grateful Dead singer and guitarist Bob Weir and his then side project, Bobby and the Midnites. The band featured fellow Grateful Dead member Brent Mydland at that time, and also jazz fusion drummer Billy Cobham. Though not a huge commercial success, the album did chart in the Billboard 200 and reached #158 in December 1981. The song "Festival" became a live concert favorite for the band. "(I Want to) Fly Away" was reissued on the 2004 compilation album Weir Here – The Best of Bob Weir.

== Track listing ==
Side one

1. "Haze" (Brent Mydland, Essra Mohawk, Bob Weir, Bobby Cochran, Matthew Kelly) – 5:08
2. "Too Many Losers" (Cochran, Weir) – 3:50
3. "Far Away" (Weir, Cochran, Kelly) – 3:34
4. "Book of Rules" (Harry Johnson, Barry Llewellyn) – 3:31
5. "Me, Without You" (John Perry Barlow, Alphonso Johnson) – 3:12

Side two

1. "Josephine" (Weir) – 6:11
2. "(I Want to) Fly Away" (Barlow, Weir) – 3:55
3. "Carry Me" (Weir) – 4:27
4. "Festival" (Weir) – 4:59

== Personnel ==
=== Musicians ===
- Billy Cobham – drums, vocals
- Bobby Cochran – guitar, vocals
- Alphonso Johnson – bass, vocals
- Matt Kelly – harmonica, vocals
- Brent Mydland – keyboards, vocals
- Bob Weir – guitar, vocals

=== Production ===
- Producer – Gary Lyons
- Engineers – Gary Lyons, Gregg Mann, Pete Thea and John Cutler
- Mastering – George Marino
- Lyric supervision – John Barlow
- Art direction – Victor Moscoso
- Photography – Elizabeth Fenimore
