= Kingfish (1976 album) =

1976 debut studio album by Kingfish

Studio album by Kingfish
- Released: March 1976
- Genre: Rock
- Length: 40:07
- Label: Round
- Producer: Dan Healy; Bob Weir

Kingfish chronology
Kingfish (1976)	Live 'n' Kickin' (1977)

Bob Weir chronology
Ace (1972)	Kingfish (1976)	Live 'n' Kickin' (1977)

Professional ratings
Review scores
Source	Rating
AllMusic	2.5/5 stars

Kingfish is the self-titled first album by the rock band Kingfish. It was recorded and released in 1976.

When they recorded their debut album, the lineup of Kingfish included Grateful Dead rhythm guitarist Bob Weir. Weir was a member of the band from 1974 to 1976, and left the group shortly after the album's release. Kingfish includes "Lazy Lightnin'" and "Supplication", a jazzy song combination sung by Weir that quickly found its way into the Grateful Dead repertoire.

Besides Weir, Kingfish features original band members Matthew Kelly on guitar and harmonica, Dave Torbert on bass, Robbie Hoddinott on guitar, and Chris Herold on drums.

== Track listing ==
Side one
No.	Title	Writer(s)	Lead vocals	Length
1.	"Lazy Lightnin'"	John Perry Barlow, Bob Weir	Weir	3:02
2.	"Supplication"	Barlow, Weir	Weir	2:56
3.	"Wild Northland"	Tim Hovey, Dave Torbert	Torbert	2:24
4.	"Asia Minor"	John Carter, Tim Gilbert, Hovey, Scott Quigley	Torbert	3:32
5.	"Home to Dixie"	Barlow, John Cutler, Matt Kelly, Weir	Weir	3:52
6.	"Jump for Joy"	Carter, Gilbert	Torbert	3:49

Side two
No.	Title	Writer(s)	Lead vocals	Length
1.	"Good-Bye Yer Honor"	Hovey, Kelly, Torbert	Torbert	2:56
2.	"Big Iron"	Marty Robbins	Weir	4:30
3.	"This Time"	Kelly, Torbert	Torbert	4:23
4.	"Hypnotize"	Kelly, Torbert	Torbert	4:35
5.	"Bye and Bye" (arrangement: Barlow, Weir)	traditional	Weir	4:03
Total length:				40:07

== Credits ==
=== Kingfish ===
- Bob Weir – guitar, vocals, lead vocals on "Lazy Lightnin'", "Supplication", "Home to Dixie", "Big Iron" & "Bye and Bye"
- Matthew Kelly – guitar, harmonica, vocals
- Dave Torbert – bass, vocals
- Robby Hoddinott – lead guitar, slide guitar
- Chris Herold – drums, percussion

=== Additional personnel ===
- Steve Evans – bass
- Barry Flast – piano, vocals
- Pablo Green – percussion on track 10
- Anna Rizzo – vocals
- Jim Sanchez – drums
- J.D. Sharp – string symphonizer on tracks 1, 9, and 10

=== Production ===
- Producer – Dan Healy, Bob Weir
- Production assistants – Richard Hundgren, Dean Layman
- Arrangement – Kingfish
- Recording – Dan Healy, Kingfish
- Engineer – Rob Taylor
- Mastering – George Horn
- Cover painting – Philip Garris
- Trident logo – James A. Nelson III
- Photography – Bob Marks
