= David Perper =

American drummer

- Genres: Rock, Pop rock
- Occupation: Musician
- Instruments: Drums, percussion

David Perper is an American drummer. Since 1970, David has played and recorded with national and local Bay Area artists and bands including Kingfish, the New Riders of the Purple Sage, Jesse Colin Young, the Youngbloods, the Mamas & the Papas, the Hoodoo Rhythm Devils, the Rowan Brothers, Peter Rowan and the Free Mexican Air Force, the Sounds of San Francisco (featuring John Cippolina, Greg Douglas, Alex Ligertwood, and David Margen), Lamb, Steve Seskin, Bill Cutler, Barry Flast and Trouble, David Denny, Chris Michie and Andy Kulberg, Rahni Raines, Joe Christmas, and Big Bang Beat. Perper lives in San Francisco.

He played for the California band Pablo Cruise to replace founding drummer Steve Price. Perper was aboard in 1983 for their last album for A&M Records, Out of Our Hands, although Price played on two songs. He then departed in 1984 as the original members of the band briefly reunited in 1985-1986 before disbanding altogether. Perper then joined a brief (1984–85) reunion of The Youngbloods, toured with Jesse Colin Young, and is known to have played as a substitute drummer for The Rhythm Rockers (Robert Valdez, guitar; Gil Roman, bass and lead vocals) c. 1990, for one gig at the now defunct Pat O'Shea's Mad Hatter on Geary Boulevard in San Francisco. In 1986, David formed the City Section featuring ex-Santana members Alex Ligertwood and David Margen, Nate Ginsberg, and Jerry Cortez.

David Perper was at times a member of the band Kingfish, playing in versions of the band that sometimes included Bob Weir of the Grateful Dead. Perper played with John Cipollina in The Sounds of San Francisco c. 1986. From 2011 through October 2016, David was a member of the Daniel Castro Band.
