= Very Best of the Relix Years =

Compilation album by New Riders of the Purple Sage
- Released: June 2, 2009
- Recorded: 1969–1993
- Genre: Country rock
- Label: Retro World

New Riders of the Purple Sage chronology
Winterland, San Francisco, CA, 12/31/77 (2009)	Very Best of the Relix Years (2009)	Where I Come From (2009)

Professional ratings
Review scores
Source	Rating
Allmusic	3/5 stars

Very Best of the Relix Years is an album by the country rock band the New Riders of the Purple Sage. It was released in England on the Retro World label on June 2, 2009. It contains previously released songs from five Relix Records albums.

Very Best of the Relix Years includes the complete contents of Live on Stage, an album that was recorded live in 1975 and released in 1993, and Keep On Keepin' On, a studio album released in 1989. It also includes selected songs from Before Time Began that were recorded in the studio in 1969 and released in 1986, as well as selections from Midnight Moonlight, a studio album released in 1992, and Live in Japan, a live album recorded in 1993 and released in 1994.

Confusingly, the front cover of Very Best of the Relix Years is the same as the front cover of another New Riders compilation album, Relix's Best of the New New Riders of the Purple Sage.

== Track listing ==
=== Disc one ===
Live on Stage:

1. "Panama Red" (Peter Rowan) – 3:17
2. "Little Old Lady" (Richard Wilbur) – 3:16
3. "Instant Armadillo Blues" (John Dawson) – 5:18
4. "Henry" (Dawson) – 5:00
5. "Glendale Train" (Dawson) – 5:31
6. "Nadine" (Chuck Berry) – 6:39
7. "Singing Cowboy" (Skip Battin) – 4:39
8. "Take a Letter Maria" (R. B. Greaves) – 5:14
9. "I Will Never Make You Blue" (C. Cline, R. Cline) – 4:03
10. "La Bamba" (Ritchie Valens) – 4:52

Keep On Keepin' On, part one:

11. "Keep On Keepin' On" (Dawson) – 3:33
12. "Now I Call It Love" (Dawson) – 2:46
13. "It's O.K. to Cry" (Val Fuentes, Rusty Gauthier, Lina Valentino) – 3:18
14. "Bounty Hunter" (Fuentes, Gauthier, Valentino) – 4:01
15. "Barbaric Splendor" (Joe New) – 3:19

=== Disc two ===
Keep On Keepin' On, part two:

1. "Señorita" (Dawson) – 3:00
2. "Night of the Living Lonely" (Johnson, New) – 2:58
3. "Rancher's Daughter" (Dawson) – 3:02
4. "Big Ed" (Gauthier) – 3:17
5. "Friend of the Devil" (Dawson, Jerry Garcia, Robert Hunter) – 3:36

Selections from Before Time Began:

6. "Henry" (Dawson) – 3:39
7. "All I Ever Wanted" (Dawson) – 4:28
8. "Last Lonely Eagle" (Dawson) – 4:47
9. "Cecilia" (Dawson) – 4:06
10. "Garden of Eden" (Dawson) – 3:09
11. "Superman" (Dawson) – 2:19

Selections from Midnight Moonlight:

12. "Charlie's Garden" (Dawson) – (3:23)
13. "Ballad of the Deportees" (Woody Guthrie) – (3:23)
14. "Taking It Hard" (New) – (4:26)
15. "Change in the Weather" (Dawson) – (4:09)
16. "Diesel on My Tail" (Jim Fagan) – (3:05)

Selections from Live in Japan:

17. "Early in the Morning" (traditional) – 9:50
18. "Ripple" (Garcia, Hunter) – 6:20

== Personnel ==
- John Dawson – guitar, vocals on Before Time Began, Live on Stage, Keep On Keepin' On, Midnight Moonlight, and Live in Japan
- David Nelson – guitar, vocals on Before Time Began and Live on Stage
- Rusty Gauthier – guitar, dobro, lap steel guitar, fiddle, mandolin, banjo, vocals on Keep On Keepin' On, Midnight Moonlight, and Live in Japan
- Gary Vogensen – guitar, vocals on Keep On Keepin' On, Midnight Moonlight, and Live in Japan
- Jerry Garcia – pedal steel guitar, vocals on Before Time Began
- Buddy Cage – pedal steel guitar on Live on Stage
- Phil Lesh – bass on Before Time Began
- Skip Battin – bass, vocals on Live on Stage
- Michael White – bass on Keep On Keepin' On
- Fred Campbell – bass on Midnight Moonlight
- Mickey Hart – drums on Before Time Began
- Spencer Dryden – drums on Live on Stage
- Greg Lagardo – drums on Keep On Keepin' On
