= Live (New Riders of the Purple Sage album) =

Live album by New Riders of the Purple Sage
- Released: 1995
- Recorded: 1982
- Genre: Country rock
- Length: 43:34
- Label: Avenue
- Producer: Jerry Goldstein

New Riders of the Purple Sage chronology
Wasted Tasters (1994)	Live (1995)	Relix's Best of the Early New Riders of the Purple Sage (1995)

Professional ratings
Review scores
Source	Rating
Allmusic	4/5 stars

Live is an album by the country rock band the New Riders of the Purple Sage. It was recorded live at the Palomino in North Hollywood, California on September 21 and November 20, 1982. It was released on the Avenue Records label on February 14, 1995. The album is sometimes referred to as Live (1982).

The Palomino shows were recorded not long after David Nelson and Buddy Cage had left NRPS and Rusty Gauthier had joined, a major change in the band's lineup. John "Marmaduke" Dawson was the only remaining original member at this time. Dawson and guitarist Allen Kemp, separately or together, wrote eight of the eleven songs on the album. Also featured are Billy Wolf on bass and Val Fuentes, who was previously in the band It's a Beautiful Day, on drums.

Live showcases a harder rocking sound than on the New Riders' previous albums. In subsequent years the Dawson / Gauthier New Riders would adopt a partly electric and partly acoustic style of music that was influenced less by rock and more by folk and bluegrass.

== Track listing ==
1. "Henry" (John Dawson) – 3:35
2. "The Way She Dances" (Dawson, Allen Kemp) – 3:54
3. "Tell Me" (Kemp) – 4:25
4. "Crazy Little Girl" (Dawson, Kemp) – 4:50
5. "Saralyn" (Dawson) – 3:06
6. "Panama Red" (Peter Rowan) – 3:11
7. "No Other Love" (Dawson, Kemp) – 4:10
8. "Can't Judge a Book" (Willie Dixon) – 4:25
9. "Rainbow" (Dawson) – 3:57
10. "I Don't Know You" (Dawson) – 3:31
11. "Dead Flowers" (Mick Jagger, Keith Richards) – 4:40

== Personnel ==
=== New Riders of the Purple Sage ===
- John Dawson – acoustic guitar, vocals
- Rusty Gauthier – electric guitar, violin, lap steel guitar, vocals
- Allen Kemp – electric guitar, vocals
- Val Fuentes – drums
- Billy Wolf – bass guitar

=== Production ===
- Jerry Goldstein – producer
- Kevin Beamish – mixing
- Frank Rand – mixing
- Joe Gastwirt – mastering
- Graphix Express – art design
- Abbey Anna – project coordination
