= Relix's Best of the New New Riders of the Purple Sage =

Greatest hits album by New Riders of the Purple Sage
- Released: 1997
- Recorded: 1989–1993
- Genre: Country rock
- Label: Relix

New Riders of the Purple Sage chronology
Relix's Best of the Early New Riders of the Purple Sage (1995)	Relix's Best of the New New Riders of the Purple Sage (1997)	Ridin' with Panama Red (2000)

Relix's Best of the New New Riders of the Purple Sage is an album by the country rock band the New Riders of the Purple Sage. It was released on March 11, 1997. It contains previously released songs that were recorded between 1989 and 1993 and that were selected from three albums on the Relix Records label. It was a follow-up to the 1995 compilation Relix's Best of the Early New Riders of the Purple Sage.

The albums excerpted on Relix's Best of the New New Riders of the Purple Sage are Keep On Keepin' On (a studio album released in 1989), Midnight Moonlight (a studio album released in 1992), and Live in Japan (a live album recorded in 1993 and released in 1994).

== Track listing ==
From Midnight Moonlight:

1. "Charlie's Garden" (John Dawson) – (3:23)
2. "Ballad of the Deportees" (Woody Guthrie) – (3:23)
3. "Taking It Hard" (Joe New) – (4:26)
4. "Change in the Weather" (Dawson) – (4:09)
5. "Diesel on My Tail" (Jim Fagan) – (3:05)

From Keep On Keepin' On:

6. "Keep On Keepin' On" (Dawson) – 3:33
7. "Bounty Hunter" (Val Fuentes, Rusty Gauthier, Lina Valentino) – 4:01
8. "Rancher's Daughter" (Dawson) – 3:02

From Live in Japan:

9. "Early in the Morning" (traditional) – 9:50
10. "Ripple" (Jerry Garcia, Robert Hunter) – 6:20

== Personnel ==
- John Dawson – guitar, vocals
- Rusty Gauthier – guitar, dobro, lap steel guitar, fiddle, mandolin, banjo, vocals
- Gary Vogensen – guitar, vocals
- Fred Campbell – bass on tracks 1 – 5
- Michael White – bass on tracks 6 – 8
- Greg Lagardo – drums on tracks 6 – 8
