= Marrying Maiden =

Studio album by It's a Beautiful Day
- Released: June 1970
- Recorded: 1970
- Studio: Pacific High (San Francisco); Wally Heider Studios (San Francisco)
- Genre: Psychedelic rock
- Length: 38:31
- Label: Columbia; CBS
- Producer: Brent Dangerfield, It's A Beautiful Day

It's a Beautiful Day chronology
It's a Beautiful Day (1969)	Marrying Maiden (1970)	Choice Quality Stuff/Anytime (1971)

Singles from Marrying Maiden
- 1. "Soapstone Mountain" Released: October 13, 1970; 2. "Do You Remember The Sun?" Released: January 18, 1971

Professional ratings
Review scores
Source	Rating
Allmusic	3/5 stars

Marrying Maiden is the second studio album by San Francisco psychedelic band It's a Beautiful Day, released in 1970 on Columbia Records. Founding member Linda LaFlamme was replaced by keyboardist Fred Webb on this project. Grateful Dead guitarist Jerry Garcia contributed on two tracks and Charlatans member Richard Olsen guested on a track as well.

The album was the band's most successful on the charts, reaching number 28 in the U.S. and number 45 in the U.K.

== Critical reception ==
Lindsay Planer at AllMusic gave the album three stars out of five, writing:

"The second long-player from It's a Beautiful Day is an exceedingly more pastoral effort than the band's self-titled debut. As many of the Bay Area groups...had begun to do, the band realigns its sound from the dark psychedelia and proto-prog of its earlier works and into a lighter and earthier country-flavored rock."

== Track listing ==
1. "Don And Dewey" (David LaFlamme) – 5:16
2. "The Dolphins" (Fred Neil) – 4:30
3. "Essence Of Now" (Mitchell Holman) – 3:20
4. "Hoedown" (LaFlamme) – 2:29
5. "Soapstone Mountain" (LaFlamme) – 4:20
6. "Waiting For The Song" (Hal Wagenet) – 1:03
7. "Let A Woman Flow" (LaFlamme, Pattie Santos) – 4:04
8. "It Comes Right Down To You" (Fred Webb, Robert Lewis) – 3:14
9. "Good Lovin'" (Webb, Holman) – 3:59
10. "Galileo" (Wagenet) – 3:02
11. "Do You Remember The Sun?" (Webb, Lewis) – 3:14

== Personnel ==
=== It's a Beautiful Day ===
- David LaFlamme – lead vocals, violin, guitar, flute
- Pattie Santos – vocals, backing vocals, percussion
- Fred Webb – keyboards, French horn, backing vocals
- Hal Wagenet – guitar, vocals (spoken)
- Mitchell Holman – bass, mouth harp, backing vocals
- Val Fuentes – drums, backing vocals

=== Additional musicians ===
- Jerry Garcia – banjo (track 4), pedal steel guitar (track 8)
- Richard Olsen – clarinet (track 8)

=== Production ===
- Brent Dangerfield, It's a Beautiful Day – producers
- David Brown, John Fiore – engineers

== Chart performance ==
=== Album ===
Chart (1970)	Year	Peak position	Total weeks
US Billboard 200	1970	28	21
UK Official Charts	1970	45	2
CAN Official Charts	1970	35	10
