= Relix's Best of the Early New Riders of the Purple Sage =

1995 album by New Riders of the Purple Sage

Greatest hits album by New Riders of the Purple Sage
- Released: 1995
- Recorded: 1969–1975
- Genre: Country rock
- Label: Relix

New Riders of the Purple Sage chronology
Live (1995)	Relix's Best of the Early New Riders of the Purple Sage (1995)	Relix's Best of the New New Riders of the Purple Sage (1997)

Professional ratings
Review scores
Source	Rating
Allmusic	3/5 stars

Relix's Best of the Early New Riders of the Purple Sage is an album by the country rock band the New Riders of the Purple Sage. It was released on August 5, 1995. It contains previously released songs that were recorded between 1969 and 1975 and were selected from three albums on the Relix Records label — Before Time Began, Vintage NRPS, and Live on Stage.

The songs on Relix's Best of the Early New Riders of the Purple Sage that were excerpted from Before Time Began were recorded in November, 1969 at the Pacific Heights Recording studio in San Francisco, California. They feature the original lineup of the New Riders – John Dawson, David Nelson, and three members of the Grateful Dead — Jerry Garcia, Phil Lesh, and Mickey Hart.

The songs taken from Vintage NRPS were recorded live in February, 1971, at the Capitol Theatre in Port Chester, New York. Garcia also plays on these tracks.

The songs from Live on Stage were recorded live in 1975 at the Beacon Theatre in New York City and the Keystone in Berkeley, California.

== Track listing ==
From Before Time Began:

1. "Henry" (John Dawson) – 3:36
2. "Last Lonely Eagle" (Dawson) – 4:43
3. "Cecilia" (Dawson) – 4:03

From Vintage NRPS:

4. "Dirty Business" (Dawson) – 11:40
5. "Honky Tonk Women" (Mick Jagger, Keith Richards) – 5:51
6. "Portland Woman" (Dawson) – 5:21

From Live on Stage:

7. "Panama Red" (Peter Rowan) – 3:05
8. "Glendale Train" (Dawson) – 5:36
9. "Nadine" (Chuck Berry) – 6:27
10. "Singing Cowboy" (Skip Battin, Kim Fowley) – 4:26
11. "La Bamba" (Ritchie Valens) – 4:56

== Personnel ==
- John Dawson – guitar, vocals
- David Nelson – guitar, vocals
- Jerry Garcia – pedal steel guitar on tracks 1 – 6
- Buddy Cage – pedal steel guitar on tracks 7 – 11
- Phil Lesh – bass on tracks 1 – 3
- Dave Torbert – bass, vocals on tracks 4 – 6
- Skip Battin – bass, vocals on tracks 7 – 11
- Mickey Hart – drums on tracks 1 – 3
- Spencer Dryden – drums on tracks 4 – 11
