= Keep On Keeping On =

Keep On Keeping On or Keep On Keepin' On may refer to:

== Film ==
- Keep On Keepin' On (film), a 2014 documentary about jazz musician Clark Terry

== Music ==
=== Albums ===
- Keep On Keepin' On, by Brenda Patterson, 1970
- Keep On Keepin' On (New Riders of the Purple Sage album), 1989
- Keep On Keepin' On (Chuck Wagon Gang album), 1993
- Keep On Keepin' On, by Tom Shaka, 2002
- Keep On Keepin' On, by Kashief Lindo, 2008
- Keep On Keepin' On, by The Riptide Movement, 2012

=== Songs ===
- "Keep On Keeping On", by Len Chandler 1964, from the album To Be a Man 1966 - cited in speech by Martin Luther King Jr.
- "Keep On Keeping On", by Ruby Johnson, Parker, Catron, Johnson, 1967
- "Keep On Keeping On", by N. F. Porter 1971, covered by Joy Division
- "Keep On Keeping On", by Curtis Mayfield on Roots, 1971
- "Keep On Keepin' On", performed by The Sylvers from Showcase, 1975
- "Keep On Keepin' On", by Rose Royce from Car Wash: Original Motion Picture Soundtrack, 1976
- "Keep On Keeping On", by Side Effect from Goin' Bananas
- "Keep On Keeping On", by The Redskins, 1984
- "Keep On Keepin' On", by New Riders of the Purple Sage, from the album of the same name, 1989
- "Keep On Keepin' On" (song), Jermaine Dupri, 1996
- "Keep On Keepin' On", by Paul Gilbert on Burning Organ, 2002
- "Keep On Keepin' On", by Tech N9ne from Absolute Power, 2002
- "Keep on Keepin' On", by JoJo from JoJo, 2004
- "Keep On Keeping On", by Tone Damli from Bliss, 2005
- "Keep On Keeping On", by Danger Danger from Revolve, 2009
- "Keep On Keeping On", by Seasick Steve from Hubcap Music, 2009
- "Keep On Keeping On", by Travis McCoy, 2014
- "Keep On Keepin' On", by Bleached from the album Welcome the Worms, 2016

== See also ==
- Keep Keepin' On: The Best of the Arista Years, compilation album by General Johnson including "Keep Keepin' On" 1976
