= It's a Beautiful Day (album) =

Debut album by San Francisco psychedelic band It's a Beautiful Day

Studio album by It's a Beautiful Day
- Released: June 1969
- Recorded: 1968–1969
- Studio: CBS Studios (Los Angeles)
- Genre: Psychedelic rock
- Length: 40:42
- Labels: Columbia; CBS
- Producer: David LaFlamme

It's a Beautiful Day chronology
It's a Beautiful Day (1969)	Marrying Maiden (1970)

Singles from It's a Beautiful Day
- 1. "Bulgaria" Released: 1968; 2. "White Bird" Released: July 1, 1969

Professional ratings
Review scores
Source	Rating
AllMusic	4/5 stars
Music Week	3/4 stars
Rolling Stone	(negative)

It's a Beautiful Day is the debut album by San Francisco band It's a Beautiful Day. Released by Columbia Records in 1969, the album rose to number 47 on the U.S. LP charts. It remained on the Billboard Top 200 for 70 continuous weeks, and would go on to achieve Gold Record certification in November 1972. This album contains the band's biggest hit song, "White Bird."

== Album cover ==
The album cover, designed by George Hunter and painted by Kent Hollister, was based on the 1912 painting Woman on the Top of a Mountain by Charles Courtney Curran. The design used an old version of the Columbia Records logo because George Hunter believed it fit better with the feel of the rest of the cover. This cover is number 24 on Rolling Stone's list of 100 greatest album covers.

== Album content ==
The group's signature song "White Bird" was inspired by the experiences David and Linda LaFlamme had while living in Seattle, Washington. During December 1967 and into early 1968, the group members lived in the attic of an old house while playing and rehearsing at a Seattle venue originally known as The Encore Ballroom. The band's manager, Matthew Katz, had recently assumed control over the club and renamed it "San Francisco Sound". In an ironic twist on the band's name, the song was partly inspired by Seattle's rainy winter weather. In a later interview David LaFlamme said:

Where the 'white bird' thing came from ... We were like caged birds in that attic. We had no money, no transportation, the weather was miserable. We were just barely getting by on a very small food allowance provided to us. It was quite an experience, but it was very creative in a way.

This album also features tracks such as "Hot Summer Day," "Girl With No Eyes" and "Time Is." A substantial part of the theme and arrangement of the song "Bombay Calling" was used by Deep Purple as the basis for their song "Child in Time."

== Critical reception ==
Lindsay Planer at AllMusic, gave the album four stars out of five, writing:

It's a Beautiful Day were no less memorable for their unique progressive rock style that contrasted well with the Bay Area psychedelic scene...It's a Beautiful Day remains as a timepiece and evidence of how sophisticated rock & roll had become in the fertile environs of the San Francisco music scene.

== In popular culture ==
The song "White Bird" is used in three episodes of the 1980s television series Knight Rider. It is the theme song for the relationship between main character Michael Knight and his one true love, and appears in the episodes "White Bird" in season 1, "Let It Be Me" in season 2 and "The Scent of Roses" in season 4. The song was also featured in the 2015 movie Focus with Will Smith. The album cover is used in Naoki Urasawa's 2018 one-shot manga "It's a Beautiful Day".

== Track listing ==
Side one
No.	Title	Writer(s)	Length
1.	"White Bird"	David & Linda LaFlamme	6:06
2.	"Hot Summer Day"	D. & L. LaFlamme	5:46
3.	"Wasted Union Blues"	D. LaFlamme	4:00
4.	"Girl With No Eyes"	D. & L. LaFlamme	3:49

Side two
No.	Title	Writer(s)	Length
5.	"Bombay Calling"	Vince Wallace & D. LaFlamme	4:25
6.	"Bulgaria"	D. LaFlamme	6:10
7.	"Time Is"	D. LaFlamme	9:42

== Personnel ==
=== It's A Beautiful Day ===
- David LaFlamme – lead vocals, violin
- Linda LaFlamme – organ, piano, electric piano, celeste, harpsichord
- Hal Wagenet – guitar
- Mitchell Holman – bass
- Val Fuentes – drums
- Pattie Santos – vocals, tambourine, bells, block, gourd

=== Additional musician ===
- Bruce Steinberg – harmonica (track 2)

=== Production ===
- David LaFlamme – producer
- Brian Ross-Myring – engineer
- Col. John Walker, U.S.M.C. (Ret.) – manager
- Globe Propaganda – cover art
- Bruce Steinberg – photography

== Chart performance ==
=== Album ===
Chart	Year	Peak position	Total weeks
US Billboard 200	1969	47	70
UK Official Charts	1970	58	1
CA RPM Charts	1969	72	1

== Certifications ==
Region	Certification	Certified units/sales
United States (RIAA)	Gold	500,000^{^}
^{^} Shipments figures based on certification alone.
