= Fillmore (film) =

1972 film by Richard T. Heffron

- Fillmore DVD cover
- Directed by: Richard T. Heffron; Eli F. Bleich
- Produced by: Herbert F. Decker
- Starring: Bill Graham; Santana; Grateful Dead; Jefferson Airplane; Hot Tuna; Quicksilver Messenger Service
- Cinematography: Alan Capps; Albert Kihn; Paul Lohmann; Eric Saarinen
- Edited by: Eli F. Bleich; Richard Clarke; Daniel Halas; Charles Tetoni
- Distributed by: 20th Century Fox
- Release date: June 14, 1972
- Running time: 105 minutes
- Country: United States
- Language: English

Fillmore — also known as Fillmore: The Last Days, and as Last Days of the Fillmore — is a music documentary film, primarily shot at the Fillmore West auditorium in San Francisco, California, from June 29 through July 4, 1971. It was released on June 14, 1972.

Fillmore documents the final run of concerts at the Fillmore West, which closed after these shows. It features performances by several rock bands that emerged from the San Francisco music scene of the late 1960s and early 1970s, including Santana, the Grateful Dead, Jefferson Airplane, Hot Tuna, and Quicksilver Messenger Service. The film also contains extensive footage of concert promoter Bill Graham, who organized the concerts and ran the Fillmore West. Additionally, the film includes documentary footage shot several years earlier in and around San Francisco, showing the emergence of the music scene there amid the counterculture of the 1960s and the hippie movement.

Fillmore was shot on 16 mm film and was released in a widescreen format with a 2.35:1 aspect ratio. It makes frequent use of split-screen images.

== DVD ==
Fillmore was released on DVD by Rhino Records on June 2, 2009. At 94 minutes, the DVD version of the film differs from the original 105-minute theatrical release (released on VHS by All Star Video Corp.), omitting contentious scenes of Bill Graham's interactions with Boz Scaggs, Mike Wilhelm of The Charlatans and a performance of "I'll Be Long Gone" by Boz Scaggs.

== Album ==
Fillmore: The Last Days, a live album of music selected from the same run of concerts, was released as a three-disc vinyl LP box set in 1972. It was released as a two-disc CD in 1991. The audio version differs from the film significantly. The original box featured an actual Fillmore ticket, a poster, and a booklet with liner notes, pictures of some concert posters, and a list of all the Fillmore and Fillmore West concerts. Also included in the box is a single with a Bill Graham interview.

== Performers ==
The DVD version of Fillmore includes full or partial performances by these bands, in order of appearance:

- Lamb – "Hello Friends", "Isn't It Just a Beautiful Day"
- Cold Blood – "You Got Me Hummin'", "Wish I Knew How It Would Feel to Be Free"
- Hot Tuna – "Candy Man", "Uncle Sam Blues"
- The Rowan Brothers – rehearsal jam
- Quicksilver Messenger Service – "Fresh Air", "Mojo"
- Jefferson Airplane – "Volunteers", "We Can Be Together" *
- New Riders of the Purple Sage – rehearsal jam
- Grateful Dead – "Casey Jones", "Johnny B. Goode"
- It's a Beautiful Day – "White Bird"
- The Elvin Bishop Group – "The Sky Is Crying"
- Santana – "Incident at Neshabur", "In a Silent Way"

*Jefferson Airplane did not perform at the final series of concerts at the Fillmore West. The band's footage in the film is from another show.

== Concerts ==
The last concerts to take place at the Fillmore West, in 1971, were:

- Tuesday, June 29 – Sawbuck, Malo, Kwane and the Kwanditos
- Wednesday, June 30 – Boz Scaggs, Cold Blood, The Flamin' Groovies, Stoneground
- Thursday, July 1 – It's a Beautiful Day, The Elvin Bishop Group, Grootna, Lamb
- Friday, July 2 – Grateful Dead, New Riders of the Purple Sage, The Rowan Brothers
- Saturday, July 3 – Quicksilver Messenger Service, Hot Tuna, Yogi Phlegm
- Sunday, July 4 – Santana, Creedence Clearwater Revival, Tower of Power, various guest musicians

== See also ==
- List of American films of 1972
