= The Relix Bay Rock Shop, No. 1 =

Compilation album by New Riders of the Purple Sage
- Released: 1992
- Genre: Country rock
- Label: Relix

New Riders of the Purple Sage chronology
Midnight Moonlight (1992)	The Relix Bay Rock Shop, No. 1 (1992)	Live on Stage (1993)

Professional ratings
Review scores
Source	Rating
Allmusic	3/5 stars

The Relix Bay Rock Shop, No. 1 is an album by the country rock band the New Riders of the Purple Sage. It was originally distributed as a promotional radio program in 1992, and was also sold in record stores. It includes previously released songs selected from three New Riders albums, interviews with John Dawson, Tom Constanten, and others, and several advertisements (or "spots").

The albums excerpted on The Relix Bay Rock Shop, No. 1 are Before Time Began, Vintage NRPS, and Midnight Moonlight. Like The Relix Bay Rock Shop, No. 1 itself, they were released by Relix Records.

The two songs from Before Time Began were recorded in the studio in 1969 by the original lineup of the New Riders of the Purple Sage, which included Dawson, David Nelson, and three members of the Grateful Dead — Jerry Garcia, Mickey Hart, and Phil Lesh. The song from Vintage NRPS was recorded live in 1971, and also features Garcia, who played pedal steel guitar for the New Riders. The five songs from Midnight Moonlight were recorded in the studio in 1991.

== Track listing ==
1. Open – Collage – 2:12
2. Conversation – 1:40
3. "Louisiana Lady" (John Dawson) – 3:43
4. Conversation – 1:13
5. "Cecilia" (Dawson) – 3:49
6. Conversation – :18
7. Spot – Tom Constanten – 1:10
8. Spot – Arrowhead Ranch – 1:22
9. Conversation – 1:19
10. "Midnight Moonlight" (Peter Rowan) – 3:56
11. Conversation – :11
12. "All I Remember" (Erik Moll) – 3:10
13. Conversation – :11
14. Spot – Arrowhead Ranch – :58
15. Spot – New Riders of the Purple Sage – 1:09
16. Conversation – 1:10
17. "Henry" (Dawson) – 3:23
18. "Charlie's Garden" (Dawson) – 3:17
19. Conversation – :52
20. "Dirty Business" (Dawson) – 10:28
21. Conversation – :24
22. "Glendale Train" (Dawson) – 4:46
23. Close – 1:35

== Personnel ==
- John Dawson – guitar, vocals on "Louisiana Lady", "Cecilia", "Midnight Moonlight", "All I Remember", "Henry", "Charlie's Garden", "Dirty Business", "Glendale Train"
- David Nelson – guitar, vocals on "Cecilia", "Henry", "Dirty Business"
- Rusty Gauthier – guitar, mandolin, slide guitar, fiddle, banjo, vocals on "Louisiana Lady", "Midnight Moonlight", "All I Remember", "Charlie's Garden", "Glendale Train"
- Gary Vogensen – guitar, vocals on "Louisiana Lady", "Midnight Moonlight", "All I Remember", "Charlie's Garden", "Glendale Train"
- Jerry Garcia – pedal steel guitar on "Cecilia", "Henry", "Dirty Business"
- Phil Lesh – bass on "Cecilia", "Henry"
- Dave Torbert – bass on "Dirty Business"
- Fred Campbell – bass on "Louisiana Lady", "Midnight Moonlight", "All I Remember", "Charlie's Garden", "Glendale Train"
- Mickey Hart – drums on "Cecilia", "Henry"
- Spencer Dryden – drums on "Dirty Business"
- Evan Robert Morgan – lead acoustic guitar on "Charlie's Garden" and "Glendale Train"

== Original releases ==
The songs on The Relix Bay Rock Shop, No. 1 were originally released on the following albums:

- Before Time Began – "Cecilia", "Henry"
- Vintage NRPS – "Dirty Business"
- Midnight Moonlight – "Louisiana Lady", "Midnight Moonlight", "All I Remember", "Charlie's Garden", "Glendale Train"
