= The Chuck Wagon Gang =

Country gospel musical group

- Origin: Lubbock, Texas, U.S.
- Genres: Country, bluegrass, Gospel
- Years active: 1935–present
- Label: thoroughbredrecords.com
- Members: Shaye Smith; Melissa Kemper; Josh Garner; Nick Poe; Roger Newman
- Website: www.thechuckwagongang.net

The Chuck Wagon Gang is a Country gospel musical group, formed in 1935 by David P. ("Dad") Carter, oldest son Ernest ("Jim"), and two oldest daughters Lola ("Rose") and Effie ("Anna"). The group got their first radio break as sponsored singers for Bewley Flour in 1936. The "Gang" signed with Columbia Records and remained with them for 39 years, a world record that lasted until 2000, when Johnny Mathis' overall time with the same label (combining his signing in 1957 and re-signing in 1968) entered its 40th year. At one point they were Columbia's number one group with over 39 million in record sales.

The Chuck Wagon Gang has performed at Carnegie Hall, the Hollywood Bowl, and the Grand Ole Opry. The group has been inducted into the Gospel Music Hall of Fame and the Smithsonian Institution's classic American recordings.

== 1930s to 1970s ==
The group began broadcasting in 1935 from radio station KFYO in Lubbock, Texas, and took the name in 1936 when they moved to WBAP in Fort Worth. The original members sang together all the way to 1955 when Dad Carter retired, later dying in 1963, followed by Jim in 1971. Sons Eddie and Roy Carter stepped in to sing tenor and bass, respectively, which began the tradition of Carter siblings, children, and eventually grandchildren joining the Gang.

By the mid-1970s, the group was still touring part-time but felt a lack of support from the label they had recorded for during the previous three decades. Columbia had stopped servicing their songs to radio; thus, airplay had become non-existent. The decision was eventually made to move on from Columbia in the interest of rebuilding the group to a position akin to what it had enjoyed in years past. To that end, in 1979 they began recording for Copperfield Records and remained with that label for several years.

== 1980s to present day ==
After its relationship with Copperfield Records ended, the Chuck Wagon Gang began recording for Associated Artists. It was during this era that the group took advantage of its renewed popularity and, in keeping with the gospel sounds of the time, added a piano player to the lineup for live concerts. Fans responded positively to this sound, eventually culminating in the Gang receiving the "Best Gospel Group in Country Music" award at the Music City News Awards in 1988.

Roy approached Anna's granddaughter Shaye in 1993, asking her to assume the responsibility of singing soprano upon the retirement of member Debbie Trusty. Shaye accepted Roy's offer and sang soprano with the Gang until the retirement of alto singer Ruth Ellen Carter Yates a few years later, when she moved to her current position of alto singer. Roy subsequently retired, bringing about a new era for the Gang in which none of Dad Carter's children were members. As the 21st century dawned, the Gang sought to return to its origins, paring its sound back to the beautiful simplicity of four-part harmony accompanied by a single guitar. Once again, fans responded positively. As of January 2025, the Gang records for Thoroughbred Records, a division of Daywind Music Group. (Source: "Thoroughbred Records".)

== Members ==
"Website Bios".

- Shaye Smith – alto, manager/owner (1994–2007, 2010–) (granddaughter of original alto Anna Carter Gordon Davis)
- Melissa Kemper – soprano (2001–2006, 2015–)
- Josh Garner - tenor (2021–)
- Nick Poe – guitar, bass (2023–)
- Roger Newman - upright bass (2025-)

=== Former members ===
Original members:

- David P. (Dad) Carter – tenor, mandolin (1936–1955)
- Rose (Lola) Carter Karnes – soprano (1936–1975)
- Anna (Effie) Carter Gordon Davis – alto (1936–1975, 1978) (Married to former Governor Jimmie Davis of Louisiana from December 1968 until his death in November 2000)
- Jim (Ernest) Carter – bass, guitar (1936–1953, 1968–1970)

Others

- Louise Clark Porterfield
- Jim Waits
- Haskel "Hi-Pockets" Mitchell
- Eddie Carter
- Howard Gordon (Husband of Anna and the group's guitarist until his death in October 1967)
- Ronnie Crittenden
- Pat McKeehan
- Greg Gordon (Son of Anna Carter Gordon Davis) see Billboard Feb 3 1968.
- Vicki Gordon Owens (Daughter of Anna Carter Gordon Davis and mother of Shaye Smith)
- Ronnie Page
- Bettye Carter Goodwin
- Ruth Ellen Carter Yates
- Shirley Carter
- Patricia Neighbors
- Harold Timmons
- Debby Trusty
- Anita Saylor
- Kathy Watson
- Renée Martin
- Jim Wesson
- Rick Karnes
- Allen Thompkins
- Penny Greene Shelnut
- Kelly Jennings
- Dave Emery
- Julie Hudson
- Jeremy Stephens
- Kasey Owens (Granddaughter of Anna Carter Gordon Davis, daughter of Vicki Gordon Owens, and sister of Shaye Smith)
- Grant Owens (Grandson of Anna Carter Gordon Davis, son of Vicki Gordon Owens, and brother of Shaye Smith)
- Stan Hill
- Wyatt Austin
- Karl Smakula
- Scotty Owenby
- Darrell Morris
- Cody Shaneyfelt
- Roy Carter - Bass, Manager (1952 - 1997)

* Source 'CWG 70th Ann. CD Cover'

== Partial discography ==
- Favorite Country Hymns (1952)
- Joy to the World (1954)
- Sacred Songs (1957)
- O Why Not Tonight (1958)
- In The Garden (1958)
- I'll Walk And Talk With My Lord (1958)
- When The Sun Sets Over Jordan (1958)
- I'm Gonna See Heaven (1958)
- Sinner You'll Miss Heaven (1958)
- My Home Sweet Home (1958)
- The Chuck Wagon Gang (1959)
- Let's All Praise The Lord (1959)
- Prayers In Song (1959)
- Perfect Joy (1960)
- Sings The Songs Of Mosie Lister (1961)
- Sings The Songs Of Albert Brumley - God's Gentle People (1962)
- He Walks With Me (1963)
- That Old Time Religion (1964)
- The Chuck Wagon Gangs Best (1964)
- The Sunshine Special (1965)
- Joy Bells Ringing in My Soul (1965)
- Christmas with the Chuck Wagon Gang (1965; reissue of Joy to the World with two additional songs)
- Lord, Lead Me On (1966)
- Move Up to Heaven (1967)
- Songs of Faith & Glory (1967)
- The Glory Land Way (1967)
- Anna Gordon Of The Chuck Wagon Gang Sings Country Gospel Favorites (1968)
- Revival Time (1968)
- Rejoice (1969)
- Standing on the Rock (1969)
- The Chuck Wagon Gang's Greatest Hits (1969)
- Thank the Lord (1970)
- The Lord Said It (1970)
- Going Home for Christmas (1970)
- Down The Sawdust Trail (1971)
- Heaven Will Surely Be Worth It All (1971)
- I'm Rejoicing (1972)
- Hear The Gospel Story (1972)
- Springtime In Glory (1972)
- Oh What a Happy Day (1973)
- Over In Glory (1973)
- Camp Meetin' Time (1974)
- The Sweetest Songs We Know (1976)
- Looking Away To Heaven (1979)
- Family Tradition (1980)
- Jubilee (1985)
- Homecoming (1986)
- An Old-Fashioned Christmas At Home Volume 1 (1987)
- Memories Made New Volume 1 (1988)
- An Old-Fashioned Christmas At Home Volume 2 (1988)
- Memories Made New Volume 2 (1989)
- An American Tradition (1989)
- Someone To Talk To (1990)
- Greatest Hits - Volume 1 (1990)
- Old Time Hymns - Volume 1 (1990)
- Still Rollin' (1991)
- Keep On Keepin' On (1993)
- On Tour With Pat, Harold, Debby, Kathy, and Grady (1993)
- Leave The Light On (1995)
- He Knew Me (1996)
- Live In Lexington (1999)
- Gathered Together (2002)
- The Acoustic Sound of the Chuck Wagon Gang (2003)
- Live at Renfro Valley (2003)
- Live in Branson (2004)
- Through The Years (2004)
- Clinging to a Saving Hand (2005)
- Wagon Tracks Live (2005)
- Timeless Hymns (2006)
- 70th Anniversary CD (with Various Artists) (2006)
- Remembering the Old Songs (2007)
- I Have A Prayer (Remembering Anna) (2007)
- Reminiscing (2008)
- Keep Travelin' On (2009)
- Live In Pigeon Forge (2009)
- Country Gospel Treasures (2009)
- My Soul Shall Live On (2010)
- Down Home Country Christmas (2010)
- The Best Is Yet to Be (2011)
- The Chuck Wagon Gang Complete Recordings 1936–1955 (2014)
- Meeting in Heaven – The Chuck Wagon Gang Sings the Songs of Marty Stuart (2014)
- Rocking On The Waves (2018)
- No Depression In Heaven: The Gospel Songs Of The Carter Family (2019)
- Radio Days (2021)
- Come Go With Me (2023)
- Made To Live Forever (2025)

== Awards ==
- 1955: Disc Jockey Association Award - #1 Gospel Group in America
- 1984: Dad Carter was Inducted into the Gospel Music Association Hall of Fame
- 1986: SESAC Award - 50 Years of Recorded Gospel Music
- 1987: SESAC Award - Lifetime Achievement Award
- 1988, 1989: TNN/Music City News Award- Country Gospel Group of the Year
- 1989: Marvin Norcross Award
- 1991, 1992: TNN/Music City News Award- Country Gospel Group of the Year
- 1997: David Parker "Dad" Carter Inducted into the Southern Gospel Music Hall Of Fame
- 1998: Chuck Wagon Gang Inducted into the Gospel Music Association Hall of Fame
- 2005: Anna Carter Gordon Davis Inducted into the Southern Gospel Music Hall Of Fame
- 2006: Rose Carter Karnes Inducted into the Southern Gospel Music Hall Of Fame
- 2011: Roy Carter Inducted into the Southern Gospel Music Hall of Fame
- 2012: Chuck Wagon Gang Inducted into the Blue Ridge Music Hall Of Fame
- 2020: The Chuck Wagon Gang's 1948 Recording of "I'll Fly Away" Inducted into the Grammy Hall Of Fame
