= Orkustra =

The Orkustra was a San Francisco band that aimed to create a synthesis between symphonic sounds and psychedelic rock, resulting in what could be called free-form instrumental psychedelia. According to founding member Bobby Beausoleil, the group was originally known as The Electric Chamber Orchestra but this moniker was quickly changed to The Chamber Orkustra and then further shortened to The Orkustra to avoid limiting bookings to similarly small 'chamber' venues. The band existed for nearly a year before splitting up in the summer of 1967, during the so-called Summer of Love.

Beausoleil went on to work with underground filmmaker Kenneth Anger, playing the main role in the film Lucifer Rising. Not long after he became involved with Charles Manson and his 'family' cult in Los Angeles. Another prominent player in The Orkustra was violin prodigy David LaFlamme, who brought a certain grounding and resourcefulness to the outfit. He would co-found It's a Beautiful Day with his wife shortly after the group disbanded, bringing some of the same musical leanings to this new ensemble.

In an interview with Klemen Breznikar for It's Psychedelic Baby! Magazine in 2014, Beausoleil remarked, "Most of our compositions were structured in a similar way, too, where there would be a strong melody or musical pattern motif to provide a framework for the improvisations that so largely defined our music. However, we primarily influenced one another. David and Henry were classically trained, Terry was a jazz drummer, Jamie was into jazz and blues, and I brought more of a rock orientation and Asian influences to the mix. We learned from and took cues from one another to create a unique sound."

During their brief heyday the group released no recordings. Working in collaboration with Beausoleil, however, RD Records of Switzerland released an LP of original Orkustra recordings in 2006. A few years later, Kemado Records released an expanded compilation of Orkustra recordings supplemented by tapes former member David LaFlamme had privately preserved.

== Personnel ==
Core members

- Bobby Beausoleil – electric guitar, bouzouki (1966–1967)
- David LaFlamme – electric violin (1966–1967, died 2023)
- Henry Rasof – oboe (1966–1967, died 2022)
- Jaime Leopold – double bass (1966–1967, died 2018)
- Terry Wilson – drums, percussion (1966–1967)

== Discography ==
=== Compilation albums ===
- Light Shows For The Blind (RD Records, 2006)
- Adventures In Experimental Electric Orchestra From The San Francisco Psychedelic Underground (Mexican Summer, Kemado Records, 2009)
