= Ridin' with Panama Red =

Compilation album by New Riders of the Purple Sage
- Released: 2000
- Recorded: 1971–1974
- Genre: Country rock
- Label: Sony

New Riders of the Purple Sage chronology
Relix's Best of the New New Riders of the Purple Sage (1997)	Ridin' with Panama Red (2000)	Worcester, MA, 4/4/73 (2003)

Professional ratings
Review scores
Source	Rating
Allmusic	2.5/5 stars

Ridin' with Panama Red is an album by the country rock band the New Riders of the Purple Sage. It contains previously released songs selected from the New Riders' first six albums, which were recorded between 1971 and 1974. It was released in 2000 on the Sony Music Special Products label.

The songs on Ridin' with Panama Red were excerpted from New Riders of the Purple Sage (1971), Powerglide (1972), Gypsy Cowboy (1972), The Adventures of Panama Red (1973), Home, Home on the Road (1974), and Brujo (1974).

== Track listing ==
1. "Panama Red" (Peter Rowan) – 2:46 – from The Adventures of Panama Red
2. "I Don't Need No Doctor" (Nick Ashford, Valerie Simpson, Jo Armstead) – 4:41 – from Powerglide
3. "Ashes of Love" (Jack Anglin, Johnnie Wright) – 2:12 – from Brujo
4. "L.A. Lady" (Troy Seals, Donald Clint Goodman, Will Jennings) – 2:15 – from The Adventures of Panama Red
5. "Willie and the Hand Jive" (Johnny Otis) – 6:21 – from Powerglide
6. "Whatcha Gonna Do" (John Dawson) – 3:16 – from New Riders of the Purple Sage
7. "Long Black Veil" (Danny Dill, Marijohn Wilkin) – 3:54 – from Gypsy Cowboy
8. "Hello Mary Lou" (Gene Pitney, Cayet Mangiaracina) – 2:57 – from Home, Home on the Road
9. "Truck Drivin' Man" (Terry Fell) – 2:50 – from Home, Home on the Road
10. "Dead Flowers" (Mick Jagger, Keith Richards) – 4:03 – from Home, Home on the Road

== Personnel ==
=== New Riders of the Purple Sage ===
- John Dawson – guitar, vocals
- David Nelson – guitar, vocals
- Dave Torbert – bass, vocals on all songs except "Ashes of Love"
- Skip Battin – bass, vocals on "Ashes of Love"
- Buddy Cage – pedal steel guitar on all songs except "Watcha Gonna Do"
- Jerry Garcia – pedal steel guitar on "Watcha Gonna Do"
- Spencer Dryden – drums

=== Additional musicians ===
- Donna Jean Godchaux – vocals on "L.A. Lady", "Long Black Veil"
- Bill Kreutzmann – percussion on "I Don't Need No Doctor", "Willie and the Hand Jive"
- Nicky Hopkins – piano on "I Don't Need No Doctor", "Willie and the Hand Jive"
