= Winterland, San Francisco, CA, 12/31/77 =

Live album by New Riders of the Purple Sage
- Released: April 16, 2009
- Recorded: December 31, 1977
- Genre: Country rock
- Length: 86:12
- Label: Kufala
- Producer: Rob Bleetstein

New Riders of the Purple Sage chronology
Wanted: Live at Turkey Trot (2007)	Winterland, San Francisco, CA, 12/31/77 (2009)	Very Best of the Relix Years (2009)

Winterland, San Francisco, CA, 12/31/77 is an album by the country rock band the New Riders of the Purple Sage. It was recorded live on December 31, 1977, at the Winterland Ballroom in San Francisco, California. It was released on April 16, 2009. It was the sixth complete New Riders concert that was recorded in the 1970s and released in the 2000s as an album on the Kufala Recordings label.

== New Year's Eve at Winterland ==
On Tuesday, Thursday, Friday, and Saturday, December 27, 29, 30, and 31, 1977, the Grateful Dead performed at Winterland, in a run of concerts promoted by Bill Graham. Their opening act on New Year's Eve was the New Riders of the Purple Sage. During 1970 and 1971, the New Riders had often opened for the Dead, but this was the first time they had done so in the San Francisco Bay Area, their home territory, since the summer of 1974.

At the time of this concert, the New Riders' lineup consisted of John Dawson on guitar and vocals, David Nelson on guitar and vocals, Buddy Cage on pedal steel guitar, Stephen Love on bass and vocals, and Patrick Shanahan on drums. Dawson and Nelson had co-founded NRPS with Jerry Garcia in 1969. Cage had replaced Garcia on pedal steel when Garcia left the band in 1971. First Love, and then Shanahan, had joined the New Riders more recently; both were former members of Rick Nelson's Stone Canyon Band. Earlier in 1977 this lineup had released the studio album Marin County Line.

Most of the December 29 Grateful Dead concert, along with a few songs from December 30, was released as the album Dick's Picks Volume 10.

== Recording and sound quality ==
According to a statement on the back cover, the CD "was mastered directly from the original 2 track reel to reel analog master tapes recorded at 7.5 ips. We've done as much as possible to tame some of the over exuberant bass related sonic anomalies found on this recording."

The album was released in HDCD format. This provides enhanced sound quality when played on CD players with HDCD capability, and is fully compatible with regular CD players.

== Track listing ==
=== Disc one ===
1. "Hello Mary Lou" (Gene Pitney) – 3:18
2. "Little Old Lady" (Richard Wilbur) – 3:13
3. "Fifteen Days Under the Hood" (Jack Tempchin) – 4:34
4. "Love Has Strange Ways" (Stephen Love) – 5:44
5. "Henry" (John Dawson) – 4:46
6. "Home Grown" (Spencer Dryden) – 3:34
7. "One Too Many Stories" (Dawson) – 3:25
8. "Red Hot Women and Ice Cold Beer" (Cy Coben) – 3:35
9. "Oh What a Night" (Love) – 4:04
10. "Little Miss Bad" (Dawson) – 3:09

=== Disc two ===
1. "Jasper" (Dawson, David Nelson) – 2:57
2. "Louisiana Lady" (Dawson) – 3:32
3. "T for Texas" (Jimmie Rodgers) – 4:56
4. "Portland Woman" (Dawson) – 13:44
5. "Crooked Judge" (Robert Hunter, Nelson) – 5:09
6. "You Never Can Tell" (Chuck Berry) – 5:44
7. "Glendale Train" (Dawson) – 5:43
8. "Dead Flowers" (Mick Jagger, Keith Richards) – 4:44

== Personnel ==
=== New Riders of the Purple Sage ===
- John Dawson – rhythm guitar, vocals
- David Nelson – lead guitar, vocals
- Buddy Cage – pedal steel guitar
- Stephen Love – bass guitar, vocals
- Patrick Shanahan – drums

=== Production ===
- Rob Bleetstein – producer
- Betty Cantor-Jackson – recording
- Jeffrey Norman – mastering
- Bob Minkin – cover photo
