= David LaFlamme =

American musician (1941–2023)

- Born: David Gordon LaFlamme; May 4, 1941; New Britain, Connecticut, U.S.
- Died: August 6, 2023 (aged 82) Santa Rosa, California, U.S.
- Genres: Psychedelic rock; proto-prog; folk rock; classical; jazz-rock
- Instruments: Vocals; violin; guitar; flute
- Years active: 1960s–2020s
- Formerly of: It's a Beautiful Day; The Orkustra; Dan Hicks and His Hot Licks; Edge City; Love Gunn; Clouds; David LaFlamme Band

David Gordon LaFlamme (May 4, 1941 – August 6, 2023) was an American singer and violinist best known for co-founding the San Francisco band It's a Beautiful Day.

== Life and career ==
LaFlamme was born in New Britain, Connecticut, on May 4, 1941. His mother was from a Mormon family in Salt Lake City, and when he was eight years old, the family moved there to be near her family. LaFlamme had been studying violin since moving to Los Angeles at age five, and in Salt Lake City he won a competition to perform as soloist with the Utah Symphony Orchestra.

After briefly serving in the U.S. Army, he returned to the music scene in San Francisco in 1962. During the 1960s he performed with a wide variety of notable San Francisco artists, such as Jerry Garcia and Janis Joplin. He helped create the band Electric Chamber Orkustra, soon shortened to The Orkustra, and later, an early version of Dan Hicks and His Hot Licks. Then in the summer of 1967, he and his wife Linda LaFlamme formed It's a Beautiful Day with the help of impresario Matthew Katz.

The band's debut album, It's a Beautiful Day, was recorded in Los Angeles and produced by David LaFlamme. Released by Columbia Records in 1969, it contains their biggest hit, "White Bird". The album reached number 47 in the U.S. charts and remained on the Billboard Top 200 charts for over a year, achieving Gold Record certification in November 1972. Following their divorce and the recording of this seminal album, Linda LaFlamme left the band to pursue other musical ventures.

The group's second album, Marrying Maiden, was released the following year. It was their most successful on the charts, reaching number 28 in the U.S. and number 45 in the U.K. After two additional albums, Choice Quality Stuff/Anytime and Live at Carnegie Hall, LaFlamme left the group in 1972 over disputes regarding the direction and management of the band.

For a time he performed with the groups Edge City and Love Gunn in the Bay Area before going solo. In 1976, he released the album White Bird on Amherst Records. His remake of the song "White Bird" cracked the Billboard Hot 100, peaking at number 89 that same year. This was followed by the album Inside Out in 1978, also on Amherst Records. Both project releases were co-produced by David LaFlamme and Mitchell Froom.

Under LaFlamme's leadership, It's a Beautiful Day reformed periodically for reunions and special concerts. The group first reunited in 1978 to perform at Chet Helms' Tribal Stomp at the Greek Theatre in Berkeley, California, a show which featured future wife Linda Baker (using the stage name Dominique Dellacroix) on backing vocals. Additional reunion events were consummated between 1996 and 1999 featuring original members of the band.

From 2000, he performed with a reconstituted group under the name David LaFlamme Band that included his third wife, Linda Baker LaFlamme, and original Beautiful Day drummer Val Fuentes. After years of legal wrangling over ownership of the band's name, LaFlamme resumed formal use of It's a Beautiful Day when former manager Matthew Katz let the trademark of the name go unrenewed.

LaFlamme appeared on the television shows Frasier, Ellen, and Wings, as a strolling violinist who stands right at the table in a restaurant, playing loudly or annoyingly. He also contributed to Jefferson Starship's 2008 release, Jefferson's Tree of Liberty.

In later years, LaFlamme suffered from Parkinson's disease. He died in Santa Rosa, California, on August 6, 2023, at the age of 82.

== Discography ==
=== It's a Beautiful Day albums ===
- It's a Beautiful Day (Columbia Records, 1969) US Album Chart No. 47 / UK Album Chart No. 58 / CA Album Chart No. 72 / US RIAA: Gold
- Marrying Maiden (Columbia Records, 1970) US Album Chart No. 28 / UK Album Chart No. 45 / CA Album Chart No. 35
- Choice Quality Stuff / Anytime (Columbia Records, 1971) US Album Chart No. 130
- At Carnegie Hall (Live) (Columbia Records, 1972) US Album Chart No. 144
- Last Flight (Live at the Fillmore West in 1971) (Big Sur Records, 1996)
- Creed of Love (Live at the Fillmore West in 1971) (Strawberry Records, It's About Music, 1998)
- Original Demos 1968 (It's About Music, 2013)
- Live at the Fillmore '68 (Live) (Classic Music Vault, 2013), with DVD The David LaFlamme Story

=== It's a Beautiful Day compilations ===
- A Thousand and One Nights (CBS Records, 1973) (UK Import)
- Rock Giants (CBS Records, 1982) (German/Dutch Import)
- Greatest Hits (TRC Records, 1995) (German Import)
- The Best of It's a Beautiful Day (It's About Music, 2001)
- The Columbia Years 1969-1973 (Limited Edition Box Set) (Muskrat Records, 2008) (Japanese Import)

=== Solo albums ===
- White Bird (Amherst Records, 1976)
- Inside Out (Amherst Records, 1978)
- Workin' the Gold Mine (Live) (David & Linda LaFlamme) (It's About Music, Classic Music Vault, 2000)
- Beyond Dreams (David LaFlamme Band) (Repertoire Records, It's About Music, Classic Music Vault, 2003)
- Hot Summer Days - San Francisco Nights (David LaFlamme Band) (Non-labeled, 2004)
- Live in Seattle (Live) (David LaFlamme Band) (It's About Music, 2004)
- Misery Loves Company (David LaFlamme Band) (It's About Music, 2005)

== Sources ==
- Interview with David LaFlamme (1998)
- Interview with David LaFlamme (2003)
