= Lamb (rock band) =

San Francisco-based rock group

- Origin: San Francisco, California, United States
- Genres: Rock
- Years active: 1969–1973
- Members: Barbara Mauritz; Bob Swanson

Lamb was a San Francisco-based rock group. They tend to be remembered only for their appearance on the Fillmore: The Last Days concert album, where they were one of several non-star artists on a set dominated by bigger names like the Grateful Dead, Santana, and Jefferson Airplane. They also played at the Ribeltad Vorden in San Francisco. They issued three albums: A Sign of Change (Fillmore, 1970), Cross Between (Warner Bros., 1971) and Bring Out The Sun (Warner Bros., 1971 - Billed as: Barbara Mauritz & Lamb). Photographer Peter Olwyler created the album cover images used on "Cross Between" and "Bring Out the Sun."

Lamb was formed by the duo of Texan singer Barbara Mauritz and (multi-instrumentalist though primarily guitarist) Bob Swanson, who with Mauritz (writing both separately and together) were responsible for the band's material.

Their music blended jazz, folk music, singer-songwriter pop, gospel, and even some classical and avant-garde influences. Reminiscent in spots of such varied artists as Tim Buckley, Judy Collins (in her art-song phase), David Ackles, and Savage Rose (in that band's most gospel-soaked period), their records were ultimately idiosyncratic enough to defy ready comparison to anyone.

Their debut album on the Fillmore label, A Sign of Change, was perhaps their most uncompromising and experimental, relying largely on jazz-folk acoustic arrangements and spotlighting Mauritz's impressive voice on impressionistic, dream-like lyrics.

Tracks:

- 01. Traveler's Observation (Bob Swanson/Barbara Mauritz) - 5:05
- 02. Adventures Of The Incredible Mr. Sandman (Barbara Mauritz) - 2:35
- 03. In Dreams (Bob Swanson/Barbara Mauritz) - 5:35
- 04. Barbara's Soul II (Bob Swanson/Bill Douglass/Barbara Mauritz) - 5:10
- 05. The Odyssey Of Ehram Spickor (Bob Swanson/Barbara Mauritz) - 3:11
- 06. Preacher's Holiday (Bob Swanson/Barbara Mauritz) - 7:54
- 07. Where I'm Bound (Barbara Mauritz) - 6:57

Band Members:

- Barbara Mauritz - vocals, guitar, tambourine
- Bob Swanson - guitar
- Bill Douglass - double bass
- David Litwin - wind and string arrangements
- Walter Papaport - shepherd
- Diva Goodfriend-Koven - flute
- Robert Hubbard - English horn
- Douglas Blumenstock - cello
- Ed Bogas - viola
- David Rubinson - producer

Of their followup, Cross Between, AllMusic wrote: "Lamb's second album used some far more conventional elements of electric rock production than their starker debut had, which in some ways made this follow-up more mainstream and less striking. On the other hand, the songs themselves were more eclectic, and complemented well by the greater textural depth of the arrangements. Most importantly, the songwriting continued to be as inspired and unusual as it had been on A Sign of Change, and only slightly less abstract, again mixing jazz, folk, impressionistic singer/songwriter rock, gospel, and classical, though in different proportions." (1)

Tracks:

- 01. Flying (Barbara Mauritz) - 2:35
- 02. Now's Not The Time (Barbara Mauritz) - 3:37
- 03. Cross Between (Barbara Mauritz) - 3:40
- 04. Sleepwalkers (Bob Swanson, Barbara Mauritz) - 5:41
- 05. Reach High (Jeffrey Cain, Jerry Corbett) - 4:03
- 06. Ku (Bob Swanson, Barbara Mauritz) - 4:57
- 07. While Waiting (Bob Swanson, Barbara Mauritz) - 3:54
- 08. Flotation (Barbara Mauritz) - 4:29
- 09. Milo And The Travelers (Bob Swanson, Barbara Mauritz) - 6:12

Band Members:

- Barbara Mauritz - keyboards, vocals, producer
- Bob Swanson - guitar, banjo, producer
- David Hayes - bass
- Jerry Garcia- banjo (01), pedal steel (05,08)
- Bill Atwood - trumpet
- Ed Bogus - viola
- Ellen Dessier
- Bill Douglas - bass
- Lawrence Duckles
- Ed Jang
- Dick Fenner
- Kenneth Goldsmith
- Tom Heimberg
- Mitchell Howie
- Robert Hughes
- Anne Kish
- Gordon Messick
- Lawrence Sousa
- Germaine Wallace
- Walter Rapaport, Fred Catero - producers

Regarding the last Lamb album, Bring Out The Sun, AllMusic wrote, "Whether it was the intention of Barbara Mauritz or someone on the business side of her affairs, Bring Out the Sun leaves the impression that she was being groomed for a solo career. The impression is hardly subtle or accidental: the album is co-billed to Barbara Mauritz and Lamb, and although Lamb co-founder Bob Swanson is still aboard as guitarist and (on half of the tracks) as a sole or collaborating composer, there are some songs on which he doesn't play at all. Lamb's second album, Cross Between, had a much higher proportion of gospel-oriented material than their debut, and Bring Out the Sun continues the move to contemporary gospel-rock of sorts, particularly on side one. As a consequence, it's by a considerable margin the most mainstream of Lamb's albums..." (1)

Tracks:

- 01. Old Fashioned Remedy (Barbara Mauritz) - 4:23
- 02. The Wish (Barbara Mauritz) - 1:54
- 03. Rap with Rhyme (Bob Swanson) - 4:33
- 04. River Boulevard (Barbara Mauritz) - 3:09
- 05. How Am I Gonna Manage? (Barbara Mauritz, Bob Swanson) - 3:24
- 06. Visions of Blackbirds (Barbara Mauritz) - 1:50
- 07. Salty (Barbara Mauritz, Bob Swanson) - 8:22
- 08. The Vine (Barbara Mauritz) - 3:04
- 09. Live to Your Heart (Bob Swanson) - 3:34

Mauritz went on to record as a solo artist, putting out Music Box for Columbia Records in 1972. Her solo career didn't take off, however, although she continued to perform and write (composing the music for many commercials) and appearing/composing on the 1974 Soundtrack album for the film Where the Lilies Bloom. She died on April 14, 2014, in San Francisco, California.
