= Boston Music Hall, 12/5/72 =

Live album by New Riders of the Purple Sage
- Released: November 11, 2003
- Recorded: December 5, 1972
- Genre: Country rock
- Length: 97:46
- Label: Kufala
- Producer: Rob Bleetstein

New Riders of the Purple Sage chronology
Worcester, MA, 4/4/73 (2003)	Boston Music Hall, 12/5/72 (2003)	Veneta, Oregon, 8/27/72 (2004)

Professional ratings
Review scores
Source	Rating
Allmusic	4/5 stars
Jambands.com	(favorable)

Boston Music Hall, 12/5/72 is an album by the country rock band the New Riders of the Purple Sage. It was recorded live on December 5, 1972, at the Music Hall in Boston, Massachusetts, and released on November 11, 2003. It was the second complete New Riders concert that was recorded in the 1970s and released in the 2000s as an album on the Kufala Recordings label.

Eric Andersen was the opening act at the Boston show. He sat in with the New Riders for their encore — his own song "I Love to Sing My Ballad, Mama" and the Rolling Stones' "Honky Tonk Women".

The album cover photo of the band was taken on or about the date of the concert, and depicts, from left to right, Spencer Dryden, Dave Torbert, John "Marmaduke" Dawson, David Nelson, and Buddy Cage.

== Recording and sound quality ==
According to a statement on the back cover, the CD "was mastered directly from the original half track analog reel to reel tapes, recorded at 7.5 ips. What you hear on the 30+ year-old tapes is the way it went down."

== Track listing ==
=== Disc one ===
1. "Truck Drivin' Man" (Terry Fell) – 3:23
2. "Whatcha Gonna Do" (John Dawson) – 3:24
3. "Hello Mary Lou" (Gene Pitney, Cayet Mangiaracina) – 3:18
4. "Rainbow" (Dawson) – 3:07
5. "Down in the Boondocks" (Joe South) – 3:26
6. "Portland Woman" (Dawson) – 6:38
7. "She's No Angel" (Wanda Ballman, J.W. Arnold) – 3:07
8. "School Days" (Chuck Berry) – 4:19
9. "Henry" (Dawson) – 4:21
10. "Long Black Veil" (Danny Dill, Marijohn Wilkin) – 4:20
11. "Sailin'" (Dawson) – 3:05
12. "Contract" (Dave Torbert) – 3:26
13. "Glendale Train" (Dawson) – 5:05
14. "Louisiana Lady" (Dawson) – 3:54

=== Disc two ===
1. "I Don't Know You" (Dawson) – 4:38
2. "Sutter's Mill" (Dawson) – 3:18
3. "Groupie" (Torbert) – 3:43
4. "Whiskey" (Dawson) – 3:14
5. "Last Lonely Eagle" (Dawson) – 5:48
6. "Willie and the Hand Jive" (Johnny Otis) – 13:27
7. "I Love to Sing My Ballad, Mama (But They Only Wanna Hear Me Rock 'n' Roll)" (Eric Andersen) – 3:09
8. "Honky Tonk Women" (Mick Jagger, Keith Richards) – 5:21

== Personnel ==
=== New Riders of the Purple Sage ===
- John Dawson – rhythm guitar, vocals
- David Nelson – lead guitar, vocals
- Dave Torbert – bass guitar, vocals
- Buddy Cage – pedal steel guitar
- Spencer Dryden – drums, percussion

=== Additional musicians ===
- Eric Andersen – guitar, vocals on "I Love to Sing My Ballad, Mama" and "Honkey Tonk Women"

=== Production ===
- Rob Bleetstein – producer
- Bill Culhane – recording
- Stephen Barncard – mastering
