= Worcester, MA, 4/4/73 =

Live album by New Riders of the Purple Sage
- Released: May 20, 2003
- Recorded: April 4, 1973
- Genre: Country rock
- Length: 115:41
- Label: Kufala
- Producer: Rob Bleetstein

New Riders of the Purple Sage chronology
Ridin' with Panama Red (2000)	Worcester, MA, 4/4/73 (2003)	Boston Music Hall, 12/5/72 (2003)

Professional ratings
Review scores
Source	Rating
Allmusic	3/5 stars
Jambands.com	(favorable)

Worcester, MA, 4/4/73 is an album by the country rock band the New Riders of the Purple Sage. It was recorded live at Clark University in Worcester, Massachusetts on April 4, 1973. It was released on May 20, 2003. It was the first of a series of albums that were released on the Kufala Recordings label in the 2000s and that contain complete New Riders concerts recorded in the 1970s.

Two members of the Grateful Dead sat in with the New Riders at the Worcester concert. Keith Godchaux played piano for the entire show, and Donna Jean Godchaux sang lead vocals on the Loretta Lynn song "You Ain't Woman Enough", and backing vocals on the ballad "Long Black Veil". The New Riders played nineteen original songs and six covers, a total of almost two hours of music.

== Recording and sound quality ==
According to a statement on the back cover, the CD "was mastered directly from the original half track analog reel to reel tapes, recorded at 7.5 ips. While capturing the band at a fine point in time, the 30-year-old tapes may at certain points exhibit some imperfections due to the ravages of time."

== Track listing ==
=== Disc one ===
1. "I Don't Know You" (John Dawson) – 3:48
2. "Lochinvar" (Dawson) – 5:06
3. "Rainbow" (Dawson) – 3:11
4. "It's Alright With Me" (Dave Torbert) – 3:51
5. "Sailin'" (Dawson) – 3:01
6. "Whatcha Gonna Do" (Dawson) – 3:04
7. "California Day" (Torbert) – 2:53
8. "Linda" (Dawson) – 3:33
9. "Groupie" (Torbert) – 2:32
10. "One Too Many Stories" (Dawson) – 6:07
11. "Contract" (Torbert) – 3:59
12. "Teardrops in My Eyes" (Red Allen, Tommy Sutton) – 2:58
13. "Long Black Veil" (Danny Dill, Marijohn Wilkin) – 4:29
14. "You Ain't Woman Enough" (Loretta Lynn) – 3:24
15. "Whiskey" (Dawson) – 3:30

=== Disc two ===
1. "Dirty Business" (Dawson) – 10:08
2. "Down in the Boondocks" (Joe South) – 3:36
3. "Hello Mary Lou" (Gene Pitney, Cayet Mangiaracina) – 2:56
4. "You Should Have Seen Me Runnin'" (Dawson) – 4:42
5. "Portland Woman" (Dawson) – 6:57
6. "Henry" (Dawson) – 4:37
7. "Glendale Train" (Dawson) – 5:24
8. "Last Lonely Eagle" (Dawson) – 6:19
9. "Louisiana Lady" (Dawson) – 3:50
10. "Willie and the Hand Jive" (Johnny Otis) – 11:29

== Personnel ==
=== New Riders of the Purple Sage ===
- John Dawson – rhythm guitar, vocals
- David Nelson – lead guitar, vocals
- Dave Torbert – bass guitar, vocals
- Buddy Cage – pedal steel guitar
- Spencer Dryden – drums, percussion

=== Additional musicians ===
- Keith Godchaux – piano
- Donna Jean Godchaux – lead vocal on "You Ain't Woman Enough", harmony vocal on "Long Black Veil"

=== Production ===
- Rob Bleetstein – producer
- Mike Zasuly – recording
- Rich Winter – mastering
