= Keep On Keepin' On (Chuck Wagon Gang album) =

Studio album by The Chuck Wagon Gang

Studio album by The Chuck Wagon Gang
- Released: 1993
- Genre: Gospel; Country
- Label: Copperfield

The Chuck Wagon Gang chronology
Christmas with the Chuck Wagon Gang (1993)	Keep On Keepin' On (1993)	In Harmony (1994)

Professional ratings
Review scores
Source	Rating
Allmusic	2/5 stars

Keep On Keepin' On is a 1993 album by the Chuck Wagon Gang. The composition of the four-part country and gospel harmony for the album was led by Carter family members Roy Carter and his sisters Ruth Ellen Yates and Betty Goodwin, and for the first time, his daughter Shirley. The album was on music charts for 11 weeks, and the year 1993 marked the last of six years in a row that the Chuck Wagon Gang was named Gospel Artist or Group of the Year by Nashville's Music City News.

== Track listing ==
1. "Keep On Keepin' On"
2. "Just a Closer Walk with Thee"
3. "On the Wings of My Victory"
4. "Bring Back the Songs"
5. "The World Needs a Melody"
6. "Sing Me a Going Home Song"
7. "The Great Speckled Bird"
8. "See That Light on Yonder Mountain"
9. "Show a Little Bit of Love and Kindness"
10. "Country Sunday"
