= Linda LaFlamme =

American musician, composer, and keyboardist (1939–2024)

- Born: Linda Sue Rudman; April 13, 1939; St. Louis, Missouri, U.S.
- Died: October 23, 2024 (aged 85) Harrisonburg, Virginia, U.S.
- Genres: Psychedelic rock, folk rock, jazz-rock
- Instruments: Keyboards, electric piano, vocals
- Years active: 1960s–1970s
- Formerly of: It's a Beautiful Day, Titus' Mother, A Thought in Passing
- Spouse: David LaFlamme (m. 1964; div. 1968)

Linda LaFlamme (née Rudman; April 13, 1939 – October 23, 2024) was an American musician, composer, and keyboardist who co-founded the rock band It's a Beautiful Day in 1967. She co-wrote several of the band's songs, including "White Bird," before pursuing a career with other musical projects and composing for theater.

== Early life ==
Linda Sue Rudman, later known as Linda LaFlamme, was born on April 13, 1939, in St. Louis, Missouri, as the middle of three children to Edward Leonid Rudman and Annette Miller. She was classically trained in piano and harpsichord but later gravitated toward jazz and rock and roll. She graduated with a bachelor's degree in English from the University of Wisconsin in 1961.

== Career ==
In 1963, Linda Rudman moved to San Francisco where she met David LaFlamme, an Army veteran and violinist who had performed with the Utah Symphony. The pair formed a romantic and musical partnership, marrying in 1964 and co-founding the band It's a Beautiful Day in 1967 with the assistance of manager Matthew Katz.

The band began performing in Seattle, where the LaFlammes wrote "White Bird" in early 1968 while living in challenging conditions. The song became the opening track of the band’s debut album, released by Columbia Records in 1969, alongside other compositions by the LaFlammes, including "Hot Summer Day" and "Girl With No Eyes." The album reached No. 47 on the Billboard charts, and achieved Gold Record certification in 1972.

Following their divorce and the recording of this seminal album, Linda LaFlamme left It’s a Beautiful Day to pursue other musical ventures. She founded the band Titus' Mother in St. Louis before establishing A Thought in Passing in Oakland, California, in 1972. A Thought in Passing performed original material composed by LaFlamme and appeared in venues such as the Opaterny Ballet Theater in Mountain View, California. During the late 1970s, she transitioned into composing music for theatrical productions in the San Francisco Bay Area.

== Personal life ==
Linda adopted the Hebrew name Neska after her divorce from David LaFlamme. They had one daughter, Kira LaFlamme, and two granddaughters. In her later years, she lived in Harrisonburg, Virginia, where she died on October 23, 2024, due to vascular dementia. She experienced a stroke earlier in the year.
