= White Bird (song) =

1969 song by It's a Beautiful Day

- Original 1969 single cover

Single by It's a Beautiful Day

from the album It's a Beautiful Day
- B-side: "Wasted Union Blues"
- Released: July 1969
- Recorded: 1969
- Studio: CBS Studios (Los Angeles)
- Genre: Psychedelic rock; folk rock
- Length: 3:02 (single); 6:06 (album)
- Label: Columbia (4-44928)
- Songwriters: David LaFlamme, Linda LaFlamme
- Producer: David LaFlamme

It's a Beautiful Day singles chronology
"Bulgaria" (1968)	"White Bird" (1969)	"Soapstone Mountain" (1970)

Audio sample
- file; help

Music video
- "White Bird" (live) on YouTube

"White Bird"

Single by David LaFlamme

from the album White Bird
- B-side: "Spirit of America"
- Released: November 1976
- Recorded: 1976
- Studio: Record Plant (Sausalito)
- Genre: Psychedelic rock
- Length: 3:33 (single); 4:08 (album)
- Label: Amherst Records (AM-717)
- Songwriters: David LaFlamme, Linda LaFlamme
- Producers: David LaFlamme, Mitchell Froom

David LaFlamme singles chronology
"White Bird" (1976)	"Easy Woman" (1977)

"White Bird" is a 1969 song by San Francisco rock group It's a Beautiful Day, written by members David LaFlamme and Linda LaFlamme.

== Background and arrangement ==
"White Bird" was written in December 1967, in Seattle, Washington. Manager Matthew Katz had moved the band there to polish their act at a Seattle venue before booking them into San Francisco nightclubs. Living in the attic of a Victorian house across the street from Volunteer Park, the band had inadequate food and no transportation during a rainy and cloudy Seattle winter. The song evolved from the depression of the band's circumstances and yearning to be free.

In a later interview, LaFlamme said:

Where the 'white bird' thing came from ... We were like caged birds in that attic. We had no money, no transportation, the weather was miserable. We were just barely getting by on a very small food allowance provided to us. It was quite an experience, but it was very creative in a way.

The song was arranged and produced by David LaFlamme and sung as a duet between him and group member Patti Santos. A prominent stylistic feature of the song's original arrangement are multiple violin parts overdubbed by LaFlamme.

== Release and reception ==
It was first released on the band's 1969 eponymous debut album It's a Beautiful Day by Columbia Records.

The song quickly became the band's signature tune and a staple of FM Album-oriented rock radio. The album rose to Number 47 on the Billboard 200 album chart. Following the popularity of the album track, a single version was edited and remixed for radio play, with a running time of 3:02, and released on October 4, 1969. It rose to as high as Number 3 the week of October 18, 1969 on San Francisco radio station KYA. The single never reached a wide national audience and only made it to Number 118 on Billboard's Bubbling Under the Hot 100 chart.

A nearly 10-minute-long version also appeared on the 1972 live album It's a Beautiful Day at Carnegie Hall. It later appeared on nine compilation albums and four more retrospective albums.

== Legacy ==
The song was prominently featured in the surf movie Winds of Change in 1970 (retitled The Sunshine Sea the following year), produced by filmmakers Greg MacGillivray and Jim Freeman.

David LaFlamme remade "White Bird" as the title cut for his 1976 solo album debut, with his future wife Linda Baker - credited as Dominique Dellacroix - providing the backing vocal. Released as a single, this version brought the song to the Hot 100 of Billboard for the first time, its chart peak being Number 89.

The song is featured in the first season of Knight Rider in the episode of the same name (Season 1, Episode 19, 4 March 1983). The song also featured in two further episodes of Knight Rider: "Let it Be Me" (Season 2, Episode 23, 13 May 1984) and "The Scent of Roses" (Season 4, Episode 12, 3 January 1986). In all three episodes, it represented the love theme between the characters of Michael Knight and Stephanie 'Stevie' Mason (who had the surname alias of March in the second season episode).

It was also used in the soundtrack of A Walk on the Moon, a 1999 American drama about a married woman's infidelity starring Diane Lane, Anna Paquin, and Viggo Mortensen, including Woodstock Music Festival scenes.

Love Battery recorded "White Bird" in 1995, their version being featured on the multi-artist album Star Power!

A version of "White Bird" by violinist Vanessa-Mae was released in 2001, and reached number 66 in the UK Singles Chart.

Sam Bush covered the song on his 2006 Laps in Seven album.

The Strangelings recorded "White Bird" for their 2007 album Season of the Witch.

Judy Collins recorded "White Bird" as a new track on her 2021 compilation album release White Bird - Anthology of Favorites.

The song was also used in Adult World, a 2013 American film comedy starring Emma Roberts, Evan Peters, and John Cusack.

Most recently it was used in the 2015 film Focus, starring Will Smith and Margot Robbie, and in 2017, the premiere PBS-TV episode of Prime Suspect: Tennison.
