= It's a Beautiful Day =

American band formed in San Francisco in 1967

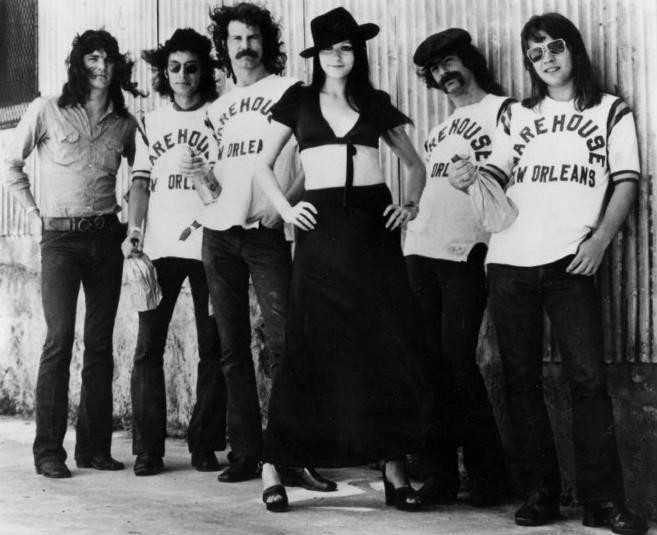
- The band in 1972.

Background information
- Origin: San Francisco, California, United States
- Genres: Psychedelic rock, proto-prog, folk rock, classical, jazz-rock
- Years active: 1967–1973, 1996–present
- Labels: CBS, Columbia
- Members: Val Fuentes; Linda Baker LaFlamme; Toby Gray; Rob Espinosa; Gary Thomas; Michael Prichard
- Past members: David LaFlamme; Pattie Santos; Linda LaFlamme; Mitchell Holman; Hal Wagenet; Fred Webb; Tom Fowler; Bill Gregory; Bud Cockrell; Greg Bloch; Larry Blackshere; Rob Cunningham

It's a Beautiful Day is an American band formed in San Francisco, California, in 1967, featuring violinist David LaFlamme and his wife, Linda LaFlamme, on keyboards, and vocalist Pattie Santos.

David LaFlamme, who as a youth had once performed as a soloist with the Utah Symphony Orchestra, had previously been in the group Orkustra playing five-string violin. The other members of It's a Beautiful Day in its early years were Val Fuentes (drums), Mitchell Holman (bass) and Hal Wagenet (guitar). Although they were one of the notable San Francisco bands to emerge from 1967's Summer of Love, the group never achieved the level of success that contemporaries such as the Grateful Dead, Jefferson Airplane, and Santana did, with whom they had connections. The band created a unique blend of rock, jazz, folk, country, classical, and world-beat styles.

== Early history: 1967–1969 ==
The band's original manager, Matthew Katz, had previously worked with the rock bands Jefferson Airplane and Moby Grape. The members of the band were unaware that the other two bands were already trying to end their business relationships with Katz. During 1967 and early 1968, Katz prevented It's a Beautiful Day from performing in San Francisco, telling them they were not ready. He booked their first public appearances at a club he controlled in Seattle, Washington, formerly known as the Encore Ballroom. Katz renamed the club San Francisco Sound. While in Seattle, the group lived in the attic of an old house leased by Katz while writing and rehearsing new songs in between club performances. Few customers came to the club during the band's six week engagement in Seattle between December 1967 and January 1968.

The band's signature song "White Bird" was inspired by the experiences David and Linda LaFlamme had while living in Seattle. The song was partly inspired by Seattle's rainy winter weather. In a later interview, David LaFlamme said:

Where the 'white bird' thing came from ... We were like caged birds in that attic. We had no money, no transportation, the weather was miserable. We were just barely getting by on a very small food allowance provided to us. It was quite an experience, but it was very creative in a way.

By the time the group members returned to San Francisco they had no money and were frustrated by Katz's attempts to manipulate their career. In desperation, they began playing at a few clubs without his approval. They also began a long process of trying to disentangle themselves from his control. The band gradually gained some recognition and earned some money. Some of that recognition came from their performance at the Sky River Rock Festival and Lighter Than Air Fair, occurring over the 1968 Labor Day weekend in Sultan, Washington. Sky River is considered by many to be the first successful multi-day rock festival, and a number of major bands had the opportunity to hear It's a Beautiful Day there. The group got its first big break when offered a chance to open for Cream at the Oakland Coliseum, in Oakland, California, on October 4, 1968, during that group's farewell tour.

The band's debut album, It's a Beautiful Day, was produced by David LaFlamme in Los Angeles, California, and released by Columbia Records in 1969. It remained on the Billboard Top 200 charts for 70 continuous weeks, and achieved Gold Record certification in November 1972. This LP features tracks such as "White Bird", "Hot Summer Day", and "Time Is". The album reached number 47 in the U.S. charts and number 58 in the UK. The theme from the song "Bombay Calling" was later used, at a slower tempo, by Deep Purple as the intro to "Child in Time" on its Deep Purple in Rock album. The band retaliated by recording "Don & Dewey" which was, to all intents and purposes, identical to Deep Purple's "Wring That Neck". The vocals and violin playing of David LaFlamme plus Santos' singing attracted FM-radio-play attention, and nationally, "White Bird" bubbled under Billboard's Hot 100 chart, peaking at number 118.

== 1970s and beyond ==
By 1970, the original lineup of the band had changed; the LaFlammes had split up and Linda left the band and was replaced by Fred Webb. On July 5, 1970, the band played the second Atlanta International Pop Festival in Byron, Georgia, to an estimated 250,000 people. The group's second album, Marrying Maiden, recorded at Pacific High Recording Studios in San Francisco, was released in 1970. It was their most successful on the charts, reaching number 28 in the U.S. and number 45 in the U.K. In that same year, the band performed at the Holland Pop Festival at the Kralingse Bos in Rotterdam, Netherlands, and at the Bath Festival of Blues and Progressive Music in Somerset, England.

It's a Beautiful Day was one of the last acts to appear at the Fillmore West in San Francisco in July 1971. Its performance of "White Bird" was featured as part of the musical documentary film Fillmore, released the following year. Mitchell Holman and Hal Wagenet left in the summer of 1971, later forming the group Natural Act with songwriter Tim Dawe. They were replaced by bassist Tom Fowler (later with Frank Zappa) and guitarist Bill Gregory. Their first performance was broadcast live on San Francisco's KSAN FM radio, with host Tom Donahue introducing them as the band's two new members.

The group released their third album, Choice Quality Stuff/Anytime, in 1971, followed by the live album, It's a Beautiful Day at Carnegie Hall, in 1972. Tom Fowler left that same year. Citing exhaustion, and with differences arising over the direction and management of the band among band members, David LaFlamme resigned later in 1972. It's a Beautiful Day...Today was recorded and released the following year, and the band toured until the summer of 1973 when it split up. A large factor in the group's decision to break up was over renewed litigation brought by Matthew Katz.

Replacement bassist and vocalist James "Bud" Cockrell would help form Pablo Cruise shortly thereafter, and violinist Gregory Bloch joined the Italian progressive rock group Premiata Forneria Marconi and later the Saturday Night Live Band. Fred Webb became a member of the Bay Area band Stoneground later in 1973, while Bill Gregory returned to the club circuit in New Orleans, eventually releasing a solo album It's a Bluesy Day in 1980. Val Fuentes went on to play with a number of groups including the country rock band New Riders of the Purple Sage during much of the 1980s. After her earlier departure, Linda LaFlamme formed the jazz-rock ensemble Titus' Mother which evolved into A Thought in Passing by 1972.

In 1976, David LaFlamme released his first solo project with Amherst Records. Included on this album was a new version of "White Bird" which finally cracked the Billboard Hot 100, peaking at number 89. Pattie Santos, who had formed Cockrell & Santos with her husband, former bassist Bud Cockrell, in 1977, was killed in a car crash near Geyserville in Sonoma County, California, on December 14, 1989. Cockrell himself died in 2010.

It's a Beautiful Day reformed occasionally for reunions and special concerts. They performed at Chet Helms' Tribal Stomp at the Greek Theatre in Berkeley, California, in 1978. This outdoor show featured Linda Baker (under the stage name Dominique Dellacroix) on vocals with Mitchell Froom guesting on keyboards. A series of additional reunion concerts were later performed between 1996 and 1999, the band augmented by Larry Blackshere on vibes and keyboards.

The band's music continued under the name David LaFlamme Band as well as It's a Beautiful Day until Katz let his trademark of the name go unrenewed, and the use of It's a Beautiful Day was formally resumed.

From 2000, It's a Beautiful Day featured founder David LaFlamme and original drummer Fuentes. Other band members were LaFlamme's then-current wife, whom he met in 1973, Linda Baker LaFlamme (vocals), Toby Gray (bass), Gary Thomas (keyboards), Rob Espinosa (guitar), and Michael Prichard (percussion). This line-up was the longest continual group that has ever performed the band's material. In 2014, Rob Cunningham replaced Espinosa on lead guitar. Rob Espinosa returned as lead guitar in 2018.

In 2009 David LaFlamme began playing with the Phil Lawrence Band and transformed the group into It's a Beautiful Day Acoustic. The band played acoustic versions of the best-known originals from the early albums, plus instrumental originals by Phil Lawrence on the mandolin. They performed until the pandemic shutdown in March 2020.

In later years, David LaFlamme suffered from Parkinson's disease. He died in Santa Rosa, California, on August 6, 2023, at the age of 82.

Linda LaFlamme died from vascular dementia on October 23, 2024, at the age of 85.

== Personnel ==
Current members

- Linda Baker LaFlamme – lead and backing vocals, percussion (1978, 1996–present)
- Val Fuentes – drums, backing vocals, occasional lead vocals (1967–1973, 1978, 1996–present)
- Toby Gray – bass, harmonica, backing vocals (1980–1985, 2000–present)
- Gary Thomas – keyboards, backing vocals (2000–present)
- Rob Espinosa – guitar, backing vocals (2000–2014, 2018–present)
- Michael Prichard – percussion (2006–present)

Former members

- David LaFlamme – lead and backing vocals, violin, rhythm guitar, flute (1967–1972, 1978, 1996–2023; died 2023)
- Pattie Santos – lead and backing vocals, percussion (1967–1973; died 1989)
- Linda LaFlamme – keyboards (1967–1969; died 2024)
- Mitchell Holman – bass, harmonica, backing vocals, occasional lead vocals (1967–1971, 1978, 1996–1999)
- Hal Wagenet – guitar (1968–1971, 1978, 1996–1999)
- Fred Webb – keyboards, French horn, harp, backing vocals, occasional lead vocals (1969–1973; died 1989)
- Tom Fowler – bass (1971–1972; died 2024)
- Bill Gregory – guitar (1971–1973)
- Bud Cockrell – lead and backing vocals, bass (1972–1973; died 2010)
- Greg Bloch – violin, mandolin (1972–1973; died 1989)
- Larry "Lord" Blackshere – electric vibraphone, keyboards (1996–1999; died 2002)
- Rob Cunningham – guitar, backing vocals (2014–2018)

Timeline

== Discography ==
=== Studio albums ===
- It's a Beautiful Day (Columbia Records, 1969) US LP Chart No. 47 / UK LP Chart No. 58 / CA LP Chart No. 72 / US RIAA: Gold
- Marrying Maiden (Columbia Records, 1970) US LP Chart No. 28 / UK LP Chart No. 45 / CA LP Chart No. 35
- Choice Quality Stuff/Anytime (Columbia Records, 1971) US LP Chart No. 130
- It's a Beautiful Day...Today (Columbia Records, 1973) US LP Chart No. 114

=== Other albums ===
- At Carnegie Hall (Live) (Columbia Records, 1972) US LP Chart No. 144
- White Bird (David LaFlamme) (Amherst Records, 1976)
- Inside Out (David LaFlamme) (Amherst Records, 1978)
- Last Flight (Live at the Fillmore West in 1971) (Big Sur Records, 1996)
- Creed of Love (Live at the Fillmore West in 1971) (Strawberry Records, It's About Music, 1998)
- Workin' the Gold Mine (Live) (David & Linda LaFlamme) (It's About Music, Classic Music Vault, 2000)
- Beyond Dreams (David LaFlamme Band) (Repertoire Records, It's About Music, Classic Music Vault, 2003)
- Hot Summer Days - San Francisco Nights (David LaFlamme Band) (Non-labeled, 2004)
- Live in Seattle (Live) (David LaFlamme Band) (It's About Music, 2004)
- Misery Loves Company (David LaFlamme Band) (It's About Music, 2005)
- Original Demos 1968 (It's About Music, 2013)
- Live at the Fillmore '68 (Live) (Classic Music Vault, 2013), with DVD The David LaFlamme Story

=== Compilation albums ===
- A Thousand and One Nights (CBS Records, 1973) (UK Import)
- The Best of It's a Beautiful Day (CBS/Sony, 1973) (Japan only)
- Rock Giants (CBS Records, 1982) (German/Dutch Import)
- Greatest Hits (TRC Records, 1995) (German Import)
- It's a Beautiful Day / Marrying Maiden (Sony Music, 1998) (UK Import)
- The Best of It's a Beautiful Day (It's About Music, 2001)
- Choice Quality Stuff / Today (Estrella Rockera, 2004) (Spanish Import)
- The Columbia Years 1969-1973 (Limited Edition Box Set) (Muskrat Records, 2008) (Japanese Import)

=== Singles ===
- "Bulgaria" / "Aquarian Dream" (1968) San Francisco Sound 11680
- "White Bird" / "Wasted Union Blues" (1969) Columbia 44928
- "Soapstone Mountain" / "Good Lovin'" (1970) Columbia 45152
- "The Dolphins" / "Do You Remember the Sun" (1970) Columbia 45309
- "Anytime" / "Oranges and Apples" (1972) Columbia 45536
- "White Bird" / "Wasted Union Blues" (1973) Columbia 45788
- "Ain't That Lovin' You Baby" / "Time" (1973) Columbia 45853

== See also ==
- List of bands from the San Francisco Bay Area
