= Keep On Keepin' On (New Riders of the Purple Sage album) =

Studio album by New Riders of the Purple Sage
- Released: 1989
- Genre: Country rock
- Length: 33:02
- Label: Mu
- Producer: Boots Hughston

New Riders of the Purple Sage chronology
Vintage NRPS (1986)	Keep On Keepin' On (1989)	Midnight Moonlight (1992)

Professional ratings
Review scores
Source	Rating
Allmusic	2/5 stars

Keep On Keepin' On is the twelfth studio album by the country rock band the New Riders of the Purple Sage. It was released in 1989 by Mu Records, and subsequently re-released by Relix Records.

Keep On Keepin' On is the first of two studio albums by the New Riders to feature only one original member of the band, John Dawson, the second being 1992's Midnight Moonlight. It includes a version of the Grateful Dead song "Friend of the Devil", which was co-written by Dawson.

The album is more influenced by folk-rock and bluegrass music than the band's previous efforts, partly due to the contributions of multi-instrumentalist Rusty Gauthier.

== Track listing ==
1. "Keep On Keepin' On" (John Dawson) – 3:33
2. "Now I Call It Love" (Dawson) – 2:46
3. "It's O.K. to Cry" (Val Fuentes, Rusty Gauthier, Lina Valentino) – 3:18
4. "Bounty Hunter" (Fuentes, Gauthier, Valentino) – 4:01
5. "Barbaric Splendor" (Joe New) – 3:19
6. "Señorita" (Dawson) – 3:00
7. "Night of the Living Lonely" (Johnson, New) – 2:58
8. "Rancher's Daughter" (Dawson) – 3:02
9. "Big Ed" (Gauthier) – 3:17
10. "Friend of the Devil" (Dawson, Jerry Garcia, Robert Hunter) – 3:36

== Personnel ==
=== New Riders of the Purple Sage ===
- John Dawson – acoustic guitar, jaw harp, lead and background vocals
- Rusty Gauthier – acoustic guitar, lap steel guitar, dobro, fiddle, banjo, twelve-string guitar, lead and background vocals
- Gary Vogensen – electric guitar, background vocals
- Greg Lagardo – drums
- Michael White – bass

=== Additional musicians ===
- Jennifer Hall – background vocals
- Jeanette Sartain – background vocals
- Carolyn Gauthier – background vocals
- Boots Hughston
- Kincaid Miller
- Lina Valentino
- Val Fuentes
- Bill Amatneek
- Stu Feldman
- Bing Nathan
- Bob Black

=== Production ===
- Boots Hughston – producer, executive producer, mixing
- Bob Heyman – executive producer
- Ricky Lynd – engineer, mixing
- Wendy Bardsley – second engineer
- Jamie Bridges – sub-engineer
- Tom Flye – mixing
- Bob Missbach – mixing
- Mixed at Hyde Street Studios, San Francisco
