= Vintage NRPS =

Live album by New Riders of the Purple Sage
- Released: 1986
- Recorded: 1971
- Genre: Country rock
- Length: 45:45
- Label: Relix
- Producer: David Nelson

New Riders of the Purple Sage chronology
Before Time Began (1986)	Vintage NRPS (1986)	Keep On Keepin' On (1989)

Jerry Garcia chronology
Run for the Roses (1982)	Vintage NRPS (1986)	Keystone Encores (1988)

Professional ratings
Review scores
Source	Rating
Allmusic	2/5 stars

Vintage NRPS is an album by the country rock group the New Riders of the Purple Sage. It was recorded live on February 21 and February 23, 1971 at the Capitol Theater in Port Chester, New York, and released in 1986.

At the time of the Capitol Theatre shows, the New Riders of the Purple Sage were regularly performing as the opening act for the Grateful Dead. Jerry Garcia was a member of both bands. Garcia would play pedal steel guitar with the New Riders, then play electric guitar and sing with the Dead. A Grateful Dead concert from the same set of shows as Vintage NRPS was released as the album Three from the Vault.

== Track listing ==
All the songs were written by John Dawson, except "Honky Tonk Women" by Mick Jagger and Keith Richards.

1. "I Don't Know You" – 3:41
2. "Cecilia" – 4:13
3. "Whatcha Gonna Do" – 3:02
4. "Dirty Business" – 11:20
5. "Fair Chance to Know" – 4:10
6. "Garden of Eden" – 6:31
7. "Portland Woman" – 5:08
8. "Honky Tonk Women" – 5:29

== Credits ==
=== New Riders of the Purple Sage ===
- Jerry Garcia – pedal steel guitar
- John Dawson – acoustic guitar, vocals
- David Nelson – electric guitar, vocals
- Dave Torbert – bass guitar, vocals
- Spencer Dryden – drums

=== Production ===
- Engineer – David Luke
- Producer – David Nelson
- Cover painting – David Nelson
- Back photo – Herb Greene
- Graphics Assistance – Tim Harris, Dewey Reid – Fine Line Design
- Color Separations – Summerfield Graphics
