= Live on Stage (New Riders of the Purple Sage album) =

Live album by New Riders of the Purple Sage
- Released: 1993
- Recorded: 1975
- Genre: Country rock
- Label: Relix

New Riders of the Purple Sage chronology
The Relix Bay Rock Shop, No. 1 (1992)	Live on Stage (1993)	Live in Japan (1994)

Professional ratings
Review scores
Source	Rating
Allmusic	3/5 stars

Live on Stage is an album by the country rock band the New Riders of the Purple Sage. It was recorded live in 1975 at the Beacon Theatre in New York City and at the Keystone in Berkeley, California. It was released by Relix Records in 1993.

== The history of Live on Stage ==
Tracks 1–6 were recorded on November 14 and/or November 15, 1975, at the Beacon Theatre in New York. Tracks 7–10 were recorded on May 17, 1975, at the Keystone in Berkeley.

Bluegrass fiddle player Vassar Clements sits in on two songs: "Glendale Train" and "Nadine".

The cover photo, by Mary Ann Mayer, depicts, from left to right, Spencer Dryden, John "Marmaduke" Dawson, David Nelson, Skip Battin, and Buddy Cage.

According to a statement by Dawson on the back cover, "This CD was originally released in Europe in 1992 without my permission. Not only that, the New Riders and the authors of the songs haven't seen any royalties, and probably won't from the release. Because of that I decided that we should release it 'legally'. The material here is quite enjoyable, and I like it! I hope you do too!"

== Track listing ==
1. "Panama Red" (Peter Rowan) – 3:17
2. "Little Old Lady" (Richard Wilbur) – 3:16
3. "Austin, Texas" (Skip Battin) / "Instant Armadillo Blues" (John Dawson) – 5:18
4. "Henry" (Dawson) – 5:00
5. "Glendale Train" (Dawson) – 5:31
6. "Nadine" (Chuck Berry) – 6:39
7. "Singing Cowboy" (Battin) – 4:39
8. "Take a Letter Maria" (R. B. Greaves) – 5:14
9. "I Will Never Make You Blue" (C. Cline, R. Cline) – 4:03
10. "La Bamba" (traditional, arranged by Ritchie Valens) – 4:52

== Personnel ==
=== New Riders of the Purple Sage ===
- John Dawson – guitar, vocals
- David Nelson – guitar, vocals
- Buddy Cage – pedal steel guitar
- Skip Battin – bass, vocals
- Spencer Dryden – drums

=== Additional musicians ===
- Vassar Clements – fiddle on "Glendale Train" and "Nadine"

=== Production ===
- Dave Tamarkin – tape archivist
- Mary Ann Mayer – cover photographer
