= Midnight Moonlight =

Studio album by New Riders of the Purple Sage
- Released: May 12, 1992
- Genre: Bluegrass; folk
- Length: 48:06
- Label: Relix
- Producer: Rusty Gauthier, John Dawson

New Riders of the Purple Sage chronology
Keep On Keepin' On (1989)	Midnight Moonlight (1992)	The Relix Bay Rock Shop, No. 1 (1992)

Midnight Moonlight is the thirteenth studio album by the New Riders of the Purple Sage, released in 1992 on the Relix Records label.

Midnight Moonlight features studio recordings of original and cover songs, performed in a style heavily influenced by bluegrass and American folk music. The instrumentation is largely acoustic, with no drums. This is in contrast to most earlier New Riders albums, which emphasized electric country rock.

== Track listing ==
1. "Midnight Moonlight" (Peter Rowan) – (4:10)
2. "Sutter's Mill" (John Dawson) – (3:25)
3. "Charlie's Garden" (Dawson) – (3:23)
4. "All I Remember" (Eric Moll, Karren Pell) – (3:23)
5. "Louisiana Lady" (Dawson) – (4:30)
6. "Ballad of the Deportees" (Woody Guthrie) – (3:23)
7. "Taking It Hard" (Joe New) – (4:26)
8. "Glendale Train" (Dawson) – (5:09)
9. "Change in the Weather" (Dawson) – (4:09)
10. "Diesel on My Tail" (Jim Fagan) – (3:05)
11. "Lonesome L.A. Cowboy" (Rowan) – (8:37)

== Personnel ==
=== New Riders of the Purple Sage ===
- John Dawson – acoustic guitar, vocals
- Rusty Gauthier – acoustic guitar, slide guitar, mandolin, fiddle, banjo, dumbek, vocals
- Gary Vogensen – electric guitar, vocals
- Fred Campbell – bass, acoustic guitar

=== Additional musicians ===
- Keith Allen – acoustic guitar, slide guitar, vocals
- Norton Buffalo – harmonica, tambourine
- Carolyn Gauthier – vocals
- Bill Laymon – acoustic bass guitar
- Evan Morgan – acoustic guitar
- David Nelson – mandolin, acoustic guitar
- John Pedersen – banjo, uilleann pipes
- Kevin Wimmer – fiddle, Cajun accordion

=== Production ===
- Rusty Gauthier, John Dawson – producers
- Rusty Gauthier – recording and mixing
