= Val Fuentes =

American drummer (born 1947)

- Born: November 25, 1947 (age 78); Chicago, Illinois, U.S.
- Instrument: Drums

Val Fuentes (born November 25, 1947) is the original and current drummer for the folk and rock band It's a Beautiful Day. He has also played with Fat Chance, New Riders of the Purple Sage, Shadowfax, Lina Valentino, Linda Imperial, The Pure Pleasure Band, and The Moments.

Fuentes lives in California and plays shows with David LaFlamme (until LaFlamme's death in 2023) and It's a Beautiful Day, as well as several other local Sonoma County bands such as The Zins, a rock and funk group.

He has a son.
