= List of songs covered by the Beatles =

The Beatles were an English rock band from Liverpool, Lancashire, England. With members John Lennon, Paul McCartney, George Harrison and Ringo Starr, the group is often considered the most influential band of the rock era. While active between 1960 and 1970, the group recorded hundreds of songs, with their "main catalogue" consisting of 211 songs, which include 186 originals and 25 covers. Since their break-up, a further 41 covers the Beatles recorded as a group have been released.

== The Beatles ==
Song	Year	Beatles album	Original artist	Ref.
"Anna (Go to Him)"	1963	Please Please Me	Arthur Alexander	
"Chains"	1963	Please Please Me	The Cookies	
"Boys"	1963	Please Please Me	The Shirelles	
"Baby It's You"	1963	Please Please Me	The Shirelles	
"A Taste of Honey"	1963	Please Please Me	Scott/Marlow	
"Twist and Shout"	1963	Please Please Me	The Top Notes	
"Till There Was You"	1963	With the Beatles	Sue Raney	
"Please Mr. Postman"	1963	With the Beatles	The Marvelettes	
"Roll Over Beethoven"	1963	With the Beatles	Chuck Berry	
"You Really Got a Hold on Me"	1963	With the Beatles	The Miracles	
"Devil in Her Heart"	1963	With the Beatles	The Donays	
"Money (That's What I Want)"	1963	With the Beatles	Barrett Strong	
"Long Tall Sally"	1964	Long Tall Sally (EP)	Little Richard	
"Slow Down"	1964	Long Tall Sally (EP)	Larry Williams	
"Matchbox"	1964	Long Tall Sally (EP)	Carl Perkins	
"Rock and Roll Music"	1964	Beatles for Sale	Chuck Berry	
"Mr. Moonlight"	1964	Beatles for Sale	Dr. Feelgood	
"Kansas City/Hey-Hey-Hey-Hey!"	1964	Beatles for Sale	Little Willie Littlefield/Little Richard	
"Words of Love"	1964	Beatles for Sale	Buddy Holly	
"Honey Don't"	1964	Beatles for Sale	Carl Perkins	
"Everybody's Trying to Be My Baby"	1964	Beatles for Sale	Carl Perkins	
"Bad Boy"	1965	Beatles VI	Larry Williams	
"Act Naturally"	1965	Help!	Buck Owens	
"Dizzy Miss Lizzy"	1965	Help!	Larry Williams	
"Maggie Mae"	1970	Let It Be	The Vipers Skiffle Group (traditional)	
"Hippy Hippy Shake"	1977	Live! at the Star-Club in Hamburg, Germany; 1962	Chan Romero	
"Sweet Little Sixteen"	1977	Live! at the Star-Club in Hamburg, Germany; 1962	Chuck Berry	
"Lend Me Your Comb"	1977	Live! at the Star-Club in Hamburg, Germany; 1962	Carl Perkins	
"Your Feet's Too Big"	1977	Live! at the Star-Club in Hamburg, Germany; 1962	The Ink Spots	
"Bésame Mucho"	1977	Live! at the Star-Club in Hamburg, Germany; 1962	Jimmy Dorsey	
"Reminiscing"	1977	Live! at the Star-Club in Hamburg, Germany; 1962	Buddy Holly	
"Nothin' Shakin'"	1977	Live! at the Star-Club in Hamburg, Germany; 1962	Eddie Fontaine	
"To Know Her Is to Love Her"	1977	Live! at the Star-Club in Hamburg, Germany; 1962	The Teddy Bears	
"Little Queenie"	1977	Live! at the Star-Club in Hamburg, Germany; 1962	Chuck Berry	
"Falling in Love Again (Can't Help It)"	1977	Live! at the Star-Club in Hamburg, Germany; 1962	Marlene Dietrich	
"Red Sails in the Sunset"	1977	Live! at the Star-Club in Hamburg, Germany; 1962	Lew Stone	
"I'm Talking About You"	1977	Live! at the Star-Club in Hamburg, Germany; 1962	Chuck Berry	
"Shimmy Like Kate"	1977	Live! at the Star-Club in Hamburg, Germany; 1962	Original Memphis Five	
"I Remember You"	1977	Live! at the Star-Club in Hamburg, Germany; 1962	Jimmy Dorsey	
"I'm Gonna Sit Right Down and Cry (Over You)"	1977	Live! at the Star-Club in Hamburg, Germany; 1962	Roy Hamilton	
"Where Have You Been (All My Life)"	1977	Live! at the Star-Club in Hamburg, Germany; 1962	Arthur Alexander	
"Sheila"	1977	Live! at the Star-Club in Hamburg, Germany; 1962	Tommy Roe	
"I Got a Woman"	1994	Live at the BBC	Ray Charles	
"Too Much Monkey Business"	1994	Live at the BBC	Chuck Berry	
"Keep Your Hands Off My Baby"	1994	Live at the BBC	Little Eva	
"Young Blood"	1994	Live at the BBC	The Coasters	
"A Shot of Rhythm and Blues"	1994	Live at the BBC	Arthur Alexander	
"Sure to Fall (In Love with You)"	1994	Live at the BBC	Carl Perkins	
"Some Other Guy"	1994	Live at the BBC	Richie Barrett	
"That's All Right, Mama"	1994	Live at the BBC	Elvis Presley	
"Carol"	1994	Live at the BBC	Chuck Berry	
"Soldier of Love (Lay Down Your Arms)"	1994	Live at the BBC	Arthur Alexander	
"Clarabella"	1994	Live at the BBC	The Jodimars	
"Crying, Waiting, Hoping"	1994	Live at the BBC	Buddy Holly	
"The Honeymoon Song"	1994	Live at the BBC	Marino Marini	
"Johnny B. Goode"	1994	Live at the BBC	Chuck Berry	
"Memphis, Tennessee"	1994	Live at the BBC	Chuck Berry	
"Lucille"	1994	Live at the BBC	Little Richard	
"Lonesome Tears in My Eyes"	1994	Live at the BBC	Johnny Burnette and His Rock 'n' Roll Trio	
"Glad All Over"	1994	Live at the BBC	Carl Perkins	
"I Just Don't Understand"	1994	Live at the BBC	Ann-Margret	
"So How Come (No One Loves Me)"	1994	Live at the BBC	The Everly Brothers	
"I Forgot To Remember To Forget"	1994	Live at the BBC	Elvis Presley	
"I Got to Find My Baby"	1994	Live at the BBC	Chuck Berry	
"Ooh! My Soul"	1994	Live at the BBC	Little Richard	
"Don't Ever Change"	1994	Live at the BBC	The Crickets	
"That'll Be the Day"	1995	Anthology 1	The Crickets	
"Hallelujah I Love Her So"	1995	Anthology 1	Ray Charles	
"Ain't She Sweet"	1995	Anthology 1	Lou Gold	
"Searchin'"	1995	Anthology 1	The Coasters	
"Three Cool Cats"	1995	Anthology 1	The Coasters	
"The Sheik of Araby"	1995	Anthology 1	Vincent Lopez	
"Shout"	1995	Anthology 1	The Isley Brothers	
"Leave My Kitten Alone"	1995	Anthology 1	Little Willie John	
"Rip It Up/Shake, Rattle and Roll/Blue Suede Shoes"	1996	Anthology 3	Little Richard/Big Joe Turner/Carl Perkins	
"Mailman, Bring Me No More Blues"	1996	Anthology 3	Buddy Holly	
"Beautiful Dreamer"	2013	On Air – Live at the BBC Volume 2	Tony Orlando (based on the Stephen Foster song)	
"Happy Birthday Dear Saturday Club"	2013	On Air – Live at the BBC Volume 2	Mildred J. Hill, Patty Hill (traditional)	
"Saint Louis Blues"	2018	The Beatles: 50th Anniversary Edition	W. C. Handy	
"(You're So Square) Baby I Don't Care"	2018	The Beatles: 50th Anniversary Edition	Elvis Presley	
"Blue Moon"	2018	The Beatles: 50th Anniversary Edition	Glen Gray	
"The Walk"	2021	Let It Be: Special Edition	Jimmy McCracklin	
"Without a Song"	2021	Let It Be: Special Edition	Paul Whiteman	
"God Save the Queen"	2022	Get Back – The Rooftop Performance	(traditional)	

== Solo ==
=== John Lennon ===
Song	Year	Album	Original artist	Ref.
"Blue Suede Shoes"	1969	Live Peace in Toronto 1969	Carl Perkins	
"Money (That's What I Want)"	1969	Live Peace in Toronto 1969	Barrett Strong	
"Dizzy Miss Lizzy"	1969	Live Peace in Toronto 1969	Larry Williams	
"Well (Baby Please Don't Go)"	1972	Some Time in New York City	The Olympics	
"Ya Ya"	1974	Walls and Bridges	Lee Dorsey	
"Be-Bop-A-Lula"	1975	Rock 'n' Roll	Gene Vincent	
"Stand by Me"	1975	Rock 'n' Roll	Ben E. King	
"Rip It Up"/"Ready Teddy"	1975	Rock 'n' Roll	Little Richard	
"You Can't Catch Me"	1975	Rock 'n' Roll	Chuck Berry	
"Ain't That a Shame"	1975	Rock 'n' Roll	Fats Domino	
"Do You Wanna Dance?"	1975	Rock 'n' Roll	Bobby Freeman	
"Sweet Little Sixteen"	1975	Rock 'n' Roll	Chuck Berry	
"Slippin' and Slidin'"	1975	Rock 'n' Roll	Little Richard	
"Peggy Sue"	1975	Rock 'n' Roll	Buddy Holly	
"Bring It On Home to Me"/"Send Me Some Lovin'"	1975	Rock 'n' Roll	Sam Cooke/Lloyd Price	
"Bony Moronie"	1975	Rock 'n' Roll	Larry Williams	
"Just Because"	1975	Rock 'n' Roll	Lloyd Price	
"Hound Dog"	1986	Live in New York City	Big Mama Thornton	
"Angel Baby"	1986	Menlove Ave.	Rosie and the Originals	
"Since My Baby Left Me"	1986	Menlove Ave.	Arthur Crudup	
"To Know Her Is to Love Her"	1986	Menlove Ave.	The Teddy Bears	
"Maggie Mae"	1998	John Lennon Anthology	The Vipers Skiffle Group (traditional)	
"Long Lost John"	1998	John Lennon Anthology	Alan Lomax (traditional)	
"A Kiss Is Just A Kiss"	1998	John Lennon Anthology	Dooley Wilson	
"Ain't She Sweet"	1998	John Lennon Anthology	Milton Ager/Jack Yellen	
"Be My Baby"	1998	John Lennon Anthology	The Ronettes	
"Only You"	1998	John Lennon Anthology	The Platters	
"Honey Don't"	2010	John Lennon Signature Box	Carl Perkins	
"Johnny B. Goode"	2021	John Lennon/Plastic Ono Band: The Ultimate Collection	Chuck Berry	
"Glad All Over"	2021	John Lennon/Plastic Ono Band: The Ultimate Collection	Carl Perkins	
"Goodnight Irene"	2021	John Lennon/Plastic Ono Band: The Ultimate Collection	Lead Belly	
"You'll Never Walk Alone"	2021	John Lennon/Plastic Ono Band: The Ultimate Collection	Christine Johnson	
"It'll Be Me"	2021	John Lennon/Plastic Ono Band: The Ultimate Collection	Jerry Lee Lewis	
"Matchbox"	2021	John Lennon/Plastic Ono Band: The Ultimate Collection	Carl Perkins	
"Mystery Train"	2021	John Lennon/Plastic Ono Band: The Ultimate Collection	Elvis Presley	
"(You're So Square) Baby I Don't Care"	2021	John Lennon/Plastic Ono Band: The Ultimate Collection	Elvis Presley	

=== Paul McCartney ===
Song	Year	Album	Original artist	Ref.
"Love Is Strange"	1971	Wild Life	Mickey & Sylvia	
"Crossroads Theme"	1975	Venus and Mars	Tony Hatch	
"Rudolph the Red-Nosed Reggae"	1979	Wonderful Christmastime single	Gene Autry	
"Lucille"	1981	Concerts for the People of Kampuchea	Little Richard	
"Long Tall Sally"	1987	Recorded Highlights Of The Prince's Trust 10th Anniversary Birthday Party	Little Richard	
"Kansas City"	1988	CHOBA B CCCP	Little Willie Littlefield	
"Twenty Flight Rock"	1988	CHOBA B CCCP	Eddie Cochran	
"Lawdy, Miss Clawdy"	1988	CHOBA B CCCP	Lloyd Price	
"Bring It On Home to Me"	1988	CHOBA B CCCP	Sam Cooke	
"Don't Get Around Much Anymore"	1988	CHOBA B CCCP	Duke Ellington	
"I'm Gonna Be a Wheel Someday"	1988	CHOBA B CCCP	Bobby Mitchell	
"That's All Right (Mama)"	1988	CHOBA B CCCP	Arthur Crudup	
"Summertime"	1988	CHOBA B CCCP	Abbie Mitchell	
"Ain't That a Shame"	1988	CHOBA B CCCP	Fats Domino	
"Crackin' Up"	1988	CHOBA B CCCP	Bo Diddley	
"Just Because"	1988	CHOBA B CCCP	Nelstone's Hawaiians	
"Midnight Special"	1988	CHOBA B CCCP	Otto Gray and his Oklahoma Cowboys	
"It's Now or Never"	1990	The Last Temptation of Elvis	Elvis Presley	
"Matchbox"	1990	Tripping the Live Fantastic	Carl Perkins	
"Sally"	1990	Tripping the Live Fantastic	Gracie Fields	
"Don't Let the Sun Catch You Crying"	1990	Tripping the Live Fantastic	Ernie Andrews	
"All My Trials"	1990	Tripping the Live Fantastic: Highlights!	Bob Gibson	
"I'm in Love Again"	1991	CHOBA B CCCP (International Release)	Fats Domino	
"Be-Bop-a-Lula"	1991	Unplugged (The Official Bootleg)	Gene Vincent	
"Blue Moon of Kentucky"	1991	Unplugged (The Official Bootleg)	Bill Monroe	
"San Francisco Bay Blues"	1991	Unplugged (The Official Bootleg)	Jesse Fuller	
"Hi-Heel Sneakers"	1991	Unplugged (The Official Bootleg)	Tommy Tucker	
"Good Rockin' Tonight"	1991	Unplugged (The Official Bootleg)	Roy Brown	
"Singing The Blues"	1991	Unplugged (The Official Bootleg)	Marty Robbins	
"A Room With A View"	1998	Twentieth-Century Blues: The Songs of Noël Coward	Jessie Matthews, Sonnie Hale, and Adrienne Brune	
"Blue Jean Bop"	1999	Run Devil Run	Gene Vincent	
"She Said Yeah"	1999	Run Devil Run	Larry Williams	
"All Shook Up"	1999	Run Devil Run	David Hill	
"No Other Baby"	1999	Run Devil Run	Dickie Bishop and The Sidekicks	
"Lonesome Town"	1999	Run Devil Run	Ricky Nelson	
"Movie Magg"	1999	Run Devil Run	Carl Perkins	
"Brown Eyed Handsome Man"	1999	Run Devil Run	Chuck Berry	
"Coquette"	1999	Run Devil Run	Guy Lombardo	
"I Got Stung"	1999	Run Devil Run	Elvis Presley	
"Honey Hush"	1999	Run Devil Run	Big Joe Turner	
"Shake a Hand"	1999	Run Devil Run	Faye Adams	
"Party"	1999	Run Devil Run	Elvis Presley	
"Fabulous"	1999	Run Devil Run	Charlie Gracie	
"Maybe Baby"	2000	Maybe Baby (Original Soundtrack)	The Crickets	
"I'm Partial to Your Abracadabra"	2001	Brand New Boots and Panties	The Blockheads	
"All Things Must Pass"	2003	Concert for George	George Harrison	
"I Want to Walk You Home"	2007	Goin' Home: A Tribute to Fats Domino	Fats Domino	
"It's So Easy"	2011	Rave On Buddy Holly	The Crickets	
"I'm Gonna Sit Right Down and Write Myself a Letter"	2012	Kisses on the Bottom	Fats Waller	
"Home (When Shadows Fall)"	2012	Kisses on the Bottom	Harold Van Emburgh	
"It's Only a Paper Moon"	2012	Kisses on the Bottom	Claire Carleton	
"More I Cannot Wish You"	2012	Kisses on the Bottom	Pat Rooney, Sr.	
"The Glory of Love"	2012	Kisses on the Bottom	Willie Bryant	
"We Three (My Echo, My Shadow and Me)"	2012	Kisses on the Bottom	The Ink Spots	
"Ac-Cent-Tchu-Ate the Positive"	2012	Kisses on the Bottom	Johnny Mercer	
"Always"	2012	Kisses on the Bottom	Irving Kaufman	
"My Very Good Friend the Milkman"	2012	Kisses on the Bottom	Fats Waller	
"Bye Bye Blackbird"	2012	Kisses on the Bottom	Sam Lanin	
"Get Yourself Another Fool"	2012	Kisses on the Bottom	Charles Brown	
"The Inch Worm"	2012	Kisses on the Bottom	Danny Kaye	
"My One and Only Love"	2012	Kisses on the Bottom	Frank Sinatra	
"The Christmas Song (Chestnuts Roasting on an Open Fire)"	2012	Kisses on the Bottom	Nat King Cole	
"Baby Face"	2014	Venus and Mars (Deluxe Edition)	Jan Garber	
"Tragedy"	2018	Red Rose Speedway (Deluxe Edition)	Thomas Wayne	

=== George Harrison ===
Song	Year	Album	Original artist	Ref.
"If Not For You"	1970	All Things Must Pass	Bob Dylan	
"Bye Bye Love"	1974	Dark Horse	The Everly Brothers	
"True Love"	1976	Thirty Three & 1/3	Bing Crosby, Grace Kelly	
"Baltimore Oriole"	1981	Somewhere in England	Hoagy Carmichael	
"Hong Kong Blues"	1981	Somewhere in England	Hoagy Carmichael	
"I Really Love You"	1982	Gone Troppo	The Stereos	
"Got My Mind Set on You"	1987	Cloud Nine	James Ray	
"Nobody's Child"	1990	Nobody's Child: Romanian Angel Appeal	Hank Snow	
"Runaway"	1990	She's My Baby (single)	Del Shannon	
"Roll Over Beethoven"	1992	Live in Japan	Chuck Berry	
"Absolutely Sweet Marie"	1993	The 30th Anniversary Concert Celebration	Bob Dylan	
"Between the Devil and the Deep Blue Sea"	2002	Brainwashed	Cab Calloway	
"Everybody's Trying to Be My Baby"	2006	Blue Suede Shoes: A Rockabilly Session	Carl Perkins	
"Mama, You've Been on My Mind"	2012	Early Takes: Volume 1	Bob Dylan	
"Let It Be Me"	2012	Early Takes: Volume 1	The Everly Brothers	
"Wedding Bells (Are Breaking Up That Old Gang of Mine)"	2021	All Things Must Pass (50th Anniversary)	Gene Austin	

=== Ringo Starr ===
Song	Year	Album	Original artist	Ref.
"Sentimental Journey"	1970	Sentimental Journey	Les Brown	
"Night and Day"	1970	Sentimental Journey	Fred Astaire	
"Whispering Grass (Don't Tell the Trees)"	1970	Sentimental Journey	Erskine Hawkins	
"Bye Bye Blackbird"	1970	Sentimental Journey	Sam Lanin	
"I'm a Fool to Care"	1970	Sentimental Journey	Ted Daffan	
"Stardust"	1970	Sentimental Journey	Hoagy Carmichael	
"Blue, Turning Grey Over You"	1970	Sentimental Journey	Louis Armstrong	
"Love Is a Many Splendoured Thing"	1970	Sentimental Journey	The Four Aces	
"Dream"	1970	Sentimental Journey	The Pied Pipers	
"You Always Hurt the One You Love"	1970	Sentimental Journey	The Mills Brothers	
"Have I Told You Lately That I Love You?"	1970	Sentimental Journey	Gene Autry	
"Let the Rest of the World Go By"	1970	Sentimental Journey	Morton Downey	
"Loser's Lounge"	1970	Beaucoups of Blues	Cal Smith	
"Have You Seen My Baby"	1973	Ringo	Randy Newman	
"You're Sixteen"	1973	Ringo	Johnny Burnette	
"Husbands and Wives"	1974	Goodnight Vienna	Roger Miller	
"Occapella"	1974	Goodnight Vienna	Lee Dorsey	
"Only You"	1974	Goodnight Vienna	The Platters	
"Hey! Baby"	1976	Ringo's Rotogravure	Bruce Channel	
"Drowning in the Sea of Love"	1977	Ringo the 4th	Joe Simon	
"Can She Do It Like She Dances"	1977	Ringo the 4th	King Floyd	
"Sneaking Sally Through the Alley"	1977	Ringo the 4th	Lee Dorsey	
"Bad Boy"	1978	Bad Boy	Lil Armstrong	
"Lipstick Traces (On a Cigarette)"	1978	Bad Boy	Benny Spellman	
"Heart on My Sleeve"	1978	Bad Boy	Gallagher and Lyle	
"Where Did Our Love Go"	1978	Bad Boy	The Supremes	
"Hard Times"	1978	Bad Boy	Peter Skellern	
"Tonight"	1978	Bad Boy	Small Faces	
"Monkey See – Monkey Do"	1978	Bad Boy	Michael Franks	
"You Belong to Me"	1981	Stop and Smell the Roses	Joni James	
"Sure to Fall"	1981	Stop and Smell the Roses	Carl Perkins	
"She's About a Mover"	1983	Old Wave	Sir Douglas Quintet	
"I Keep Forgettin'"	1983	Old Wave	Chuck Jackson	
"When You Wish Upon a Star"	1988	Stay Awake: Various Interpretations of Music from Vintage Disney Films	Cliff Edwards	
"Honey Don't"	1989	Ringo Starr and His All-Starr Band	Carl Perkins	
"Act Naturally"	1989	Ringo Starr and His All-Starr Band	Buck Owens	
"Golden Blunders"	1992	Time Takes Time	The Posies	
"Don't Be Cruel"	1992	Time Takes Time	Elvis Presley	
"Boys"	1993	Ringo Starr and His All Starr Band Volume 2: Live from Montreux	The Shirelles	
"Brandy"	1994	Stop and Smell the Roses Reissue	The O'Jays	
"Lay Down Your Arms"	1995	For the Love of Harry: Everybody Sings Nilsson	Harry Nilsson	
"Drift Away"	1998	Vertical Man	Mike Berry	
"Winter Wonderland"	1999	I Wanna Be Santa Claus	Richard Himber	
"The Little Drummer Boy"	1999	I Wanna Be Santa Claus	Trapp Family	
"Rudolph the Red-Nosed Reindeer"	1999	I Wanna Be Santa Claus	Gene Autry	
"Blue Christmas"	1999	I Wanna Be Santa Claus	Doye O'Dell	
"White Christmas"	1999	I Wanna Be Santa Claus	Bing Crosby	
"Think It Over"	2012	Ringo 2012	The Crickets	
"Rock Island Line"	2012	Ringo 2012	Lead Belly	
"Hey, Would You Hold it Down?"	2018	King of the Road - A Tribute to Roger Miller	Roger Miller	
"Grow Old with Me"	2019	What's My Name	John Lennon	
"Money (That's What I Want)"	2019	What's My Name	Barrett Strong	
"Rock Around the Clock"	2021	Change the World	Sonny Dae and His Knights	
"See You Later, Alligator"	2021	Songs from Quarantine: Vol. 2	Bobby Charles	

== See also ==
- Outline of the Beatles
- The Beatles timeline
