= Pop Go the Beatles =

British radio show that ran in 1963

- Vinyl album cover of the show
- Running time: 29 minutes (5:00 pm – 5:29 pm)
- Home station: BBC Light Programme
- Hosted by: Lee Peters; Rodney Burke
- Starring: The Beatles
- Created by: Vernon Lawrence
- Produced by: Terry Henebery; Ian Grant
- Original release: 4 June – 24 September 1963
- No. of episodes: 15
- Opening theme: Pop Goes the Weasel

Pop Go the Beatles was a weekly radio show that ran for fifteen episodes on the BBC Light Programme from June to September 1963. Hosted by Lee Peters for the first four episodes and Rodney Burke for the following eleven, the show would feature a guest band and then a conversation with and performance by the Beatles.

== Background ==
The show was first pitched by studio manager Vernon Lawrence to his assistant Donald MacLean on 30 April 1963. At first only four episodes were booked, but eleven more were later added due to the show's success. The first four episodes of the show were hosted by disc jockey Lee Peters, whom the Beatles secretly referred to as "Pee Litres" behind his back, and the following eleven were hosted by Rodney Burke. It was produced by Terry Henebery for the first thirteen episodes and Ian Grant for the final two, with a budget of £100 per episode. The BBC estimated at the time that the show was heard by 5.3% of the British population, or 2.8 million people, though it only received 52 out of 100 on the Appreciation Index.

== Content ==
Each episode of the show would begin with a guest act and then feature a conversation with and performance by the Beatles, usually comprising six songs. Guest acts on the show included the Hollies, the Searchers, Carter-Lewis and the Southerners, and Russ Sainty. Throughout the run of the show, the Beatles played many covers that they never recorded in the studio, including Chuck Berry's "Too Much Monkey Business", "Sweet Little Sixteen", "Memphis, Tennessee", and "Carol"; Carl Perkins' "Sure to Fall", "Glad All Over", and "Lend Me Your Comb"; Arthur Alexander's "Soldier of Love" and "A Shot of Rhythm and Blues"; Ann-Margret's "I Just Don't Understand"; Ray Charles' "I Got a Woman"; Elvis Presley's "That's All Right"; the Jodimars' "Clarabella"; and Chan Romero's "Hippy Hippy Shake". The theme song for the show was a rock arrangement of the song "Pop Goes the Weasel" performed by the Beatles.

== Legacy ==
Many of the performances on the show were reissued on the compilation album Live at the BBC. Paul McCartney said about the recordings that "We are going for it, not holding back at all, trying to put in the best performance of our lifetimes.” Rolling Stone and Slate magazines both published retrospectives on the series, with the former saying the fifth episode was "...when the Beatles pulled even with their heroes, and then surpassed them" and the latter saying that the format of the show "compelled the band to dig deep into its repertoire" and show off their influences. Beatles historian Mark Lewisohn wrote that the band getting their own show at that point was "a remarkable coup", noting that the first episode was recorded less than a year after their first recording session for EMI.

== Episodes ==
Episode No.	Date recorded	Date aired	Host	Guest	Songs performed by the Beatles
1	24 May	4 June	Lee Peters	The Lorne Gibson Trio	"From Me to You" (John Lennon, Paul McCartney); "Everybody's Trying to Be My Baby" (Rex Griffin); "Do You Want to Know a Secret" (Lennon, McCartney); "You Really Got A Hold On Me" (Smokey Robinson); "Misery" (Lennon, McCartney); "The Hippy Hippy Shake" (Chan Romero)
2	1 June	11 June	Lee Peters	The Countrymen	"Too Much Monkey Business" (Chuck Berry); "I Got to Find My Baby" (Peter Joe Clayton); "Young Blood" (Doc Pomus, Jerry Leiber, Mike Stoller); "Baby It's You" (Mack David, Luther Dixon, Burt Bacharach); "Till There Was You" (Meredith Willson); "Love Me Do" (Lennon, McCartney)
3	1 June	18 June	Lee Peters	Carter-Lewis and the Southerners	"A Shot of Rhythm and Blues" (Terry Thompson); "Memphis, Tennessee" (Berry); "A Taste of Honey" (Bobby Scott and Ric Marlow); "Sure to Fall (in Love with You)" (Carl Perkins, Bill Cantrell, Quinton Claunch); "Money (That's What I Want)" (Berry Gordy, Janie Bradford); "From Me to You"
4	17 June	25 June	Lee Peters	The Bachelors	"I Saw Her Standing There" (Lennon, McCartney); "Anna (Go to Him)" (Arthur Alexander); "Boys" (Dixon, Wes Farrell); "Chains" (Gerry Goffin, Carole King); "P.S. I Love You" (Lennon, McCartney); "Twist and Shout" (Phil Medley, Bert Berns)
5	2 July	16 July	Rodney Burke	Duffy Power and the Graham Bond Quartet	"That's All Right (Mama)" (Arthur Crudup); "There's a Place" (Lennon, McCartney); "Carol" (Berry); "Soldier of Love (Lay Down Your Arms)" (Buzz Cason. Tony Moon); "Lend Me Your Comb" (Kay Twomey, Fred Wise, Ben Weisman); "Clarabella" (Frank Pingatore) (Note: The Beatles also recorded "Three Cool Cats" (Leiber and Stoller), "Sweet Little Sixteen", and "Ask Me Why" for the BBC on 2 July, but these were not broadcast at the time.)
6	10 July	23 July	Rodney Burke	Carter-Lewis and the Southerners	"Sweet Little Sixteen" (Berry); "A Taste of Honey"; "Nothin' Shakin' (But the Leaves on the Trees)" (Eddie Fontaine, Cirino Colacrai, Diane Lampert, John Gluck, Jr.); "Love Me Do"; "Lonesome Tears in My Eyes" (Johnny Burnette, Dorsey Burnette, Paul Burlison, Al Mortimer); "So How Come (No One Loves Me)" (Felice Bryant, Boudleaux Bryant)
7	10 July	30 July	Rodney Burke	The Searchers	"Memphis, Tennessee"; "Do You Want to Know a Secret"; "Till There Was You"; "Matchbox" (Perkins); "Please Mister Postman" (Georgia Dobbins, William Garrett, Freddie Gorman, Brian Holland, Robert Bateman); "The Hippy Hippy Shake"
8	16 July	6 August	Rodney Burke	The Swinging Blue Jeans	"I'm Gonna Sit Right Down and Cry (Over You)" (Joe Thomas, Howard Biggs); "Crying, Waiting, Hoping" (Buddy Holly); "Kansas City"/"Hey-Hey-Hey-Hey!" (Leiber, Stoller, Richard Penniman); "To Know Her Is to Love Her" (Phil Spector); "The Honeymoon Song" (Mikis Theodorakis, William Sansom); "Twist and Shout"
9	16 July	13 August	Rodney Burke	The Hollies	"Long Tall Sally" (Robert Blackwell, Enotris Johnson, Penniman); "Please Please Me" (Lennon, McCartney); "She Loves You" (Lennon, McCartney); "You Really Got a Hold On Me"; "I'll Get You" (Lennon, McCartney); "I Got a Woman" (Ray Charles)
10	16 July	20 August	Rodney Burke	Russ Sainty and the Nu-Notes	"She Loves You"; "Words of Love" (Holly); "Glad All Over" (Dave Clark, Mike Smith); "I Just Don't Understand" (Marijohn Wilkin, Kent Westberry); "Devil in Her Heart" (Richard B. Drapkin); "Slow Down" (Larry Williams)
11	1 August	27 August	Rodney Burke	The Cyril Davies Rhythm and Blues All Stars with Long John Baldry	"Ooh! My Soul" (Penniman); "Don't Ever Change" (Goffin, King); "Twist and Shout"; "She Loves You"; "Anna (Go to Him)"; "A Shot of Rhythm and Blues"
12	1 August	3 September	Rodney Burke	Brian Poole and the Tremeloes	"From Me to You"; "I'll Get You"; "Money (That's What I Want)"; "There's a Place"; "Honey Don't" (Perkins); "Roll Over Beethoven" (Berry) (Note: The Beatles also recorded "Lucille" and "Baby It's You" for the BBC on 1 August, but these were not broadcast at the time.)
13	3 September	10 September	Rodney Burke	Johnny Kidd & the Pirates	"Too Much Monkey Business"; "Till There Was You"; "Love Me Do"; "She Loves You"; "I'll Get You"; "The Hippy Hippy Shake"; "A Taste of Honey"
14	3 September	17 September	Rodney Burke	The Marauders	"Chains"; "You Really Got a Hold On Me"; "Misery"; "A Taste of Honey"; "Lucille" (Albert Collins, Penniman); "From Me To You"; "Boys"
15	3 September	24 September	Rodney Burke	Tony Rivers and the Castaways	"She Loves You"; "Ask Me Why" (Lennon, McCartney); "Devil in her Heart"; "I Saw Her Standing There"; "Sure to Fall (In Love With You)"; "Twist and Shout"

== Bibliography ==
- Lewisohn, Mark (1992). The Complete Beatles Chronicle. New York: Harmony Books. ISBN 978-0-517-58100-1.

== See also ==
- List of songs covered by the Beatles
