= The Beeb's Lost Beatles Tapes =

British music documentary radio series

- Genre: Rock music
- Running time: 30 minutes
- Country of origin: United Kingdom
- Language: English
- Home station: BBC Radio 1
- Hosted by: Richard Skinner
- Produced by: Kevin Howlett
- Original release: 1 October – 31 December 1988
- No. of episodes: 14

The Beeb's Lost Beatles Tapes is a music documentary series presented by Richard Skinner, comprising 14 half-hour episodes, broadcast on BBC Radio 1 between 1 October – 31 December 1988. Each episode was broadcast on Saturday evening with a repeat on the following Monday.

== Overview ==
The series presented rarely broadcast and unreleased BBC recordings of the Beatles made between 1963 and 1968. This included sessions from Saturday Club, Easy Beat and Pop Go the Beatles. As well as the songs, the programme included much of the Beatles' chat and interview material from the various programmes, much of it involving Brian Matthew and Kenny Everett. There are also contemporary interviews with people who were involved in the original programmes.

Howlett had previously co-produced a two hour programme for Radio 1 in 1982, The Beatles at the Beeb, which was the first airing of some of the same material, but focused on the early years and used only radio programme sources.

The programme title is something of a misnomer, since the tapes were not lost but simply shelved for many years.

Much of the session material featured on the programme, including some of the Beatles' chat, was finally given an official release on Live at the BBC in 1994 with additional recordings published in 2013 under the name On Air – Live at the BBC Volume 2.

The tapes were found in Park Mount Drive, Macclesfield in the late 1970s. John Beeling, a director for the BBC, accidentally met a collector called Mike Adams, who had recorded nearly every broadcast of the Beatles since 1962. Kevin Howlett, one of Britain's top producers, produced a new series using these tapes along with additional material. Howlett later wrote a book called Beatles at the Beeb which credits Adams and others. It was later edited and improved when the Beatles at the Beeb album was released.

In May 2012, Unicorn Records released an eight-CD box set of the entire fourteen-part series, presented in a high-gloss box containing eight CD mini jackets; although only available through the grey market, this marked the first release of its kind since its original broadcast in 1988.

== Episodes ==
Episode 1: A Tendency To Play Music - 1 October 1988

1. Pop Go The Beatles
2. From Us To You
3. Soldier Of Love (Pop Go The Beatles (5), 16 July 1963)
4. She Loves You (Easy Beat, 20 October 1963)
5. I Wanna Be Your Man (From Us To You (2), 30 March 1964)
6. I Got A Woman (Saturday Club, 4 April 1964)
7. Long Tall Sally (Saturday Club, 4 April 1964)
8. Tie Me Kangaroo Down (From Us To You (1), 26 December 1963)
9. "I Feel Fine" (Top Gear, 26 November 1964)
10. Peter Pilbeam Interview
11. Dream Baby (Teenager's Turn: Here We Go, 8 March 1962)
12. Peter Pilbeam Interview
13. Please Mr. Postman (Pop Go The Beatles (7), 30 July 1963)
14. Side by Side (Side By Side, 24 June 1963)
15. Too Much Monkey Business (Side By Side, 24 June 1963)
16. Thank You Girl (Side By Side, 13 May 1963)
17. "From Me to You" (Side By Side, 24 June 1963)
18. Ill be On My Way (Side By Side, 24 June 1963)
19. Pop Goes The Beatles

Episode 2: Bill Toppers - 8 October 1988

1. I Saw Her Standing There (Saturday Club, 25 May 1963)
2. Brian Matthew Interview
3. Long Tall Sally (Saturday Club, 25 May 1963)
4. Bernie Andrews Interview
5. Some Other Guy (Easy Beat, 23 June 1963)
6. A Taste Of Honey (Easy Beat, 23 June 1963)
7. Boys (Saturday Club, 25 May 1963)
8. Bernie Andrews Interview
9. Memphis (Saturday Club, 29 June 1963)
10. Happy Birthday (Saturday Club, 5 October 1963)
11. Ill Get You (Saturday Club, 5 October 1963)
12. She Loves You (Saturday Club, 5 October 1963)
13. Lucille (Saturday Club, 5 October 1963)

Episode 3: The Something-Something Show - 15 October 1988

1. Pop Goes The Beatles
2. I Got To Find My Baby (Pop Go The Beatles (2), 11 June 1963)
3. Terry Henebery Interview
4. Pop Goes The Beatles (Pop Go The Beatles (3), 18 June 1963)
5. A Shot Of Rhythm and Blues (Pop Go The Beatles (3), 18 June 1963)
6. Terry Henebery Interview
7. Money (Pop Go The Beatles (3), 18 June 1963)
8. Youngblood (Pop Go The Beatles (2), 11 June 1963)
9. Baby Its You (Pop Go The Beatles (2), 11 June 1963)
10. Happy Birthday (Pop Go The Beatles (2), 18 June 1963)
11. Sure To Fall (Pop Go The Beatles (3), 18 June 1963)
12. Anna (Pop Go The Beatles (4), 25 June 1963)
13. Twist and Shout (Pop Go The Beatles (4), 25 June 1963)
14. Lorne Gibson Interview
15. Pop Goes The Beatles

Episode 4: With These Haircuts? - 22 October 1988

1. Pop Goes The Beatles
2. Sweet Little Sixteen (Pop Go The Beatles (6), 23 July 1963)
3. Kieth Bateson Interview
4. That's Alright Mama (Pop Go The Beatles (5), 16 July 1963)
5. Carol (Pop Go The Beatles (5), 16 July 1963)
6. Soldier Of Love (Pop Go The Beatles (5), 16 July 1963)
7. Lend Me Your Comb (Pop Go The Beatles (5), 16 July 1963)
8. Clarabella (Pop Go The Beatles (5), 16 July 1963)
9. Terry Henebery Interview
10. Lonesome Tears (Pop Go The Beatles (6), 23 July 1963)
11. Nothin Shakin (Pop Go The Beatles (6), 23 July 1963)
12. So How Come (Pop Go The Beatles (6), 23 July 1963)
13. Pop Goes The Beatles

Episode 5: We’re Ready to Pop! - 29 October 1988

1. Pop Goes The Beatles
2. Im Gonna Sit Right Down (Pop Go The Beatles (8), 6 August 1963)
3. Hippy Hippy Shake (Pop Go The Beatles (7), 30 July 1963)
4. To Know Her Is To Love Her (Pop Go The Beatles (8), 6 August 1963)
5. John Andrews Interview
6. Matchbox (Pop Go The Beatles (7), 30 July 1963)
7. Please Mr Postman (Pop Go The Beatles (7),30 July 1963)
8. "Do You Want to Know a Secret" (Pop Go The Beatles (7),30 July 1963)
9. Crying Waiting Hoping (Pop Go The Beatles (8), 6 August 1963)
10. The Honeymoon Song (Pop Go The Beatles (8), 6 August 1963)
11. Please Please Me (Pop Go The Beatles (9), 13 August 1963)
12. I Got A Woman (Pop Go The Beatles (9), 13 August 1963)
13. Pop Goes The Beatles

Episode 6: Brackets! - 5 November 1988

1. Pop Goes The Beatles
2. Chains (Pop Go The Beatles (14), 17 September 1963)
3. Glad All Over (Pop Go The Beatles (10), 20 August 1963)
4. I Just Don't Understand (Pop Go The Beatles (10, 20 August 1963)
5. Don't Ever Change (Pop Go The Beatles (11), 27 August 1963)
6. Pop Chat Interview (Non Stop Pop, 30 August 1963)
7. Honey Don't (Pop Go The Beatles (12), 3 September 1963)
8. You Really Got A Hold On Me (Pop Go The Beatles (14), 17 September 1963)
9. Lucille (Pop Go The Beatles (14), 17 September 1963)
10. Twist and Shout (Pop Go The Beatles (15), 24 September 1963)
11. Pop Goes The Beatles

Episode 7: The Show Business Jackpot - 12 November 1988

1. I Saw Her Standing There (Easy Beat, 20 October 1963)
2. Love Me Do (Easy Beat, 20 October 1963)
3. Interview (November 1963)
4. She Loves You (Easy Beat, 20 October 1963)
5. Public Ear Interview (The Public Ear, 3 November 1963)
6. Saturday Club Interview (Saturday Club, 8 February 1964)
7. Johnny B Goode (Saturday Club, 15 February 1964)
8. I Want to Hold Your Hand (Saturday Club, 15 February 1964)
9. From Us To You

Episode 8: From Fluff to You - 19 November 1988

1. From Us To You
2. All My Loving (From Us To You (2), 30 March 1964)
3. Alan Freeman Interview
4. Till There Was You (From Us To You (2),30 March 1964)
5. Roll Over Beethoven (From Us To You (2),30 March 1964)
6. I Wanna Be Your Man (From Us To You (2),30 March 1964)
7. Cant Buy Me Love (From Us To You (2),30 March 1964)
8. From Us To You
9. Alan Freeman Interview
10. Happy Birthday (From Us To You (3), 18 May 1964)
11. Honey Don't (From Us To You (3), 18 May 1964)
12. I Forgot To Remember (From Us To You (3), 18 May 1964)
13. Alan Freeman Interview
14. You Cant Do That (From Us To You (3), 18 May 1964)
15. Alan Freeman Interview
16. From Us To You

Episode 9: Fab Gear, Top Gear - 26 November 1988

1. Top Gear Promo (Top Gear, 16 July 1964)
2. I Got A Woman (Saturday Club, 4 April 1964)
3. Sure To Fall (Saturday Club, 4 April 1964)
4. Top Gear Promo (Top Gear, 16 July 1964)
5. Long Tall Sally (Top Gear, 16 July 1964)
6. Things We Said Today (Top Gear, 16 July 1964)
7. Brian Matthew Interview
8. A Hard Days Night (Top Gear, 16 July 1964)
9. And I Love Her (Top Gear, 16 July 1964)
10. I Feel Fine (Top Gear, 17 November 1964)

Episode 10: Automatic Pier - 3 December 1988

1. Barbara Garnet Interview
2. Im A Loser (Top Gear, 26 November 1964)
3. Public Ear Interview (The Public Ear, 22 March 1964)
4. Tony Hall Interview
5. Public Ear Interview (The Public Ear, 22 March 1964)
6. Public Ear Interview (The Public Ear, 24 March 1964)
7. Honey Don't (Top Gear, 26 November 1964)
8. The World Of Books Interview (The World Of Books, 3 July 1965)
9. Ill Follow The Sun (Top Gear, 26 November 1964)
10. Pop Profile Interview (Pop Profile, November 1965)
11. Shes A Woman (Top Gear, 26 November 1964)

Episode 11: Green with Black Shutters - 10 December 1988

1. Rock And Roll Music (Saturday Club, 26 December 1964)
2. Everybody's Trying to Be My Baby (Saturday Club, 26 December 1964)
3. Kansas City (Saturday Club, 26 December 1964)
4. Ticket to Ride (The Beatles Invite You To Take A Ticket To Ride, 7 June 1965)
5. Keith Bateson Interview
6. MBE Interview (June 1965)
7. Dizzy Miss Lizzie (The Beatles Invite You To Take A Ticket To Rid, 7 June 1965)
8. Pop Profile Interview (Pop Profile, May 1966)

Episode 12: They Could Almost Hear Us - 17 December 1988

1. The Beatles Abroad Interview (The Beatles Abroad, 30 August 1965)
2. Help (30 August 1965- Hollywood Bowl)
3. The Beatles Abroad Interview (The Beatles Abroad, 30 August 1965)
4. Pop Profile Interview (Pop Profile, May 1966)
5. A Hard Days Night (Peggy Lee-Excerpt)
6. All My Loving (Matt Monro-Excerpt) (The Lennon-McCartney Songbook, 29 August 1966)
7. And I Love Her (Lena Horne-Excerpt) (The Lennon-McCartney Songbook, 29 August 1966)
8. Wait (Frankie Vaughn-Excerpt) (The Lennon-McCartney Songbook, 29 August 1966)

Episode 13: A Chrimble Mudley - 24 December 1988

1. This Boy (Saturday Club, 21 December 1963)
2. All I Want For Christmas (Saturday Club, 21 December 1963)
3. Roll Over Beethoven (Saturday Club, 21 December 1963)
4. From Us To You (From Us To You (1), 26 December 1963)
5. She Loves You (From Us To You (1), 26 December 1963)
6. Tie Me Kangaroo Down (From Us To You (1), 26 December 1963)
7. I Want To Hold Your Hand (From Us To You (1), 26 December 1963)
8. From Us To You (From Us To You, 26 December 1963)
9. We Can Work It Out (cv)
10. Drive My Car (cv)
11. Saturday Club Interview (Saturday Club, 25 December 1965)

Episode 14: No More She Loves Yous - 31 December 1988

1. The Kenny Everett Show Interview (The Kenny Everett Show, 9 June 1968)
2. Top Of The Pops Interview (Top Of The Pops, 20 March 1967)
3. Scene And Heard Interview (Scene And Heard, 30 September/7 October 1967)
4. Flying (cv)
5. Where Its At Interview (Where It's At, 24 November 1967)
6. Pop Profile Interview (Pop Profile, 30 November 1965)
7. If I Needed Someone (cv)
8. The Kenny Everett Show Interview (The Kenny Everett Show, 9 June 1968)
9. George Harrison Interview
10. Crying Waiting Hoping (Pop Go The Beatles (8), 6 August 1963)
11. George Harrison Interview
12. Pop Goes The Beatles

All episodes were presented by Richard Skinner and produced by Kevin Howlett.
