= Live at the BBC (Beatles album) =

Live album and compilation album by the Beatles
- Released: 30 November 1994
- Recorded: 22 January 1963 – 26 May 1965, United Kingdom
- Genres: Rhythm and blues, rock and roll
- Length: 133:37
- Label: Apple
- Producer: George Martin
- Compiler: George Martin

The Beatles chronology
The Beatles Box Set (1988)	Live at the BBC (1994)	Anthology 1 (1995)

Singles from Live at the BBC
- 1. "Baby It's You" Released: 20 March 1995

Live at the BBC is a 1994 live and compilation album featuring performances by the Beatles that were originally broadcast on various BBC Light Programme radio shows from 1963 to 1965. The mono album, available in multiple formats but most commonly as a two-CD set, consists of 56 songs and 13 tracks of dialogue; 30 of the songs had never been issued previously by the Beatles. It was the first official release by the Beatles of previously unreleased performances since The Beatles at the Hollywood Bowl in 1977 and the first containing previously unreleased songs since their final studio album, Let It Be, in 1970.

Although the songs were recorded ahead of broadcast, allowing for retakes and occasional overdubbing, they are essentially "live in studio" performances. Most of the songs are cover versions of material from the late 1950s and early 1960s, reflecting the stage set they developed before Beatlemania. Before the album's release, comprehensive collections of the Beatles' BBC performances had become available on bootlegs.

A remastered repackaging of the album was released on 11 November 2013 on the occasion of the release of On Air – Live at the BBC Volume 2, a second volume of BBC Radio broadcasts. The two volumes were also released as a double set.

== History ==
=== Recording ===
The Beatles performed for 52 BBC Radio programmes, beginning with an appearance on the series Teenager's Turn—Here We Go, recorded on 7 March 1962, and ending with the special The Beatles Invite You to Take a Ticket to Ride, recorded on 26 May 1965. 47 of their BBC appearances occurred in 1963 and 1964, including 10 on Saturday Club and 15 on their own weekly series Pop Go the Beatles, which began in June 1963. As the Beatles had not accumulated many original songs by this time, the majority of their BBC performances consisted of cover versions, drawing on the repertoire that they had developed for their early stage act. In total, 275 performances of 88 different songs were broadcast, of which 36 songs never appeared on their studio albums.

Several of the programmes aired live, but most were recorded days (or occasionally weeks) ahead of the broadcast date. The BBC's studio facilities were not as advanced as those at Abbey Road, offering only monaural recording (no multitracking) and basic overdubbing; few retakes of songs could be attempted owing to time limitations. It was not the BBC's practice to archive either the session tapes or the shows' master tapes, owing to storage space and contractual restrictions.

=== Earlier collections and presentations ===
The first collection of Beatles BBC performances was the bootleg album Yellow Matter Custard, issued in 1971, consisting of 14 songs that were probably off-air home recordings made during the original radio broadcasts. Some additional performances with similar "tinny" sound appeared on other bootlegs in the following years; then in 1980, the bootleg The Beatles Broadcasts was released featuring 18 BBC songs with superior sound quality.

To commemorate the 20th anniversary of their first BBC appearance, the BBC (nicknamed "the Beeb") aired the two-hour radio special "The Beatles at the Beeb" in 1982, featuring a mix of BBC performances and interviews (the show was expanded to three hours when syndicated to other countries). The more comprehensive series The Beeb's Lost Beatles Tapes was broadcast by BBC Radio 1 in 1988 as 14 half-hour episodes. When gathering material for that series, only a small number of original tapes were found; many more performances were obtained from vinyl recordings of the programmes that the BBC Transcription Department had made to distribute to BBC stations around the world.

By that time, a 13-album bootleg series had appeared under the title The Beatles at the Beeb, featuring many previously unavailable performances. This was surpassed in 1993 by The Complete BBC Sessions, a nine-CD box set released by Great Dane in Italy, where copyright protection for the broadcasts had expired; the set contained performances from 44 of the Beatles' 52 BBC appearances, including many complete shows.

=== Compilation and release ===
An official Beatles BBC album was being planned as early as 1982, and it was reported that "EMI was preparing an album" of the BBC material by late 1991. To supplement the archive he had partially rebuilt for The Beeb's Lost Beatles Tapes, BBC Radio producer Kevin Howlett sought out additional sources, such as tapes kept by people involved in the original sessions; others had contacted him after the series aired to inform him of their own home recordings of additional broadcasts. Remaining gaps were filled by recordings taken from available bootlegs.

From the available recordings, the tracks for Live at the BBC were selected by longtime Beatles producer George Martin. Martin's selection criteria included both the quality of the sound and of the Beatles' performance. Of particular interest were the 36 songs that the Beatles never performed on their official releases, of which 30 were selected for the album. Three of the six omitted were from 1962 (none of the 1962 recordings were judged to be of commercial sound quality): Roy Orbison's "Dream Baby (How Long Must I Dream)", the Coasters' arrangement of "Bésame Mucho" and Joe Brown's "A Picture of You", all with Pete Best on drums. Two others, from early 1963, also were omitted for substandard sound: the Gerry Goffin–Jack Keller adaptation of Stephen Foster's "Beautiful Dreamer" and Chuck Berry's "I'm Talking About You". The reason for the omission of the final song of the six, Carl Perkins' "Lend Me Your Comb" from July 1963, was not clear as it had very good sound quality, and it was speculated that it was held back for inclusion on a later release; the song was indeed issued the following year on Anthology 1. It was also later included on 2013's On Air – Live at the BBC Volume 2, as are "Beautiful Dreamer" and "I'm Talking About You".

The selected songs included "I'll Be on My Way", the only Lennon–McCartney composition that the Beatles recorded for the BBC with no available studio version. The Buddy Holly-style ballad was their first composition to be "given away" without the Beatles attempting to record it for their own release. The song was given to Billy J. Kramer, another artist managed by Brian Epstein recording for Parlophone, who released it in the United Kingdom as the B-side of a cover version of "Do You Want to Know a Secret".

In all, 56 songs were chosen for the album, along with some banter among the group and the hosts. Abbey Road engineer Peter Mew used audio manipulation software to reduce noise, repair minor drop-outs and equalise to a more consistent sound from one track to the next. The resulting sound quality was considered generally better than the best equivalent bootlegged versions available at the time, although a small number of tracks were noted as exceptions.

Live at the BBC was released on 30 November 1994 in the UK (Apple/Parlophone PCSP 726), and on 6 December 1994 in the United States (Apple/Capitol CDP 7243-8-31796-2-6). The track listing on the back of the CD case inadvertently included the word "Top" at the start of the song title "So How Come (No One Loves Me)"; the listing was corrected for the 2001 reissue. When "Baby It's You" was released as a single in March 1995, it contained three other BBC songs that were not included in the album, two of which would eventually be found on volume two.

==== 2013 remaster ====
The 11 November 2013 remastered reissue features a number of minor changes. The reissue includes two additional speech tracks, "What is it, George?" (track 17 on disc 1), and "Ringo? Yep!" (track 3 on disc 2), and one additional song, the closing version of "From Us To You" at the end of disc 2. The opening version of “From Us To You” has announcer speech over the music, which was not present in the original version. The reissue removes the crossfades between tracks, providing clean starts and endings for each track except one, the crowd noise between Some Other Guy and Thank You Girl. The speech track "Have a Banana!" from the original version was not separable from "A Hard Day's Night", so the song and speech were merged into a single track, though the last few seconds where Ringo is actually offered a banana was cut out.

== Reception ==
Professional ratings
Review scores
Source	Rating
AllMusic	4.5/5 stars
Robert Christgau	B+
The Encyclopedia of Popular Music	4/5 stars
Rolling Stone	4/5 stars

Live at the BBC debuted at number 1 on the Canadian charts, peaked at number 3 on the US Billboard 200 album chart and reached number 1 on the UK Albums Chart. The album sold an estimated 8 million copies worldwide during its first year of release.

A reviewer for Time said that the collection contained "few buried treasures", but "as a time capsule, the set is invaluable". Another reviewer described it as "worth hearing" even though the album is a "quaint memento" in which The Beatles sound "scruffy and fairly tame". Anthony DeCurtis, writing for Rolling Stone, was more enthusiastic, calling the album "an exhilarating portrait of a band in the process of shaping its own voice and vision" while noting the "irresistible" spirit and energy of the performances.

The album received a nomination for Best Historical Album at the 38th Annual Grammy Awards in 1996.

== Track listing ==
Speech tracks are in italics.

=== 1994 version ===
All tracks are written by Lennon–McCartney, except where noted (and excluding all spoken word tracks).

Side one
No.	Title	Writer(s)	Lead vocals	Length
1.	"Beatle Greetings" (The Public Ear, 3 November 1963)			0:14
2.	"From Us to You" (From Us to You, 30 March 1964)		John Lennon and Paul McCartney	0:27
3.	"Riding on a Bus" (Top Gear, 26 November 1964)			0:54
4.	"I Got a Woman" (Pop Go the Beatles, 13 August 1963)	Ray Charles, Renald Richard	Lennon	2:48
5.	"Too Much Monkey Business" (Pop Go the Beatles, 10 September 1963)	Chuck Berry	Lennon	2:06
6.	"Keep Your Hands off My Baby" (Saturday Club, 26 January 1963)	Gerry Goffin, Carole King	Lennon	2:30
7.	"I'll Be on My Way" (Side by Side, 24 June 1963)		Lennon, with McCartney	1:58
8.	"Young Blood" (Pop Go the Beatles, 11 June 1963)	Jerry Leiber, Mike Stoller, Doc Pomus	George Harrison	1:57
9.	"A Shot of Rhythm and Blues" (Pop Go the Beatles, 27 August 1963)	Terry Thompson	Lennon	2:15
10.	"Sure to Fall (in Love with You)" (Pop Go the Beatles, 18 June 1963)	Carl Perkins, Quinton Claunch, Bill Cantrell	McCartney, with Lennon	2:08
11.	"Some Other Guy" (Easy Beat, 23 June 1963)	Leiber, Stoller, Richard Barrett	Lennon, with McCartney	2:01
12.	"Thank You Girl" (Easy Beat, 23 June 1963)		Lennon, with McCartney	2:01
13.	"Sha La La La La!" (Pop Go the Beatles, 11 June 1963)			0:28
14.	"Baby It's You" (Pop Go the Beatles, 11 June 1963)	Mack David, Burt Bacharach, "Barney Williams"	Lennon	2:44
15.	"That's All Right (Mama)" (Pop Go the Beatles, 16 July 1963)	Arthur Crudup	McCartney	2:54
16.	"Carol" (Pop Go the Beatles, 16 July 1963)	Berry	Lennon	2:35
17.	"Soldier of Love" (Pop Go the Beatles, 16 July 1963)	Buzz Cason, Tony Moon	Lennon	2:00

Side two
No.	Title	Writer(s)	Lead vocals	Length
18.	"A Little Rhyme" (Pop Go the Beatles, 16 July 1963)			0:26
19.	"Clarabella" (Pop Go the Beatles, 16 July 1963)	Frank Pingatore	McCartney	2:39
20.	"I'm Gonna Sit Right Down and Cry (Over You)" (Pop Go the Beatles, 6 August 1963)	Joe Thomas, Howard Biggs	Lennon, with McCartney	2:01
21.	"Crying, Waiting, Hoping" (Pop Go the Beatles, 6 August 1963)	Buddy Holly	Harrison	2:09
22.	"Dear Wack!" (Saturday Club, 24 August 1963)			0:42
23.	"You Really Got a Hold on Me" (Saturday Club, 24 August 1963)	Smokey Robinson	Lennon and Harrison	2:37
24.	"To Know Her Is to Love Her" (Pop Go the Beatles, 6 August 1963)	Phil Spector	Lennon	2:49
25.	"A Taste of Honey" (Pop Go the Beatles, 23 July 1963)	Bobby Scott, Ric Marlow	McCartney	1:57
26.	"Long Tall Sally" (Pop Go the Beatles, 13 August 1963)	Enotris Johnson, Robert Blackwell, Richard Penniman	McCartney	1:53
27.	"I Saw Her Standing There" (Easy Beat, 20 October 1963)		McCartney	2:32
28.	"The Honeymoon Song" (Pop Go the Beatles, 6 August 1963)	Mikis Theodorakis, William Sansom	McCartney	1:39
29.	"Johnny B. Goode" (Saturday Club, 15 February 1964)	Berry	Lennon	2:51
30.	"Memphis, Tennessee" (Pop Go the Beatles, 30 July 1963)	Berry	Lennon	2:13
31.	"Lucille" (Saturday Club, 5 October 1963)	Albert Collins, Penniman	McCartney	1:49
32.	"Can't Buy Me Love" (From Us to You, 30 March 1964)		McCartney	2:06
33.	"From Fluff to You" (From Us to You, 30 March 1964)			0:28
34.	"Till There Was You" (From Us to You, 30 March 1964)	Meredith Willson	McCartney	2:13
Total length:				1:05:04

Side three
No.	Title	Writer(s)	Lead vocals	Length
1.	"Crinsk Dee Night" (Top Gear, 16 July 1964)			1:05
2.	"A Hard Day's Night" (Top Gear, 16 July 1964)		Lennon, with McCartney	2:24
3.	"Have a Banana!" (Top Gear, 16 July 1964)			0:22
4.	"I Wanna Be Your Man" (From Us to You, 30 March 1964)		Ringo Starr	2:09
5.	"Just a Rumour" (From Us to You, 30 March 1964)			0:20
6.	"Roll Over Beethoven" (From Us to You, 30 March 1964)	Berry	Harrison	2:16
7.	"All My Loving" (From Us to You, 30 March 1964)		McCartney	2:04
8.	"Things We Said Today" (Top Gear, 16 July 1964)		McCartney	2:18
9.	"She's a Woman" (Top Gear, 26 November 1964)		McCartney	3:15
10.	"Sweet Little Sixteen" (Pop Go the Beatles, 23 July 1963)	Berry	Lennon	2:21
11.	"1822!" (Pop Go the Beatles, 23 July 1963)			0:10
12.	"Lonesome Tears in My Eyes" (Pop Go the Beatles, 23 July 1963)	Johnny Burnette, Dorsey Burnette, Paul Burlison, Al Mortimer	Lennon	2:36
13.	"Nothin' Shakin'" (Pop Go the Beatles, 23 July 1963)	Eddie Fontaine, Cirino Colacrai, Diane Lampert, John Gluck Jr.	Harrison	2:59
14.	"The Hippy Hippy Shake" (Pop Go the Beatles, 30 July 1963)	Chan Romero	McCartney	1:49
15.	"Glad All Over" (Pop Go the Beatles, 20 August 1963)	Aaron Schroeder, Sid Tepper, Roy Bennett	Harrison	1:52
16.	"I Just Don't Understand" (Pop Go the Beatles, 20 August 1963)	Marijohn Wilkin, Kent Westberry	Lennon	2:47
17.	"So How Come (No One Loves Me)" (Pop Go the Beatles, 23 July 1963)	Felice and Boudleaux Bryant	Harrison, with Lennon and McCartney	1:54
18.	"I Feel Fine" (Top Gear, 26 November 1964)		Lennon	2:13

Side four
No.	Title	Writer(s)	Lead vocals	Length
19.	"I'm a Loser" (Top Gear, 26 November 1964)		Lennon	2:33
20.	"Everybody's Trying to Be My Baby" (Saturday Club, 26 December 1964)	Perkins	Harrison	2:21
21.	"Rock and Roll Music" (Saturday Club, 26 December 1964)	Berry	Lennon	2:01
22.	"Ticket to Ride" (The Beatles Invite You to Take a Ticket to Ride, 7 June 1965)		Lennon	2:56
23.	"Dizzy Miss Lizzy" (The Beatles Invite You to Take a Ticket to Ride, 7 June 1965)	Larry Williams	Lennon	2:42
24.	"Kansas City / Hey-Hey-Hey-Hey!" (Pop Go the Beatles, 6 August 1963)	Leiber, Stoller / Penniman	McCartney	2:37
25.	"Set Fire to That Lot!" (Pop Go the Beatles, 30 July 1963)			0:28
26.	"Matchbox" (Pop Go the Beatles, 30 July 1963)	Perkins	Starr	1:57
27.	"I Forgot to Remember to Forget" (From Us to You, 28 May 1964)	Stan Kesler, Charlie Feathers	Harrison	2:09
28.	"Love These Goon Shows!" (Pop Go the Beatles, 11 June 1963)			0:27
29.	"I Got to Find My Baby" (Pop Go the Beatles, 11 June 1963)	Clayton	Lennon	1:56
30.	"Ooh! My Soul" (Pop Go the Beatles, 27 August 1963)	Penniman	McCartney	1:37
31.	"Ooh! My Arms" (Pop Go the Beatles, 27 August 1963)			0:36
32.	"Don't Ever Change" (Pop Go the Beatles, 27 August 1963)	Goffin, King	Harrison and McCartney	2:03
33.	"Slow Down" (Pop Go the Beatles, 20 August 1963)	Larry Williams	Lennon	2:36
34.	"Honey Don't" (Pop Go the Beatles, 3 September 1963)	Perkins	Lennon	2:11
35.	"Love Me Do" (Pop Go the Beatles, 23 July 1963)		McCartney, with Lennon	2:30
Total length:				1:08:34

=== 2013 version ===
All tracks are written by Lennon–McCartney, except where noted (and excluding all spoken word tracks).

Side one
No.	Title	Writer(s)	Lead vocals	Length
1.	"Beatle Greetings" (The Public Ear, 3 November 1963)			0:14
2.	"From Us to You (Opening)" (From Us to You, 30 March 1964)		Lennon and McCartney	0:30
3.	"Riding on a Bus" (Top Gear, 26 November 1964)			0:55
4.	"I Got a Woman" (Pop Go the Beatles, 13 August 1963)	Charles, Richard	Lennon	2:48
5.	"Too Much Monkey Business" (Pop Go the Beatles, 10 September 1963)	Berry	Lennon	2:08
6.	"Keep Your Hands off My Baby" (Saturday Club, 26 January 1963)	Goffin, King	Lennon	2:31
7.	"I'll Be on My Way" (Side by Side, 24 June 1963)		Lennon, with McCartney	1:58
8.	"Young Blood" (Pop Go the Beatles, 11 June 1963)	Leiber, Stoller, Pomus	Harrison	1:56
9.	"A Shot of Rhythm and Blues" (Pop Go the Beatles, 27 August 1963)	Thompson	Lennon	2:16
10.	"Sure to Fall (In Love with You)" (Pop Go the Beatles, 18 June 1963)	Perkins, Claunch, Cantrell	McCartney	2:08
11.	"Some Other Guy" (Easy Beat, 23 June 1963)	Leiber, Stoller, Barrett	Lennon, with McCartney	2:01
12.	"Thank You Girl" (Easy Beat, 23 June 1963)		Lennon, with McCartney	2:01

Side two
No.	Title	Writer(s)	Lead vocals	Length
13.	"Sha La La La La!" (Pop Go the Beatles, 11 June 1963)			0:28
14.	"Baby It's You" (Pop Go the Beatles, 11 June 1963)	David, Bacharach, Williams	Lennon	2:44
15.	"That's All Right (Mama)" (Pop Go the Beatles, 16 July 1963)	Crudup	McCartney	2:56
16.	"Carol" (Pop Go the Beatles, 16 July 1963)	Berry	Lennon	2:36
17.	"What is it, George?" (Pop Go the Beatles, 16 July 1963)			0:31
18.	"Soldier of Love" (Pop Go the Beatles, 16 July 1963)	Cason, Moon	Lennon	1:59
19.	"A Little Rhyme" (Pop Go the Beatles, 16 July 1963)			0:26
20.	"Clarabella" (Pop Go the Beatles, 16 July 1963)	Pingatore	McCartney	2:40
21.	"I'm Gonna Sit Right Down and Cry (Over You)" (Pop Go the Beatles, 6 August 1963)	Thomas, Biggs	Lennon, with McCartney	2:02
22.	"Crying, Waiting, Hoping" (Pop Go the Beatles, 6 August 1963)	Holly	Harrison	2:11
23.	"Dear Wack!" (Saturday Club, 24 August 1963)			0:43
24.	"You Really Got a Hold on Me" (Saturday Club, 24 August 1963)	Robinson	Lennon and Harrison	2:38

Side three
No.	Title	Writer(s)	Lead vocals	Length
25.	"To Know Her Is to Love Her" (Pop Go the Beatles, 6 August 1963)	Spector	Lennon	2:51
26.	"A Taste of Honey" (Pop Go the Beatles, 23 July 1963)	Scott, Marlow	McCartney	1:59
27.	"Long Tall Sally" (Pop Go the Beatles, 13 August 1963)	Johnson, Blackwell, Penniman	McCartney	1:54
28.	"I Saw Her Standing There" (Easy Beat, 20 October 1963)		McCartney	2:35
29.	"The Honeymoon Song" (Pop Go the Beatles, 6 August 1963)	Theodorakis, Sansom	McCartney	1:40
30.	"Johnny B Goode" (Saturday Club, 15 February 1964)	Berry	Lennon	2:51
31.	"Memphis, Tennessee" (Pop Go the Beatles, 30 July 1963)	Berry	Lennon	2:16
32.	"Lucille" (Saturday Club, 5 October 1963)	Collins, Penniman	McCartney	1:50
33.	"Can't Buy Me Love" (From Us to You, 30 March 1964)		McCartney	2:08
34.	"From Fluff to You" (From Us to You, 30 March 1964)			0:28
35.	"Till There Was You" (From Us to You, 30 March 1964)	Willson	McCartney	2:17
Total length:				1:06:09

Side four
No.	Title	Writer(s)	Lead vocals	Length
1.	"Crinsk Dee Night" (Top Gear, 16 July 1964)			1:09
2.	"A Hard Day's Night" (Top Gear, 16 July 1964)		Lennon, with McCartney	2:24
3.	"Ringo? Yep!" (From Us to You, 30 March 1964)			0:14
4.	"I Wanna Be Your Man" (From Us to You, 30 March 1964)		Starr	2:10
5.	"Just a Rumour" (From Us to You, 30 March 1964)			0:20
6.	"Roll Over Beethoven" (From Us to You, 30 March 1964)	Berry	Harrison	2:17
7.	"All My Loving" (From Us to You, 30 March 1964)		McCartney	2:07
8.	"Things We Said Today" (Top Gear, 16 July 1964)		McCartney	2:18
9.	"She's a Woman" (Top Gear, 26 November 1964)		McCartney	3:19
10.	"Sweet Little Sixteen" (Pop Go the Beatles, 23 July 1963)	Berry	Lennon	2:21
11.	"1822!" (Pop Go the Beatles, 23 July 1963)			0:10
12.	"Lonesome Tears in My Eyes" (Pop Go the Beatles, 23 July 1963)	Burnette, Burnette, Burlison, Mortimer	Lennon	2:36

Side five
No.	Title	Writer(s)	Lead vocals	Length
13.	"Nothin' Shakin'" (Pop Go the Beatles, 23 July 1963)	Fontaine, Colacrai, Lampert, Gluck	Harrison	3:00
14.	"The Hippy Hippy Shake" (Pop Go the Beatles, 30 July 1963)	Romero	McCartney	1:50
15.	"Glad All Over" (Pop Go the Beatles, 20 August 1963)	Schroeder, Tepper, Bennett	Harrison	1:53
16.	"I Just Don't Understand" (Pop Go the Beatles, 20 August 1963)	Wilkin, Westberry	Lennon	2:48
17.	"So How Come (No One Loves Me)" (Pop Go the Beatles, 23 July 1963)	Bryant, Bryant	Harrison, with Lennon and McCartney	1:55
18.	"I Feel Fine" (Top Gear, 26 November 1964)		Lennon	2:16
19.	"I'm a Loser" (Top Gear, 26 November 1964)		Lennon	2:33
20.	"Everybody's Trying to Be My Baby" (Saturday Club, 26 December 1964)	Perkins	Harrison	2:23
21.	"Rock and Roll Music" (Saturday Club, 26 December 1964)	Berry	Lennon	2:02
22.	"Ticket to Ride" (The Beatles Invite You to Take a Ticket to Ride, 7 June 1965)		Lennon and McCartney	2:59

Side six
No.	Title	Writer(s)	Lead vocals	Length
23.	"Dizzy Miss Lizzy" (The Beatles Invite You to Take a Ticket to Ride, 7 June 1965)	Williams	Lennon	2:44
24.	"Kansas City / Hey-Hey-Hey-Hey!" (Pop Go the Beatles, 6 August 1963)	Leiber, Stoller / Penniman	McCartney	2:39
25.	"Set Fire to That Lot!" (Pop Go the Beatles, 30 July 1963)			0:28
26.	"Matchbox" (Pop Go the Beatles, 30 July 1963)	Perkins	Starr	1:58
27.	"I Forgot to Remember to Forget" (From Us to You, 18 May 1964)	Kesler, Feathers	Harrison	2:06
28.	"Love These Goon Shows!" (Pop Go the Beatles, 11 June 1963)			0:28
29.	"I Got to Find My Baby" (Pop Go the Beatles, 11 June 1963)	Clayton	Lennon	1:58
30.	"Ooh! My Soul" (Pop Go the Beatles, 27 August 1963)	Penniman	McCartney	1:38
31.	"Ooh! My Arms" (Pop Go the Beatles, 27 August 1963)			0:36
32.	"Don't Ever Change" (Pop Go the Beatles, 27 August 1963)	Goffin, King	Harrison and McCartney	2:05
33.	"Slow Down" (Pop Go the Beatles, 20 August 1963)	Williams	Lennon	2:38
34.	"Honey Don't" (Pop Go the Beatles, 3 September 1963)	Perkins	Lennon	2:13
35.	"Love Me Do" (Pop Go the Beatles, 23 July 1963)		McCartney, with Lennon	2:29
36.	"From Us to You (Closing)" (From Us to You, 1964)			0:38
Total length:				1:09:42

== Source programmes ==
The show's title and original broadcast date for each track, with the recording date in parentheses:

Saturday Club, 26 January 1963 (22 January 1963)

Disc 1

6. "Keep Your Hands off My Baby"

Pop Go the Beatles (2), 11 June 1963 (1 June 1963)

Disc 1

8. "Young Blood"
13. "Sha La La La La!"
14. "Baby It's You"

Disc 2

28. "Love These Goon Shows!"
29. "I Got to Find My Baby"

Pop Go the Beatles (3), 18 June 1963 (1 June 1963)

Disc 1

10. "Sure to Fall (In Love with You)"

Easy Beat, 23 June 1963 (19 June 1963)

Disc 1

11. "Some Other Guy"
12. "Thank You Girl"

Side by Side, 24 June 1963 (4 April 1963)

Disc 1

7. "I'll Be on My Way"

Pop Go the Beatles (5), 16 July 1963 (2 July 1963)

Disc 1

15. "That's All Right (Mama)"
16. "Carol"

- "What Is It, George?"

17. "Soldier of Love"
18. "A Little Rhyme"
19. "Clarabella"

Pop Go the Beatles (6), 23 July 1963 (10 July 1963)

Disc 1

25. "A Taste of Honey"

Disc 2

10. "Sweet Little Sixteen"
11. "1822!"
12. "Lonesome Tears in My Eyes"
13. "Nothin' Shakin' (But the Leaves on the Trees)"
17. "So How Come (No One Loves Me)"
35. "Love Me Do"

Pop Go the Beatles (7), 30 July 1963 (10 July 1963)

Disc 1

30. "Memphis, Tennessee"

Disc 2

14. "The Hippy Hippy Shake"
25. "Set Fire to That Lot!"
26. "Matchbox"

Pop Go the Beatles (8), 6 August 1963 (16 July 1963)

Disc 1

20. "I'm Gonna Sit Right Down and Cry (Over You)"
21. "Crying, Waiting, Hoping"
24. "To Know Her Is to Love Her"
28. "The Honeymoon Song"

Disc 2

24. "Kansas City / Hey-Hey-Hey-Hey!"

Pop Go the Beatles (9), 13 August 1963 (16 July 1963)

Disc 1

4. "I Got a Woman"
26. "Long Tall Sally"

Pop Go the Beatles (10), 20 August 1963 (16 July 1963)

Disc 2

15. "Glad All Over"
16. "I Just Don't Understand"
33. "Slow Down"

Saturday Club, 24 August 1963 (30 July 1963)

Disc 1

22. "Dear Wack!"
23. "You Really Got a Hold on Me"

Pop Go the Beatles (11), 27 August 1963 (1 August 1963)

Disc 1

9. "A Shot of Rhythm and Blues"

Disc 2

30. "Ooh! My Soul"
31. "Ooh! My Arms"
32. "Don't Ever Change"

Pop Go the Beatles (12), 3 September 1963 (1 August 1963)

Disc 2

34. "Honey Don't"

Pop Go the Beatles (13), 10 September 1963 (3 September 1963)

Disc 1

5. "Too Much Monkey Business"

Saturday Club, 5 October 1963 (7 September 1963)

Disc 1

31. "Lucille"

Easy Beat, 20 October 1963 (16 October 1963)

Disc 1

27. "I Saw Her Standing There"

The Public Ear, 3 November 1963 (9 October 1963)

Disc 1

1. "Beatles Greetings"

Saturday Club, 15 February 1964 (7 January 1964)

Disc 1

29. "Johnny B Goode"

From Us to You (2), 30 March 1964 (28 February 1964)

Disc 1

2. "From Us to You" (Opening)
32. "Can't Buy Me Love"
33. "From Fluff to You"
34. "Till There Was You"

Disc 2

- "Ringo? Yep!"

4. "I Wanna Be Your Man"
5. "Just a Rumour"
6. "Roll Over Beethoven"
7. "All My Loving"

- "From Us to You" (Closing)
From Us to You (3), 18 May 1964 (1 May 1964)

Disc 2

27. "I Forgot to Remember to Forget"

Top Gear, 16 July 1964 (14 July 1964)

Disc 2

1. "Crinsk Dee Night"
2. "A Hard Day's Night"
3. "Have a Banana!"
8. "Things We Said Today"

Top Gear, 26 November 1964 (17 November 1964)

Disc 1

3. "Riding on a Bus"

Disc 2

9. "She's a Woman"
18. "I Feel Fine"
19. "I'm a Loser"

Saturday Club, 26 December 1964 (25 November 1964)

Disc 2

20. "Everybody's Trying to Be My Baby"
21. "Rock and Roll Music"

The Beatles Invite You to Take a Ticket to Ride, 7 June 1965 (26 May 1965)

Disc 2

22. "Ticket to Ride"
23. "Dizzy Miss Lizzy"

== Personnel ==
- John Lennon – vocals, rhythm guitar, lead guitar, harmonica, organ
- Paul McCartney – vocals, bass guitar, electric piano
- George Harrison – lead guitar, rhythm guitar, vocals
- Ringo Starr – drums, vocals

== Charts ==
=== Weekly charts ===
Weekly chart performance for the original release
Chart (1994–95)	Peak position
Australian Albums (ARIA)	2
Austrian Albums (Ö3 Austria)	4
Canada Top Albums/CDs (RPM)	1
Finnish Albums (Suomen virallinen lista)	5
Dutch Albums (Album Top 100)	2
German Albums (Offizielle Top 100)	6
Hungarian Albums (MAHASZ)	39
Italian Albums (Musica e dischi)	3
New Zealand Albums (RMNZ)	4
Swedish Albums (Sverigetopplistan)	4
Swiss Albums (Schweizer Hitparade)	4
UK Albums (Official Charts)	1
US Billboard 200	3

Weekly chart performance for 2013 reissue
Chart (2013)	Peak position
Austrian Albums (Ö3 Austria)	34
Czech Albums (ČNS IFPI)	46
Danish Albums (Hitlisten)	35
Dutch Albums (Album Top 100)	58
French Albums (SNEP)	92
German Albums (Offizielle Top 100)	54
Irish Albums (IRMA)	57
Swiss Albums (Schweizer Hitparade)	41
UK Albums (Official Charts)	57
US Billboard 200	34

=== Year-end charts ===
Chart (1994)	Position
Dutch Albums (Album Top 100)	54

Chart (1995)	Position
Austrian Albums (Ö3 Austria)	41
German Albums (Offizielle Top 100)	82
Japanese Albums (Oricon)	53
US Billboard 200	46

== Certifications and sales ==
Certifications and sales for Live at the BBC
Region	Certification	Certified units/sales
Argentina (CAPIF)	Platinum	40,000^{^}
Australia (ARIA)	Platinum	70,000^{^}
Austria (IFPI Austria)	Gold	25,000^{*}
Canada (Music Canada)	8× Platinum	800,000^{^}
France (SNEP)	Platinum	300,000^{*}
Germany (BVMI)	Gold	250,000^{^}
Ireland (IRMA)	Gold	7,500^{^}
Japan (RIAJ)	Platinum	411,000
Netherlands (NVPI)	Gold	50,000^{^}
Spain (Promusicae)	Platinum	100,000^{^}
Switzerland (IFPI Switzerland)	Gold	25,000^{^}
United Kingdom (BPI)	2× Platinum	600,000^{^}
United States (RIAA)	4× Platinum	2,000,000^{^}
Summaries
Europe (IFPI)	Platinum	1,000,000^{*}
^{*} Sales figures based on certification alone.^{^} Shipments figures based on certification alone.

== See also ==
- Outline of the Beatles
- The Beatles timeline
