= Don't Ever Change =

Don't Ever Change may refer to:

- "Don't Ever Change" (House episode)
- "Don't Ever Change" (song), a 1961 song written by Gerry Goffin and Carole King
- "Don't Ever Change" (song), a song by The Kinks on their 1965 album Kinda Kinks
