= On the Way Up =

Studio album by Ann-Margret
- Released: 1962
- Venue: RCA Studio B, Nashville
- Genre: Jazz; pop; Rockabilly
- Label: RCA Victor
- Producer: Dick Peirce, Chet Atkins

Ann-Margret chronology
And Here She Is ... Ann-Margret (1961)	On the Way Up (1962)	The Vivacious One (1962)

Professional ratings
Review scores
Source	Rating
AllMusic	3/5 stars
Billboard	4/5 stars

On the Way Up is the second album by Swedish-American actress and singer Ann-Margret released by RCA Victor in 1962. The album was partly produced by Chet Atkins and recorded in Nashville, Tennessee.

The album contains the single "I Just Don't Understand", an American top 20 hit. The follow-up single, "What Am I Supposed to Do" peaked at No. 82 on the Billboard Hot 100 and No. 19 on the Easy Listening chart.

Billboard Magazine rated the album as 4 stars, noting "the bright canary is in sprightly, sexy vocal form on this package...she scores highest with "Oh Lonesome Me", "His Ring", "Slowly" and "My Last Date". Solid teen appeal item." In their review of the album, Cashbox noted that "for her second album for Victor, Ann-Margret gives an excellent demonstration of the original, warm, vibrant style that is quickly taking her to the upper reaches of stardom."

== Track listing ==
Side one
No.	Title	Writer(s)	Length
1.	"Oh, Lonesome Me"	Don Gibson	2:34
2.	"Slowly"	Otis Blackwell	2:05
3.	"Fever"	Eddie Cooley, Otis Blackwell	2:50
4.	"What Do You Want From Me"	Mike Cain	2:25
5.	"Heartbreak Hotel"	Mae Boren Axton, Tommy Durden, Elvis Presley	2:27
6.	"I Just Don't Understand"	Marijohn Wilkin, Kent Westberry	2:37

Side two
No.	Title	Writer(s)	Length
1.	"His Ring"	Bill Katz, Ruth Roberts	2:21
2.	"Could It Be"	Barry De Vorzon, Patti Ferguson	2:10
3.	"What Am I Supposed to Do"	Helen Carter	2:45
4.	"Let Me Go, Lover!"	Jenny Lou Carson, Fred Wise, Kathleen Twomey, Ben Weisman	2:58
5.	"Moon River"	Henry Mancini, Johnny Mercer	2:28
6.	"My Last Date (with You)"	Boudleaux Bryant, Floyd Cramer, Skeeter Davis	2:36

== Personnel ==
- Ann-Margret – vocals
- Chet Atkins – producer
- Dick Peirce – producer
- Don Robertson – conductor

== Charts ==
Title	Chart	Peak position
"I Just Don't Understand"	U.S Billboard Hot 100	17
"I Just Don't Understand"	Cash Box Charts	15
"I Just Don't Understand"	Record World Charts	10
"What Am I Supposed to Do"	U.S Billboard Hot 100	82
"What Am I Supposed to Do"	U.S Billboard Adult Contemporary	19
"What Am I Supposed to Do"	Cash Box Charts	89
"What Am I Supposed to Do"	Record World Charts	86
