= Where Have You Been (disambiguation) =

"Where Have You Been" is a 2012 song by Rihanna.

Where Have You Been may also refer to:

- "Where Have You Been" (Kelly Clarkson song), 2025
- Where Have You Been? (EP), a 2019 extended play by Jacob Sartorius
- "Where Have You Been (All My Life)", a 1962 song by Arthur Alexander
- "Where Have You Been (All My Night)", a 2017 song by Hey Violet from From the Outside
- "Where've You Been", a 1989 song by Kathy Mattea
- "Where Have You Been?", a 2002 song by Reel Big Fish from Cheer Up!

== See also ==
- Where Have You Been All My Life (disambiguation)
