= I'm Not Coming Home Anymore =

Song by Hank Williams
- Recorded: 1942, Montgomery
- Genre: Country
- Length: 2:51
- Label: MGM
- Songwriter(s): Hank Williams

"I'm Not Coming Home Any More" is a song by Hank Williams. It is one of his earliest compositions and recordings, having been recorded in 1942.

== Background ==
The owner of Griffin's Radio Shop in Montgomery recorded Williams at some point in the spring of 1942 singing several songs by Ernest Tubb, Red Foley, and Rex Griffin, as well as his own composition "I'm Not Coming Home Any More." Biographer Colin Escott states that "on the skimpy evidence of that one song, his style was intact very early...he sings higher than he would in later life, but the timbre of his voice and his phrasing are remarkably similar to his first professional recordings five years later."
