= Where Have You Been All My Life =

Where Have You Been All My Life may refer to:

- "Where Have You Been (All My Life)", a song written by Barry Mann and Cynthia Weil, first released by Arthur Alexander in 1962 and covered by the Beatles, Gene Vincent, Gerry and the Pacemakers, and the Searchers
- Where Have You Been All My Life?, a 2016 album by Villagers
- "Where Have You Been All My Life", a song written by Wayland Holyfield, released as a single in 1978 by Roy Clark
- "Where Have You Been All My Life?", music by Ben Oakland, lyrics by Herb Magidson, from the 1936 film Hats Off
- "Where Have You Been All My Life", a track by Guided by Voices from the 2019 album Zeppelin Over China
- "Where Have You Been All My Life", a track by Perry Farrell from the 2019 album Kind Heaven
- "Where Have You Been All My Life", a track by Ted Nugent from the 1975 album Ted Nugent
- "(Where Have You Been) All My Life"' a track by Double Exposure from the 1979 album Locker Room
- "Where Have You Been All My Life?", a number by Sam Kenyon from the 2018 stage musical Miss Littlewood
- "Where Have You Been All My Life?", a season 1 episode of Passion Cove

== See also ==
- Where Have You Been (disambiguation)
- "Where Have You Been (All My Night)", a song by Hey Violet
