= I Just Don't Understand =

1961 song performed by Ann-Margret

Single by Ann-Margret

from the album On the Way Up
- B-side: "I Don't Hurt Anymore"
- Released: June 1961
- Recorded: 1961
- Length: 2:37
- Label: RCA Victor
- Songwriters: Marijohn Wilkin, Kent Westberry
- Producers: Chet Atkins, Dick Pierce

Ann-Margret singles chronology
"I Just Don't Understand" (1961)	"It Do Me So Good" (1961)

"I Just Don't Understand"

Song by the Beatles

from the album Live at the BBC
- Released: 30 November 1994
- Recorded: 16 July 1963
- Genre: Rock
- Length: 2:47
- Label: Apple
- Songwriters: Marijohn Wilkin, Kent Westberry
- Producer: Terry Henebery

"I Just Don't Understand" is a song written by Marijohn Wilkin and Kent Westberry, released by Swedish-born singer and American citizen Ann-Margret. It charted at No. 17 on the US Billboard Hot 100 chart in 1961. It was one of the first records to feature a fuzz-tone guitar. It was later recorded by the Beatles on 16 July 1963 at the BBC Paris Studios, London, for the Pop Go the Beatles radio show and appeared on their 1994 compilation album Live at the BBC, with lead vocals by John Lennon.

Time Magazine reviewed the song, commenting that Ann-Margret "is that rarity in the record field: a girl singer who can really make a pop song pop."

In 1965, Australian pop star Normie Rowe presented a rockier version. This appeared on the B-side of his Australian top 10 hit, "I (Who Have Nothing)".

The song was also covered by Willie Nelson, Jerry Reed, Les Paul and Freddie and the Dreamers.

American indie rock band Spoon included a cover of the song on their 2014 album They Want My Soul.

== The Beatles personnel ==
- John Lennon – vocals, rhythm guitar
- Paul McCartney – backing vocals, bass
- George Harrison – backing vocals, lead guitar
- Ringo Starr – drums

== Charts ==
Chart performance for "I Just Don't Understand"
Chart (1961)	Peak position
U.S Billboard Hot 100	17
U.S. Cash Box Charts	15
U.S. Record World Charts	10
Quebec (ADISQ)	30
Canada (CHUM Chart)	6
