= California Ballroom =

Music venue in Bedfordshire, England

Coordinates: 51.8780°N 0.5360°W

The California Ballroom, nicknamed "Cali" and "Soul City", was a 2000-capacity music venue, being one of the United Kingdom's best-known soul music venues outside London. Located in Whipsnade Road, Dunstable, Bedfordshire, the venue was open from 1960 to 1979.

The opening act in 1960 was pop singer Russ Sainty. Soul artists appearing included Stevie Wonder, Ike & Tina Turner, Roy Ayers, Brass Construction and Grover Washington, Jr. It also hosted rock acts including The Detours (later named The Who), The Rolling Stones, Cream, Jimi Hendrix, Pink Floyd, The Clash and The Damned, Killing Floor, Ten Years After, Jethro Tull, Chicken Shack and The Herd.
