= I'm Gonna Sit Right Down and Cry (over You) =

1953 song by Howard Biggs, Joe Thomas

"I'm Gonna Sit Right Down and Cry (over You)" is a popular song written in 1953 by Joe Thomas and Howard Biggs and originally recorded by Roy Hamilton in 1954. Since then, it became something of a minor pop standard, largely due to several well-received versions of the song. It is best known for appearing on Elvis Presley's first album, and for a performance of the song by the Beatles (which appears on their Live at the BBC album). The Beatles also performed the song at the Star-Club in Hamburg on New Year's Eve, 31 December 1962, during their fifth and final Hamburg residency. This version appears on their album, Live! at the Star-Club in Hamburg, Germany; 1962.

== The Beatles version ==
"I'm Gonna Sit Right Down and Cry (over You)"

Song by The Beatles

from the album Live at the BBC
- Released: 30 November 1994
- Recorded: 16 July 1963
- Genre: Rock and roll
- Length: 2:01
- Songwriters: Joe Thomas and Howard Biggs
- Producer: Terry Henebery

The Beatles recorded their version on July 16, 1963, at the BBC Paris Studios in London for the Pop Go the Beatles radio show. The recording went unreleased until 1994 when it was released on Live at the BBC.

The Beatles version is different than Presley's version in that is more rock 'n' roll while Presley's version is in a more rockabilly country style.

This is one of four Presley songs recorded by the Beatles for BBC radio, the others being "I Forgot to Remember to Forget", "That's All Right" and "I Got A Woman".

=== Personnel ===
- John Lennon – vocals, rhythm guitar
- Paul McCartney – vocals, bass
- George Harrison – lead guitar
- Ringo Starr – drums

== See also ==
- 1953 in music
