= Glad All Over (Carl Perkins song) =

1957 song recorded by Carl Perkins

1957 Sun 78, 287.

"Glad All Over" is a 1957 song recorded by rock and roll and rockabilly artist Carl Perkins, "The Rockin' Guitar Man", at Sun Records in 1957. It was released as a 45 and 78 single, Sun 287, on January 6, 1958 (b/w "Lend Me Your Comb"). It was written by Aaron Schroeder, Sid Tepper, and Roy Bennett. It is not the same song as the single "Glad All Over" released in 1963 by The Dave Clark Five.

A performance of the song was featured in the 1957 film Jamboree, where Carl Perkins and his band perform the song in a recording studio in a scene similar to Elvis Presley's studio performance in Jailhouse Rock along with Scotty Moore and Bill Black. The Carl Perkins band consisted of Carl Perkins on lead guitar and vocals, Jay Perkins on rhythm guitar, Clayton Perkins on upright bass, and W.S. "Fluke" Holland on drums, who later became the drummer for Johnny Cash, who called him "The Father of the Drums".

"Glad All Over" was the last single Carl Perkins released on Sun Records. The recording was also released as a 45 in the UK on the London Records label as 45-HLS 8527 backed with "Forever Yours" and appeared on the Warner Bros. soundtrack album for the movie Jamboree. The song was published by Magnificent Music, BMI. In 1978, Sun Records Corporation under owner Shelby Singleton re-released the song as part of the Sun Golden Treasure Series as Sun 24 with "Lend Me Your Comb" as the flipside.

== The Beatles version ==
"Glad All Over"

Song by The Beatles

from the album Live at the BBC and On Air - Live at the BBC Volume 2
- Released: 30 November 1994 (Live at the BBC); 11 November 2013 (On Air - Live at the BBC Volume 2)
- Recorded: 16 July 1963 (Live at the BBC); 24 August 1963 (On Air - Live at the BBC Volume 2)
- Genre: Rock
- Length: 1:53 (Live at the BBC); 1:52 (On Air - Live at the BBC Volume 2)
- Label: Apple
- Songwriter(s): Aaron Schroeder, Sid Tepper, and Roy Bennett
- Producer(s): Terry Henebery

The Beatles recorded "Glad All Over" on two occasions in 1963 for BBC radio sessions, with George Harrison on lead vocals. The first of these, recorded on July 16, 1963, was released in 1994 on Live at the BBC.

On November 11, 2013, a second version recorded by The Beatles for the BBC Saturday Club radio program on July 30, 1963, appeared on the On Air – Live at the BBC Volume 2 collection.

=== Personnel ===
- George Harrison – vocals, lead guitar
- Paul McCartney – bass
- John Lennon – rhythm guitar
- Ringo Starr – drums

== Other versions ==
George Harrison also performed the song on the 1985 HBO/Cinemax cable special Blue Suede Shoes: A Rockabilly Session with Carl Perkins. The Jeff Beck Group recorded the song on their self-titled 1972 Epic album that was produced by Steve Cropper. Brian Setzer performed the song at the Dallas Guitar Show on October 27, 1990, and recorded the song on his 2005 Rockabilly Riot!: Volume One album. The 1960s group The Searchers also recorded a version of the song on their April 1964 Pye release, It's The Searchers. The rockabilly band The Sureshots have performed the song in concert in 2011. John Lennon also recorded the song as an outtake.

== Sources ==
- Perkins, Carl, and David McGee. Go, Cat, Go!. Hyperion Press, 1996, pages 253–254. ISBN 0-7868-6073-1
- Morrison, Craig. Go Cat Go!: Rockabilly Music and Its Makers. University of Illinois Press, 1998.
