= Hippy Hippy Shake =

1959 song originally performed by Chan Romero

- Australian release picture sleeve

Single by Chan Romero
- Released: 1959
- Genre: Rock and roll
- Length: 1:43
- Label: Del-Fi
- Songwriter: Chan Romero

Official audio
- "The Hippy Hippy Shake" on YouTube

"Hippy Hippy Shake" is a song written and recorded by American rock and roll performer Chan Romero in 1959. That same year, it reached No. 3 in Australia. Romero was 17 years old when he wrote the song.

== Personnel ==
- Chan Romero – guitar, vocals
- Barney Kessel – rhythm guitar
- Irving Ashby – upright bass
- René Hall – Danelectro bass guitar
- Earl Palmer – drums

== The Beatles version ==
"The Hippy Hippy Shake"

Song by The Beatles

from the album Live at the BBC and On Air – Live at the BBC Volume 2
- Released: November 30, 1994 (Live at the BBC); November 11, 2013 (On Air – Live at the BBC Volume 2)
- Recorded: July 10, 1963 (Live at the BBC); September 10, 1963 (On Air – Live at the BBC Volume 2)
- Genre: Rock and roll
- Length: 1:50 (Live at the BBC); 1:46 (On Air – Live at the BBC Volume 2)
- Songwriter: Chan Romero
- Producer: Terry Henebery

Performance audio
- "The Hippy Hippy Shake" (Live at the BBC for Pop Go The Beatles / 10 September 1963) on YouTube

A live version of "Hippy Hippy Shake" can be found on The Beatles album Live at the BBC. That version was recorded in July 1963, almost certainly pre-dating The Swinging Blue Jeans recording. The Beatles also played the song in their early days when they performed in small clubs. It is included on Live! At the Star-Club, Hamburg 1962. Another version, recorded on 10 September 1963 for Pop Go the Beatles, can be found on On Air – Live at the BBC Volume 2. The Beatles also revisited the song during the sessions for the Let It Be album and film in January 1969. That version is currently unreleased but is available on various bootleg recordings.

=== Personnel ===
- Paul McCartney – vocals, bass
- John Lennon – rhythm guitar
- George Harrison – lead guitar
- Ringo Starr – drums

== Other cover versions ==
- A cover version by Italian rocker Little Tony appeared in the same year and found moderate success in the United Kingdom and Italy.

"Hippy Hippy Shake"

Single by The Swinging Blue Jeans
- B-side: "Now I Must Go"
- Released: December 6, 1963
- Recorded: 1963
- Genre: Rock and roll
- Label: His Master's Voice Pop 1242 (UK); Imperial (U.S.)
- Songwriter: Chan Romero

The Swinging Blue Jeans singles chronology
"Do You Know" (1963)	"Hippy Hippy Shake" (1963)	"Good Golly Miss Molly" (1964)

Official audio
- "The Hippy Hippy Shake" on YouTube

- A version by Wales-based band Pat Harris and The Blackjacks was released on Pye and preceded by two months that released by The Swinging Blue Jeans, whose hit version was released in December 1963. This single reached No. 2 in the UK Singles Chart and Canada's CHUM Chart, and No. 24 in the United States charts in early 1964. The song, with a guitar solo by Ray Ennis, became their biggest hit in both the UK and North America. With this song the Swinging Blue Jeans became one of the earliest British acts to chart in the US during the British Invasion, following The Beatles, Dusty Springfield, and The Dave Clark Five, and debuting the same week as The Searchers.
- The song was covered by the glam rock band Mud in 1974, being released on their album Mud Rock which reached No. 8 in the UK Albums Chart.
- British garage rock musician Billy Childish and his band The Milkshakes also recorded a cover on their 1984 album 20 Rock And Roll Hits of the 50s and 60s.
- The song was also covered by Davy Jones in 1987 as the B-side of his single "After Your Heart".
- The song was also covered by the band The Georgia Satellites in 1988. That same year, it reached the Billboard Hot 100 (No. 45), the Mainstream Rock Chart (No. 13), and No. 46 in Canada.

== In popular culture ==
The song was included in the films The Men Who Stare at Goats, X-Men: First Class, “The Secret Life of Bees”, Uncle Buck, Angels in the Outfield and Austin Powers: International Man of Mystery. The cover version by The Georgia Satellites is featured in the films Cocktail and It Takes Two, as well as an episode of The Simpsons.

In 1979, The B-52's song "Dance This Mess Around", which featured numerous 1960s pop culture references, repeated the line, "Hippy hippy forward hippy hippy hippy hippy hippy shake", an allusion to this song.

In the Full House episode "The House Meets the Mouse", the fictional band Jesse and the Rippers performed this song live at Walt Disney World. In 2013, Jesse and the Rippers again performed this song on Late Night with Jimmy Fallon as part of their one-night-only reunion.
