= Everybody's Trying to Be My Baby =

1936 Song by Rex Griffin, popularized by Carl Perkins and the Beatles

"Everybody's Tryin' to Be My Baby"

Single by Rex Griffin
- Released: November 1936
- Recorded: March 2, 1936
- Studio: Roosevelt Hotel, New Orleans
- Genre: Hillbilly
- Length: 2:59
- Label: Decca 5294
- Songwriter: Rex Griffin

"Everybody's Trying to Be My Baby"

Song by Carl Perkins

from the album Dance Album of Carl Perkins
- Published: November 12, 1957 Knox Music, Inc.
- Released: May 1957
- Recorded: March 1956
- Studio: Memphis Recording Service, Memphis, Tennessee
- Genre: Rockabilly, rock and roll
- Length: 2:15
- Label: Sun Records
- Songwriter: Carl Perkins
- Producer: Sam Phillips

"Everybody's Trying to Be My Baby" is a rockabilly song credited to Carl Perkins. Based on a 1936 song written by singer/songwriter Rex Griffin, it achieved widespread popularity when it was released in 1957 by Perkins and covered by the Beatles in 1964. Carl Perkins wrote new music in a rock and roll style and added a new verse, but it was based on the Rex Griffin song.

== Composition ==
"Everybody's Tryin' to Be My Baby" was written and recorded in 1936 by Decca artist Rex Griffin. On March 2, 1936 at the Roosevelt Hotel in New Orleans, Louisiana, it was among ten self-penned tracks recorded that day by the recently signed artist. Griffin was accompanied only by his guitar. The song was released on Decca 5294 in November 1936 to little notice. Although the song was never published, it was covered by Johnny Barfield and Roy Newman in 1939. Griffin copyrighted the song on January 22, 1944.

In March 1956, Carl Lee Perkins was working at Sun Studios in Memphis, Tennessee on follow-up material to "Blue Suede Shoes," which had been recorded the previous December. He brought in a song that he had written called "Everybody's Trying to Be My Baby." Shortly after the song was recorded, Perkins and his brother were in a serious auto accident. The song and album were not released until May 1957. Perkins was listed as the sole writer when Knox Music, Inc. published the song on November 12, 1957. Perkins contributed a rock and roll arrangement, along with some minor lyric changes by adding a new verse.

The recording was later re-released on the 1961 Sun Records album, 'Teen Beat: The Best of Carl Perkins', 'Carl Perkins' Original Golden Hits' (Sun International, 1969), 'Original Sun Greatest Hits' by Rhino Records in 1986, and further compilations.

== The Beatles' version ==
"Everybody's Trying to Be My Baby"
- Sheet music cover

Song by the Beatles
- Released: December 4, 1964 (UK: Beatles for Sale); December 15, 1964 (US: Beatles '65)
- Recorded: October 18, 1964
- Studio: EMI, London
- Genre: Rock and roll, rockabilly
- Length: 2:23
- Label: Parlophone (UK); Capitol (US)
- Songwriter: Carl Perkins
- Producer: George Martin

The Beatles recorded "Everybody's Trying to Be My Baby" on October 18, 1964, at EMI Studios, London, with George Harrison (a lifelong fan of Perkins) on vocals. Harrison's vocals were heavily processed with the STEED effect. It was first released as the final track on Beatles for Sale in the United Kingdom later that year, and likewise as the concluding track on the North American album Beatles '65.

The Beatles' recording finishes with a false ending, with the final phrase repeating itself after the song seems to have stopped. A version recorded live at the Star-Club in Hamburg in December 1962 contained four of these musical phrases.

Live performances of the Beatles' "Everybody's Trying to Be My Baby" were recorded in June 1963 for the BBC radio program Pop Go the Beatles, and in November 1964 for Saturday Club. The latter recording can be heard on Live at the BBC.

The Beatles continued to perform the song after their studio recording was released. It was included in the on stage set list in their 1965 European tour of France, Italy and Spain and their ten city August tour of the United States. The performance from the Paris concert was videotaped and broadcast on French television later that year. Audio from the performance recorded at New York's Shea Stadium on August 15, 1965, edited from the 1966 documentary film, was later included in Anthology 2.

In 1976, Capitol released the song on the compilation album Rock 'n' Roll Music.

George Harrison performed the song with Carl Perkins on the Cinemax cable special Blue Suede Shoes: A Rockabilly Session in 1985. Bruce Springsteen performed the song live in concert in 1998 as a tribute to Carl Perkins on news of his death. Johnny Cash’s mid-90s version of the song backed by Carl Perkins and Tom Petty and the Heartbreakers was included on his 2003 concept-compilation album Unearthed.

In 2016, the song was featured as a bonus track on the remastered Live at the Hollywood Bowl album in a live performance from August 30, 1965 in conjunction with the release of the Ron Howard concert film The Beatles: Eight Days a Week.

=== Personnel ===
- George Harrison – double-tracked lead vocals, lead guitar
- John Lennon – acoustic rhythm guitar, tambourine
- Paul McCartney – bass guitar
- Ringo Starr – drums
