= Russ Sainty =

English musical artist (1936–2021)

- Born: Alfred Charles Sainty; April 1936; Leyton, Essex, England
- Died: 28 November 2021 (aged 85)
- Genres: Rock and roll, pop music
- Occupation: Singer

Russ Sainty (born Alfred Charles Sainty; April 1936 –28 November 2021) was an English rock and roll and pop singer.

== Life and career ==
Sainty was born in Leyton, Essex. He first performed as a singer with the Buddy Monroe Five, before becoming a regular at the 2i's Coffee Bar in Soho. He was a contemporary of Cliff Richard and the Shadows, and was often backed by Tony Sheridan's band. He then joined a band, the Nu-Notes, who became known around London for performing versions of current American hit records. Around this time, he adopted the professional name of Russ Sainty. In late 1958 he turned down the chance to record Lionel Bart's song "Living Doll", which became a hit for Cliff Richard.

In 1959, Sainty passed an audition for the BBC, which led to him making regular appearances on radio programmes including Saturday Club. He was the opening act at the Butlin's holiday camp in Bognor Regis, and in 1960 at the California Ballroom in Dunstable, where he became a regular performer.

Sainty released several singles on various record labels, including Decca, Top Rank, and His Master's Voice in the early 1960s. None became chart hits, but he is best remembered for his version of "Send Me the Pillow You Dream On", a hit at the time for Johnny Tillotson. In 1963, he performed at the top of a bill with support from The Rolling Stones. He continued performing regularly at the California Ballroom until 1965, making a total of 338 appearances there.

He married and opened a restaurant, and continued to perform in clubs in Britain and South Africa, as well as on cruise ships. In 1982, he became entertainments manager for Warners at Hayling Island. He later performed as a member of The Dallas Boys, as well as making occasional solo appearances. In 2008 he published an autobiography, King of the 'Cali'.

He died in 2021, aged 85.
