= Clarabella (song) =

1956 song by the Jodimars

Song by The Beatles

from the album Live at the BBC
- Released: 30 November 1994
- Recorded: 2 July 1963
- Genre: Pop
- Length: 2:40
- Songwriter: Frank Pingatore
- Producer: Terry Henebery

"Clarabella" is a pop song composed by Frank Pingatore and recorded by the Jodimars (a group made of former members of Bill Haley & His Comets) in 1956. Today, it is best known for being recorded by the Beatles for the radio programme Pop Go the Beatles on 2 July 1963, which was broadcast on the 16th of that month. It was released commercially on compact disc much later, on the 1994 compilation album Live at the BBC, although years earlier a similar rendition by Billy Preston (who would later work with the Beatles on their later recordings) was performed on a 1965 episode of Shindig!. In 2003 the White Stripes recorded a performance of the song live in concert.

== The Beatles personnel ==
- Paul McCartney – vocals, bass
- John Lennon – harmonica, rhythm guitar
- George Harrison – lead guitar
- Ringo Starr – drums

== See also ==
- 1963 in music
- Pop music
