= Ooh! My Soul =

1958 song by Little Richard

Single by Little Richard

from the album Little Richard
- B-side: "True Fine Mama"
- Released: May 1958
- Studio: J&M Studio, New Orleans, Louisiana
- Label: Specialty
- Songwriter(s): Richard Penniman
- Producer(s): Robert "Bumps" Blackwell

Little Richard singles chronology
"Good Golly, Miss Molly" (1958)	"Ooh! My Soul" (1958)	"Baby Face/I'll Never Let You Go (Boo Hoo Hoo Hoo)" (1958)

"Ooh! My Soul"

Song by The Beatles

from the album Live at the BBC
- Released: 30 November 1994 (UK); 5 December 1994 (US)
- Recorded: 1 August 1963, at the Playhouse Theatre, Manchester
- Genre: Rock
- Length: 1:37
- Songwriter(s): Richard Penniman
- Producer(s): Terry Henebery

"Ooh! My Soul", sometimes spelled "Oh My Soul", is a 1958 song by Little Richard. It first appeared on a May 1958 single, then on his eponymous second album. It was subsequently recorded by the Beatles in 1963 for the BBC, and by Big Brother and the Holding Company in 1966.

== The Beatles version ==
The Beatles recorded the song for a performance at the Playhouse Theatre in Manchester with McCartney on lead vocals. Their recording is shorter than Richard's version. The recording was unavailable until it was released officially on Live at the BBC.

=== Personnel ===
- Paul McCartney – vocals, bass
- John Lennon – rhythm guitar
- George Harrison – lead guitar
- Ringo Starr – drums

Personnel per The Beatles Bible
