= Carol (Chuck Berry song) =

Song written by Chuck Berry

Single by Chuck Berry
- B-side: "Hey Pedro"
- Released: August 1958
- Recorded: 12 June 1958
- Studio: Chess (Chicago)
- Genre: Rock and roll
- Length: 2:21
- Label: Chess
- Songwriter: Chuck Berry

Chuck Berry singles chronology
"Beautiful Delilah" (1958)	"Carol" (1958)	"Sweet Little Rock and Roller" / "Jo Jo Gunne" (1958)

"Carol" is a song written and recorded by Chuck Berry, first released by Chess Records in 1958, with "Hey Pedro" as the B-side. The single reached number 18 on Billboard's Hot 100 and number 12 on the magazine's R&B chart. In 1959, it was included on his third studio album, Berry Is on Top.

Berry employs his well-known guitar figure, which AllMusic critic Matthew Greenwald describes as "a guitar lick that indeed propelled not just Berry's greatest works, but the rock & roll genre itself."

== Charts ==
Chart	Peak position
US Billboard Hot 100	18
US Billboard R&B Singles	12

== Other versions ==
=== The Rolling Stones ===
The Rolling Stones recorded "Carol" in 1964 for their debut album and a live version was released on Get Yer Ya-Ya's Out! (1969). A live recording from Oakland in November 1969 is included in the bootleg album, Live'r Than You'll Ever Be.

=== The Beatles ===
The Beatles recorded a version of the song for Pop Go the Beatles in July 1963. The song appears on their 1994 album Live at the BBC.
