= A Shot of Rhythm and Blues =

1961 single by Arthur Alexander

Single by Arthur Alexander
- A-side: "You Better Move On"
- Released: 1961
- Genre: Rhythm and blues
- Length: 1:44
- Label: Dot Records
- Songwriter: Terry Thompson

Official audio
- "A Shot of Rhythm and Blues" on YouTube

"A Shot of Rhythm and Blues"

Song by the Beatles

from the album Live at the BBC
- Released: 1994
- Recorded: August 1, 1963
- Studio: Playhouse Theatre, Manchester
- Genre: Rock and roll, rhythm and blues
- Length: 2:14
- Label: Apple Records
- Songwriter: Terry Thompson
- Producer: George Martin

"A Shot of Rhythm and Blues" is a song written by Terry Thompson and first recorded by US soul singer Arthur Alexander. It was originally released in the United States in 1961 and in the United Kingdom the following year, as the B-side of "You Better Move On".

The song is a rhythm and blues number, featuring only blues chords. It begins as a twelve-bar blues, but then diverges from that standard structure into a more distinctive composition.

== Cover versions ==
Johnny Kidd & the Pirates released the song as a single in November 1962 (b/w "I Can Tell": His Master's Voice 45-POP 1088). It features Johnny Kidd on vocals, Mick Green on lead guitar, Johnny Spence on bass, and Frank Farley on drums.

The song, along with "Some Other Guy", became a standard on the 1960s Mersey scene, particularly at the Cavern Club, and was covered by Cilla Black, Sam "T-Bird" Jensen, the Beatles, and Gerry and the Pacemakers.

The Beatles recorded "A Shot of Rhythm and Blues" three times for the BBC in 1963, with John Lennon on lead vocals each time. One of the versions was included on the album Live at the BBC, released in 1994. The critic Robert Christgau called it and three other covers on that album as being among the Beatles' greatest covers.

In July 1963 Cilla Black recorded the song during her first-ever recording session at Abbey Road Studios. Cilla subsequently passed this audition and signed a recording contract with Parlophone Records. A take from this recording session was included on the 1997 album 1963–1973: The Abbey Road Decade. In the TV series Cilla, "A Shot of Rhythm and Blues" was one of the songs sung by Sheridan Smith.

Dave Edmunds covered the song on his 1975 album Subtle as a Flying Mallet. It is also heard in the 1974 Stardust film.

Van Morrison and Linda Gail Lewis performed the song on their 2000 album You Win Again.

The song was also covered by the Flamin' Groovies on their compilation album, Flamin' Groovies Collection.

Buffalo covered it in 1972 under the title "Just a Little Rock and Roll". It was later released on the Aztec Music remaster of their debut album, Dead Forever....
