= Richie Barrett =

- Born: Richard Barrett; July 14, 1933; Philadelphia, Pennsylvania, US
- Died: August 3, 2006 (aged 73) Gladwyne, Pennsylvania, US
- Occupations: Singer; record producer; songwriter
- Years active: 1950s–2006
- Formerly of: Frankie Lymon & the Teenagers; The Chantels; Little Anthony & the Imperials; The Valentines; The Three Degrees; Sheila Ferguson

Richard Barrett (July 14, 1933 – August 3, 2006), also known as Richie Barrett, was an American singer, record producer, and songwriter.

== Biography ==
Barrett was born in Philadelphia in 1933. In the 1950s, he was a record producer, influential in shaping the rhythm and blues sound. Barrett discovered and promoted Frankie Lymon & the Teenagers, the Chantels, Little Anthony & the Imperials, the Valentines, and Philadelphia's the Three Degrees. He managed the Chantels in the 1950s, and later managed the Three Degrees from the early 1960s until the early 1980s, producing many of their albums, and conducting the orchestra at their live shows. As an artist, he is most famous for co-writing (with Leiber and Stoller) and recording, as Richie Barrett, the song "Some Other Guy".

Barrett sang lead for the Valentines from 1954 to 1957. Ronnie Bright, who later joined the Cadillacs and the Coasters, sang bass. Barrett co-wrote two songs with Carl Hogan (also from the Valentines). One was "Be Sure My Love," which was recorded by the Dubs on Gone Records in 1958; and another, "So Much," was recorded by Little Anthony & the Imperials on End Records in 1958, and also recorded by the Attributes. On the Chantels' single "Maybe" (1958), Barrett played piano, bass, and drums. Barrett produced several of the Chantels' records.

Barrett's first single was a cover of the Fleetwoods' "Come Softly to Me", with the Chantels as backing vocalists. He recorded "Some Other Guy" in 1962, a tune modeled on Ray Charles' "What'd I Say" and was assured immortality, if not a hit single, following cover versions performed by the Beatles and other Liverpool groups of the time, including the Searchers and the Big Three. A clip of the Beatles performing the song at the Cavern was shown on a regional television program screened by Granada TV in the north-west of England in August or September 1962 shortly after the band had fired their previous drummer Pete Best and replaced him with Ringo Starr, and this low-quality footage has been included on many videos and DVDs since that time.

In 1998, Ben Vereen portrayed Barrett in Why Do Fools Fall in Love, a film biography about Frankie Lymon.

== Death ==
Barrett died of pancreatic cancer in Gladwyne, Pennsylvania, on August 3, 2006, at age 73.

== Discography ==
=== Singles by the Valentines ===
- "Summer Love"/"For You" (Bruce, 1954, unreleased, as the Dreamers)
- "Tonight Kathleen"/"Summer Love" (Old Town 1009, 1954)
- "Lily Maebelle"/"Falling for You" (Rama 171, 1955)
- "I Love You Darling"/"Hand Me Down Love" (Rama 181, 1955)
- "Christmas Prayer"/"Kiss Me" (Rama 186, 1955)
- "C'est la vie"/"C'est la vie" (Rama 194, 1956, with the Wrens but not credited)
- "Why"/"The Woo Woo Train" (Rama 196, 1956)
- "Twenty Minutes Before the Hour"/"I'll Never Let You Go" (Rama 201, 1956)
- "Nature's Creation"/"My Story of Love" (Rama 208, 1956)
- "Don't Say Goodnight"/"I Cried Oh, Oh" (Rama 228, 1957)

=== Solo singles ===
- "Smoke Gets in Your Eyes"/"Remember Me" (MGM 12616, 1958, as Dickie Barrett)
- "Body and Soul"/"The Party" (MGM 12659, 1958)
- "Lovely One"/"The Snake and the Bookworm" (20th Century Fox 150, 1959)
- "Come Softly to Me"/"Walking Through Dreamland" (Gone 5056, 1959, with the Chantels)
- "Summer's Love"/"All Is Forgiven" (Gone 5060, 1959, with the Chantels)
- "Lovable"/"Only One Way" (Metro 20006, 1959)
- "Dream On"/"I Am Yours" (Seville 104, 1960, as Richard Barrett and the Sevilles)
- "Some Other Guy"/"Tricky Dicky" (Atlantic 2142, 1962, as Richie Barrett)
- "Summer's Love"/"Let Me Down Easy" (Crackerjack 4012, 1963, as Richie Barrett)
- "I Will Love You"/"I Will Love You (Instrumental)" (Swan 4228, as Richie Barrett)
