= Some Other Guy =

1962 single by Richie Barrett, later covered by the Beatles

Single by Richie Barrett
- B-side: "Tricky Dicky"
- Released: 1962
- Genre: Rhythm and blues
- Label: Atlantic
- Songwriters: Jerry Leiber, Mike Stoller, Richard Barrett

Richie Barrett singles chronology
| "Dream On" (1960) | "Some Other Guy" (1962) | "Summer's Love" (1963) |

"Some Other Guy" is a rhythm and blues song, written by Jerry Leiber, Mike Stoller and Richie Barrett. First released as a single by Barrett, it featured an electric piano, then an unusual sound in pop music. Covered shortly afterwards by Liverpool's the Big Three and the Beatles, the song was a standard in the Merseybeat scene.

== The Beatles version ==
"Some Other Guy"

Song by the Beatles

from the album Live at the BBC
- Released: 30 November 1994
- Recorded: 19 June 1963
- Genre: Rock and roll
- Length: 2:01
- Label: Apple
- Songwriters: Jerry Leiber, Mike Stoller, Richard Barrett
- Producer: Ron Belchier (post-production by George Martin)

The song was part of the Beatles' early repertoire, and film footage of The Beatles performing it live is the only known film with synchronized sound showing the group at the Cavern Club. The grainy footage features John Lennon and Paul McCartney singing the song's melody on 22 August 1962. It is also the first film of Ringo Starr as the Beatles drummer, Pete Best having left the band the week before. At the end of the song, a fan in the audience can be heard shouting "We want Pete!" This footage was featured in Anthology, while a BBC live version was released on the album Live at the BBC in 1994.

McCartney stated: "It is a great song ... It really got us started because that's one of the earliest bits of film of The Beatles. It was the song we sang when Granada Television came to the Cavern. It was also a bit of a muso song..." Lennon noted in a 1968 interview, "I’d like to make a record like "Some Other Guy." I haven't done one that satisfies me as much as that satisfied me ... I’m not being modest. I mean, we’re still trying it." The Beatles play it in the key of D, with a slow A–C–D intro and second interval I–♭VII–I on every tonic (and the equivalent for IV and V). The "muso song" reference may relate to it being early example of a rock & roll song topped and tailed by a ♭VII–I cadence.

Pete Best released a cover on his 1965 album, Best of The Beatles. Best's version and The Beatles' version are similar in sound and structure.

In the three-part TV series Cilla featuring Sheridan Smith playing Cilla Black, Smith sings the song as "Some Other Girl", but otherwise her lyrics are the Barrett originals (save for "Some other girl, now, has just thrown water on my hand"). Smith also starts singing the line "Some other girl, now, is sipping up the honey like a yellow dog", but the scene is cut before the line is completed. She sings the line, "is breaking the padlock off my pad" three times.
