= Sweet Little Sixteen =

1958 single by Chuck Berry

Single by Chuck Berry

from the album One Dozen Berrys
- B-side: "Reelin' and Rockin'"
- Released: January 1958
- Recorded: December 29–30, 1957
- Studio: Chess (Chicago)
- Genre: Rock and roll
- Length: 3:03
- Label: Chess 1683
- Songwriter: Chuck Berry
- Producers: Leonard and Phil Chess

Chuck Berry singles chronology
"Rock and Roll Music" (1957)	"Sweet Little Sixteen" (1958)	"Johnny B. Goode" (1958)

"Sweet Little Sixteen" is a rock and roll song written and first recorded by Chuck Berry, who released it as a single in January 1958. His performance of it at that year's Newport Jazz Festival was included in the documentary film Jazz on a Summer's Day. It reached number two on the Billboard Hot 100, one of two of Berry's second-highest positions—along with Johnny Rivers' cover of "Memphis, Tennessee"—on that chart (surpassed only by "My Ding-A-Ling", which reached number one in 1972). "Sweet Little Sixteen" also reached number one on the R&B Best Sellers chart. In the UK, it reached number 16 on the UK Singles Chart. Rolling Stone magazine ranked the song number 272 on its list of the "500 Greatest Songs of All Time" in 2004. He used the same melody on an earlier song, "The Little Girl From Central" recorded on Checkmate in 1955.

== Personnel ==
Recorded December 29–30, 1957

- Chuck Berry – vocals and guitar
- Lafayette Leake – piano
- Willie Dixon – bass
- Fred Below – drums

== "Surfin' U.S.A." ==
The Beach Boys' 1963 song "Surfin' U.S.A." features lyrics by Brian Wilson and an uncredited Mike Love set to the music of "Sweet Little Sixteen". Under pressure from Berry's publisher, Wilson's father and manager Murry Wilson gave the copyright, including Brian Wilson's lyrics, to Arc Music.

== Beatles-related versions ==
"Sweet Little Sixteen"

Song by The Beatles

from the album Live at the BBC
- Released: November 30, 1994
- Recorded: July 10, 1963
- Genre: Rock and roll
- Length: 2:21
- Label: Apple
- Songwriter: Chuck Berry
- Producer: Terry Henebery

The Beatles recorded the song once for the Pop Go the Beatles radio show on 10 July 1963 at the Aeolian Hall, London. It remained unreleased until Live at the BBC in 1994, a year before the release of the compilation album Anthology 1.

=== Personnel ===
- John Lennon – vocals, rhythm guitar
- George Harrison – lead guitar
- Paul McCartney – bass
- Ringo Starr – drums

Three years after the Beatles broke up, John Lennon recorded a solo version of "Sweet Little Sixteen" for his 1975 album of cover versions, Rock 'n' Roll. His version was produced by Phil Spector, and was recorded between 17 October and 14 December 1973. Spector cut the tempo of the song and gave it the Wall of Sound treatment, and Lennon turned in one of his most passionate vocal performances. While it has a running time of 3:01, it has fewer verses than Berry's original version, being slower and more bluesy than the original. A year later, fellow Beatle Paul McCartney recorded the tune, while making a film during one afternoon in the "backyard" of Abbey Road Studios during the production of One Hand Clapping.
