= Sure to Fall (in Love with You) =

1955 song by Carl Perkins

1957 Sun Dance Album of Carl Perkins, 1225.

Sun EP 115, featuring "Sure to Fall", 1961.

"Sure to Fall (in Love with You)" is a 1955 song written by Carl Perkins, Bill Cantrell, and Quinton Claunch. It was recorded by Carl Perkins in December 1955 and was planned for release as the follow-up to "Blue Suede Shoes". Carl and Jay Perkins were on vocals. The song was not issued, however, as a single on the Sun Records label at that time. A test pressing was made. Sam Phillips circulated dubs or acetates to local radio stations of the proposed single. The Sun catalogue number was 235 backed with Perkins' song "Tennessee" on the B-side. The Sun master numbers assigned to the two sides were U 177 and U 178. Liner notes for the Rhino Records release of Carl Perkins' Original Sun Greatest Hits, however, listed the single as being issued at the time as 235DJ, available to disc jockeys only. The songs were released, however, on the 1957 Sun LP, Dance Album of Carl Perkins, 1225, re-released as Teen Beat; The Best of Carl Perkins in 1961. This album was also released in the UK on London as HA-S 2202, and is how the Beatles heard the songs. The song also appeared on Sun EP 115 released in 1961. Sun Records under Shelby Singleton did release a "Sure to Fall"/"Tennessee" single, Sun Golden Treasure Series, Sun 5, but it was in the late 1970s, when the Carl Perkins 45s were re-released.

== Recordings by the Beatles ==
The Beatles first recorded the song as part of their Decca audition on 1 January 1962 in London. The Beatles thought highly enough of the song to record "live" versions of it four times for the BBC, all broadcast on the group's BBC radio programs. A recording made on 1 June 1963 for the BBC radio series Pop Go the Beatles, appeared on the Beatles' 1994 compilation album Live at the BBC. Their 3 September 1963 BBC recording, appeared on the 2013 compilation album On Air – Live at the BBC Volume 2.

Beatles drummer Ringo Starr later recorded a new version on his 1981 album, Stop and Smell the Roses, featuring producer Paul McCartney on bass and piano, as well as backing vocals from Linda McCartney, Laurence Juber on guitar, Howie Casey on saxophone, and Lloyd Green on pedal steel guitar. The song also appeared on his 1989 greatest hits collection Starr Struck: Best of Ringo Starr, Vol. 2.

== Sources ==
- Perkins, Carl, and McGee, David. Go, Cat, Go!: The Life and Times of Carl Perkins, The King of Rockabilly. Hyperion Press, 1996. ISBN 0-7868-6073-1
- Morrison, Craig. Go Cat Go!: Rockabilly Music and Its Makers. University of Illinois Press, 1998. ISBN 978-0252065385
