= Rex Griffin =

American singer-songwriter (1912–1959)

- Born: Alsie Griffin; August 12, 1912; Gadsden, Alabama, United States
- Died: October 11, 1959 (aged 47)
- Genre: Country
- Instrument: Guitar
- Years active: 1930s – 1950s

Alsie "Rex" Griffin (August 12, 1912 – October 11, 1959) was an American country musician and songwriter.

== Early life ==
Griffin was born in Gadsden, Alabama as the second of seven children to Marion and Selma Griffin. He grew up on a farm and received little schooling, eventually finding work in the factory where his father worked as a teenager. He played harmonica initially, but picked up guitar soon after, playing locally in a style heavily influenced by Jimmie Rodgers.

Griffin started playing professionally in 1930, and shortly thereafter moved to Birmingham, where he joined the Smokey Mountaineers and adopted the name "Rex", since the Mountaineers' announcer found it difficult to pronounce his given name. Throughout the first half of the 1930s he played on radio stations throughout the American South.

== Career ==
Griffin's first recordings followed in 1935 for Decca Records, with Johnny Motlow playing banjo on his first session of ten songs. He recorded alone the following year for Decca, with one of the songs being his own composition, "Everybody's Trying to Be My Baby". These songs were a huge influence on Hank Williams; William's first big hit was a cover of Griffin's "Lovesick Blues".

Griffin found some success in the latter part of the decade, and recorded his biggest hit, "The Last Letter", in 1937. The tune, whose lyrics were a hypothetical suicide note, was popular throughout the South and was covered by Jimmie Davis and others. Gene Sullivan and Bob Crosby also covered Griffin-penned songs in the 1930s.

Griffin recorded for Decca through 1939, after which time he was dropped due to slacking record sales. He rejoined the band Billie Walker and Her Texas Cowboys in 1940, having previously played with them in the middle of the 1930s. He played with his own Melody Boys in Alabama not long after, which featured musicians Vernon "Toby" Reese, Chester Studdard, and Ray "Kemo" Head (the last of whom later played with Ernest Tubb's Texas Troubadours).

In 1941, his mother died, and he moved on to Dallas, working at radio station KRLD until 1943; from there he moved to Chicago. In 1944 he recorded again for Decca on a series of transcription discs, which were never commercially issued by Decca.

Griffin's last recordings followed in 1946 on King Records out of Cincinnati. He sold many of his songs with no credit or recognition and collaborated on many without recognition. One possible collaboration is "I Saw Mommy Kissing Santa Claus". Griffin later returned to Dallas and worked as a songwriter, penning tunes for Ray Price, Ernest Tubb, Eddy Arnold, and Red Foley.

== Personal life ==
Griffin's marriage to Dorothy K. Smith of Columbus, Georgia produced two daughters: Christine, Rexine with five grandchildren and eight great-grandchildren, and six great great grandchildren.

The ill effects of a second divorce, alcoholism, and diabetes took their toll on Griffin, who could not continue active performance after the late 1940s. He contracted tuberculosis in the middle of the 1950s, and died near the end of the decade in New Orleans.

== Legacy ==
By the time of his death he was largely forgotten, due in part to the fact that his hits had come before the era of the LP record and were never reissued to 12" vinyl. Nevertheless, his songs were known to country musicians and were covered by Hank Thompson, Jack Greene, Willie Nelson, Waylon Jennings, and Merle Haggard.

In 1956, Carl Perkins adapted his "Everybody's Trying to Be My Baby" into his own song and in 1964 The Beatles covered it on the album Beatles for Sale. Griffin's "Won't You Ride in My Little Red Wagon?" became Hank Penny's theme song, and has been covered by various artists including Willie Nelson, Hank Thompson, and Merle Travis. In 1963, Ernest Tubb released a tribute album titled Just Call Me Lonesome, consisting entirely of songs written by Griffin. Griffin was inducted into the Nashville Songwriters Hall of Fame in 1970. In 1996, Bear Family Records issued a 3-CD set of Griffin's recordings.
