= I Got to Find My Baby =

1941 song by Doctor Clayton

"Gotta Find My Baby"

Song by Doctor Clayton
- Recorded: 11 November 1941
- Genre: Rock
- Label: Bluebird Records B8901
- Songwriter: Peter Clayton

"I Got to Find My Baby" first recorded titled as "Gotta Find My Baby" is a rock and roll song written and recorded in 1941 by Peter Joe Clayton under the name 'Doctor Clayton'. In the 1950s, cover versions were recorded as "I Got To Find My Baby" by other R&B artists, including B. B. King (1952), Little Walter (1954) and Chuck Berry, who is sometimes miscredited as the song's composer. The song was also recorded by the Beatles in 1963.

== Original version ==
"I Got to Find My Baby"

Song by Chuck Berry
- B-side: "Mad Lad"
- Released: August 1960
- Recorded: 12 February 1960
- Studio: Chess (Chicago)
- Genre: Rock
- Length: 2:13
- Label: Chess Records 1763
- Songwriter: Peter Clayton
- Producers: Leonard Chess, Phil Chess

The blues singer Peter Clayton composed "Gotta Find My Baby" in 1941 and recorded it in Chicago on November 11 for Bluebird Records under the name 'Doctor Clayton'. The song was released on January 9, 1942, as Bluebird B8901 and later included on Doctor Clayton - His Complete Recorded Works (Document CD DOCD 5179).

== Chuck Berry version ==
Chuck Berry recorded the song at Chess Records on February 12, 1960, and it was released in August 1960 as a single under the title "I Got To Find My Baby" with "Mad Lad" as its B-side (Chess 1763), but the single did not chart.

== The Beatles version ==
"I Got to Find My Baby"

Song by the Beatles

from the album Live at the BBC
- Released: 30 November 1994 (UK)
- Recorded: 1 June 1963
- Studio: BBC Paris Studio (London)
- Genre: Rock
- Length: 1:56
- Label: Apple
- Songwriter: Peter Clayton
- Producer: Terry Henebery

The Beatles first recorded their version of the song on June 1, 1963, at the BBC Paris Studio in London for the second Pop Go The Beatles radio show. The group recorded two versions of the song as "I Got to Find My Baby" (credited to Berry). The song was first broadcast on June 11 and was later included on the 1994 album Live at the BBC. Later that month, they performed the song on the Saturday Club program on June 24. The performance was taped at the Playhouse Theatre in London, and was first broadcast five days later.

The Beatles had already performed several songs written by Chuck Berry. John Lennon sang lead vocal and played harmonica, as he did on most of their covers of Berry's songs.

=== Personnel ===
- John Lennon – vocals, harmonica, rhythm guitar
- Paul McCartney – bass
- George Harrison – lead guitar
- Ringo Starr – drums

== Other versions ==
"Gotta Find My Baby" was also recorded in 1954 by bluesman and harmonica player Little Walter for Chess Records, the same record label as Chuck Berry.
