= Soldier of Love (Lay Down Your Arms) =

1962 single by Arthur Alexander

Single by Arthur Alexander
- A-side: "Where Have You Been (All My Life)"
- Released: 1962
- Genre: Soul
- Length: 2:18
- Label: Dot Records
- Songwriters: Buzz Cason, Tony Moon
- Producer: Noel Ball (uncredited)

Arthur Alexander singles chronology
"You Better Move On" (1961)	"Soldier of Love (Lay Down Your Arms)" (1962)	"Anna (Go to Him)" (1962)

"Soldier of Love (Lay Down Your Arms)," also known as "Soldiers of Love," is a 1962 song written by Buzz Cason and Tony Moon. It was originally recorded by soul artist Arthur Alexander and released as a B-side of the single "Where Have You Been (All My Life)", which reached #58 in the Billboard Hot 100 in June 1962. The song was later covered by The Beatles during a 1963 session at the BBC, released on the 1994 album Live at the BBC. It was also covered by The Kaisers, Marshall Crenshaw, Pearl Jam, Little Steven, and The Derailers.

== Background ==
Music critic Dave Marsh suggests that "Soldier of Love (Lay Down Your Arms)" may have been lost to history had the Beatles not heard it and recorded a cover version of it. He writes that the song was mostly forgotten until a bootleg of the Beatles' recording emerged in the late 1970s. Marsh describes Alexander's version of the song as having an "off-center Latin rhythm" and his vocals as having a country and western music sound. Marsh rates it as one of the top 1,001 singles of all time, praising its "inexorable rhythmic flow" and the way the lyrics and music combine to create a "metaphor in which strife among lovers becomes a cry for universal peace." Allmusic critic Richie Unterberger suggests that the mixing of love and martial metaphors is almost overdone, although the song manages to avoid sounding gimmicky. Unterberger attributes this to the song's "fine sad" minor key melody, the "dignity" of Alexander's vocal, the exchanges between Alexander and the backup singers and the "restrained" string instruments.

== The Beatles version ==
"Soldier of Love (Lay Down Your Arms)"

Song by the Beatles

from the album Live at the BBC
- Released: 30 November 1994
- Recorded: 2 July 1963
- Genre: Rhythm and blues
- Length: 1:59
- Label: Apple Records
- Songwriters: Buzz Cason, Tony Moon
- Producer: George Martin

As early as 1962, The Beatles had been playing live versions of the songs on both sides of Alexander's single, with "Where Have You Been (All My Life)" being unofficially recorded at the Star-Club in December that year. They recorded a cover of "Soldier of Love" on July 2, 1963, the day after recording the "She Loves You"/"I'll Get You" single. Unterberger rates the Beatles' performance of the song as "fabulous," calling it probably "the greatest gem" on Live at the BBC. Unterberger enumerates a number of ways in which the Beatles' recording differs from the original, such as the Beatles playing the main riff on guitar, while on Alexander's recording the riff was played on piano. The Beatles also add vocal harmonies, which Unterberger describes as "excellent," and eliminate Alexander's "somber" violins. Unterberger states that the cumulative effect of the differences is to make the Beatles' version "exuberant," compared to Alexander's sad version, claiming that it sounds "as if the Beatles expected to win over the woman as a matter of course, whereas there was a sense of desperate last-hope begging in Alexander's vocal." Critic Robert Christgau calls it one of the Beatles greatest covers. Rolling Stone critic Anthony DeCurtis uses John Lennon's "crooning" on the song as an example of why Lennon was a great rock 'n' roll singer. Author Ian MacDonald describes it as an "ideal vehicle for Lennon," who sings the lead vocal. MacDonald also suggests that three songs from the Beatles 1963 album With the Beatles—"Not a Second Time", "It Won't Be Long" and "All I've Got to Do"—were influenced by "Soldier of Love (Lay Down Your Arms)."

== Marshall Crenshaw version ==
"Soldier of Love (Lay Down Your Arms)"

Song by Marshall Crenshaw

from the album Marshall Crenshaw
- Released: April 28, 1982
- Recorded: January 1982
- Genre: Power pop
- Label: Warner Bros.
- Producers: Richard Gottehrer; Marshall Crenshaw

The song was also covered by Marshall Crenshaw on his 1982 debut album. Crenshaw had been introduced to the song by the Beatles cover and did not hear Alexander's original until he released his own rendition. He explained, "I heard the Beatles doing it first and flipped over their version. When I was with Beatlemania, friends of mine had the Beatles' BBC recordings on bootlegs; that's how I [first] heard the tune. I didn't hear Arthur Alexander's record until after my first album was out already, with my version of 'Soldier Of Love' on it. I think Arthur wins, definitely."

William Ruhlmann of AllMusic wrote, "Any record collector had to love a guy who knew enough to cover Arthur Alexander's 'Soldier of Love.'"

== Other covers ==
Grady Lloyd's 1967 version, with the title "Lay Down Your Arms", was a top 10 hit in some US regions such as central Florida. It was covered by Pearl Jam for the 1999 album, No Boundaries: A Benefit for the Kosovar Refugees, with their version appearing as a B-side to their cover of "Last Kiss". Pearl Jam also played the song live and it has appeared on several of their live albums. Little Steven and his band The Disciples of Soul covered it on their 2021 live album Macca to Mecca! Live at the Cavern Club, Liverpool. The song was also covered by The Derailers on their 2006 album Soldiers Of Love, which was produced by Cason. AllMusic critic Rick Anderson regarded this version as being "fun" and "a sweetly kitschy gem."
