= I Forgot to Remember to Forget =

1955 country song

Single by Elvis Presley
- B-side: "Mystery Train"
- Released: August 20, 1955
- Recorded: July 11, 1955
- Studio: Sun Studio, Memphis
- Genre: Country
- Length: 2:28
- Label: Sun 223
- Songwriters: Charlie Feathers and Stan Kesler
- Producer: Sam Phillips

Elvis Presley singles chronology
"Baby Let's Play House" (1955)	"I Forgot to Remember to Forget" (1955)	"Heartbreak Hotel" (1956)

"I Forgot to Remember to Forget" is a 1955 country song, first recorded by Elvis Presley and written by Stan Kesler and Charlie Feathers. It was Elvis' first No. 1 record nationally. The single was the fifth and final single released on Sun Records before Elvis moved to RCA Records.

== Background ==
The song was recorded at Sun Studio on July 11, 1955, by Elvis Presley, Scotty Moore, Bill Black, and Johnny Bernero on drums, and released on August 20, 1955, along with "Mystery Train" (Sun 223). It was first re-released along with "Mystery Train" by HMV in New Zealand in November 1955, the first appearance of Elvis Presley on 12” vinyl internationally (MCLP 6001). It was re-released by RCA Victor (#47-6357) in December, 1955, after Elvis switched to that label.

Scotty Moore's guitar had a Nashville steel guitar sound, and Bill Black played a clip-clop rhythm. Elvis sang a brooding vocal. This is the closest the trio came to a traditional country song while at Sun.

The song reached the Billboard national country music chart No. 1 position on February 25, 1956, on the Billboard C&W Best Sellers in Stores chart, and remained there at No. 1 for 2 weeks, and spent 5 weeks at No. 1 on the Billboard C&W Most Played in Juke Boxes chart. The record reached No. 4 on the Billboard Most Played by Jockeys chart. It was the first recording to make Elvis Presley a nationally known country music star. The song remained on the country charts for 39 weeks.

The single reached No. 2 on the Cash Box Country singles chart on the March 10, 1956 Top 15 Country Best Sellers Chart.

The flip side of this release, "Mystery Train", peaked at the No. 11 position on the national Billboard Country Chart.

== The Beatles version ==
"I Forgot to Remember to Forget"

Song by The Beatles

from the album Live at the BBC
- Released: 30 November 1994 (UK); 5 December 1994 (US)
- Recorded: 1 May 1964, for the BBC radio show, From Us to You
- Length: 2:09
- Label: Apple
- Songwriter: Kesler-Feathers
- Producer: Terry Henebery

The Beatles covered this song once for the BBC radio show, From Us To You, on 1 May 1964, with George Harrison on lead vocals. The song is notable for being the last time the Beatles performed a song for the BBC that wasn't recorded for EMI. The song is also notable for its double-time rhythmic changes during the bridge. The band was becoming more experimental at the time; after they recorded "I Call Your Name", they used that song's ska-influenced middle section again for "I Forgot to Remember to Forget". The song was not officially released until 1994, when it was included on Live at the BBC.

=== Personnel ===
Personnel per The Beatles Bible.

- George Harrison – vocals, lead guitar
- John Lennon – rhythm guitar
- Paul McCartney – bass
- Ringo Starr – drums

== Other cover versions ==
Jerry Lee Lewis recorded the song in 1957 and the 1960s. Johnny Cash covered and released this song in 1959 on the Sun LP Greatest! and on the album The Survivors Live in 1981. B. J. Thomas included this song on his 1972 album, B. J. Thomas Country. Chuck Jackson, Ral Donner, Robert Gordon, Johnny Hallyday, The Deighton Family, Hicksville Bombers, and Wanda Jackson recorded this song as well. Chris Isaak also covered this song on his 2011 album, Beyond the Sun. Bob Dylan and The Band recorded this song in 1967; it was released on the 2014 album, The Bootleg Series Vol. 11: The Basement Tapes Complete. Composer Charlie Feathers has also recorded the song.
