= Where Have You Been (All My Life) =

1962 single by Arthur Alexander

Single by Arthur Alexander
- B-side: "Soldier of Love (Lay Down Your Arms)"
- Released: 1962
- Genre: Soul
- Length: 2:43
- Label: Dot Records
- Songwriters: Barry Mann and Cynthia Weil
- Producer: Noel Ball (uncredited)

Arthur Alexander singles chronology
"You Better Move On" (1961)	"Where Have You Been (All My Life)" (1962)	"Anna (Go to Him)" (1962)

"Where Have You Been (All My Life)" is a song written by Barry Mann and Cynthia Weil.

== Arthur Alexander version ==
"Where Have You Been (All My Life)" was first released by Arthur Alexander in 1962, with "Soldier of Love (Lay Down Your Arms)" as the B-side, on Dot Records (London Records in the UK). Alexander biographer Richard Younger describes the song as "a classic example of sixties pop songwriting that captures the thrill of first love." Billboard Magazine described the song as "an emotion-packed theme with solid female chorus work," and also praised the feeling Alexander imbues his vocal with. Younger praises the "maturity" of Alexander's vocal performance, comparing it favorably to that on the earlier "You Better Move On," particularly how Alexander handles the "intricate melody, which ascends from the opening lines of revelation...to a chorus that is half-plea and half-exclamation." Producer Noel Ball claimed to have taken Alexander "way uptown" with the recording, creating what Younger describes as "a thrilling production that builds from a stark bass and drum into a mini-symphony with strings reminiscent of The Drifters' "There Goes My Baby." The song peaked at #58 on the Billboard Hot 100, and #17 on the R&B chart. Authors David Hatch and Stephen Millward see a resemblance between "Where Have You Been (All My Life)" and early songs written by John Lennon and Paul McCartney.

== Covers ==
The Beatles covered both "Where Have You Been (All My Life)" and "Soldier of Love" live early in their career. There is a live version by the Beatles on the bootleg album Live 31 December 1962 at the Star Club, Hamburg, Germany with John Lennon on lead vocal. Music critic Richie Unterberger described the song as "cool" and "moody" but complained that the sound on this recording was too "muddy" to be able to figure out the lyrics.

The song was recorded by Gene Vincent on Columbia Records, and by Gerry and the Pacemakers on Laurie. Also the Liverpool-based group The Searchers recorded the song on Pye Records for their 1964 LP It's The Searchers. Wayne Fontana & The Mindbenders also recorded it, appearing in B side of their 1964 eponymous album.

This song with the title Till We Kissed, was sung by the New Zealander Ray Columbus & the Invaders in a 1965 single of the same name. The Canadian band The Guess Who issued the song with this title as the "B" side of their single Shakin' All Over in 1965.

Roy Clark released a song with the same title, but written by Wayland Holyfield, in his 1978 album : Labor of Love.
