= Marijohn Wilkin =

American songwriter (1920–2006)

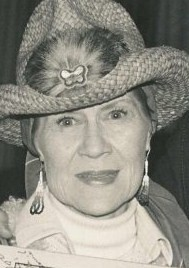
- Wilkin in 1977

Background information
- Born: July 14, 1920; Kemp, Texas, United States
- Origin: Nashville, Tennessee, U.S.
- Died: October 28, 2006 (aged 86) Nashville, Tennessee, U.S.
- Genres: Gospel music; country; Christian music
- Occupation: Songwriter
- Instrument: Guitar
- Years active: 1958 – 2006
- Label: Jordan Records

Marijohn Wilkin (née Melson, formerly Russell, later Selman; July 14, 1920 – October 28, 2006) was an American songwriter, famous in country music for writing a number of hits such as "One Day At a Time" and "The Long Black Veil". Wilkin won numerous awards over the years and was referred to as "The Den Mother of Music Row," as chronicled in her 1978 biography Lord, Let Me Leave a Song (authored with Darryl E. Hicks). It was honored as “One of the 100 Most Important Books about Nashville’s Music Industry.”

== Biography ==
Wilkin was born in Kemp, Texas, to Ernest and Karla Melson and raised in Sanger, north of Dallas. She became a teacher, and was widowed when her husband Bedford Russell was killed in World War II. She remarried in 1946, with one son; her 1950 marriage to Art Wilkin, Jr. was her third.

Her father, a baker, had been a fiddle player. From 1955 she toured with Red Foley, and in 1956 her songs were recorded by Mitchell Torok and Wanda Jackson. In 1958, she moved to Nashville, Tennessee, and had major hits, written with John D. Loudermilk, for Stonewall Jackson (the number one country hit "Waterloo", which made the pop top ten) and Jimmy C. Newman.

Wilkin also wrote "The Long Black Veil" for Lefty Frizzell (with Danny Dill), "Cut Across Shorty" for Eddie Cochran (with Wayne P. Walker), and "I Just Don't Understand" which became a pop hit for Ann-Margret and was covered by The Beatles. Although she was primarily a country songwriter, her songs have been recorded by several pop and rock acts, including Rod Stewart and Mick Jagger. Wilkin also recorded occasionally for Columbia Records and Dot Records in the 1960s and at times worked as a background vocalist. She is billed simply as Marijohn on a few of her recordings. On DOT records, she recorded under the name Romi Spain.

Marijohn Wilkin may be most famous for "One Day at a Time", often considered the biggest gospel song of the 1970s. Wilkin wrote the song in 1973 with some assistance by her former protégé Kris Kristofferson. The song won a Dove Award from the Gospel Music Association in 1975 (see also: Dove Award for Song of the Year). The song was a top 20 country single for Marilyn Sellars in 1974 and hit No. 37 on Billboard's Hot 100 pop chart. It also launched a career as a gospel recording artist for Wilkin, who released several albums on Word Records. A remake became a No. 1 country hit for Cristy Lane in 1980 and has since been recorded more than 200 times. Even though written as a personal worship song, it has also been recognized as "One of the Top 50 Southern Gospel Songs."

Johnny Duncan and Ed Bruce were among the many songwriters she helped get a foothold in the music business. Kris Kristofferson was in the army with one of her cousins, so he sent some of his work to her at Buckhorn, her publishing company. She became the first to publish his songs, notably "For the Good Times". In 1970, it became a massive pop and country hit for Ray Price.

Wilkin's son, John "Bucky" Wilkin, became the frontman of the 1960s surf rock group Ronny & the Daytonas, whose 1964 debut single "G.T.O." reached No. 4 on the Billboard Pop Singles chart.

In 1975, she was inducted into the Nashville Songwriters Hall of Fame.

Wilkin formed 17th Avenue Music, a publishing company. It became profitable when its songs were recorded by LeAnn Rimes. In 2005, Wilkin was honored by the SOURCE organization as a pioneering Music Row businesswoman. This was her last notable public appearance. She died of heart disease in 2006, aged 86. Her last marriage was to record producer Clarence Selman in 1967.

== Discography ==
- Ballads of the Blue and Gray (Columbia, 1962)
- Country and Western Songs (Columbia Harmony, c. 1963)
- I Have Returned (Word, 1974)
- I Thought of God
- Isn't it Wonderful (Word, 1975)
- Where I'm Going (Word, 1975)
- Reach Up and Touch God's Hand (Word, 1976)
- Higher Than High (Word, 1977)
- Lord, Leave Me a Song (Word, 1978)
- One Day at a Time (Word, 1980)
- A Little Bit of Jesus (Word, 1981)
- His Kind of Love (Buckhorn Music Publishers, UNK date)

== Other sources ==
- Cooper, Daniel (1998). "Marijohn Wilkin". In The Encyclopedia of Country Music. Paul Kingsbury, Editor. New York: Oxford University Press. p. 587.
- Interview with Marijohn Wilkin in the International Songwriters Association's "Songwriter Magazine", dealing mainly with her songwriting : 1983
- Obituary in The Independent, October 30 2006
