= Don't Ever Change (song) =

Song written by Goffin & King

"Don't Ever Change" is a 1961 popular song written by Gerry Goffin and Carole King. Intended for The Everly Brothers but rejected by their management, a version by The Crickets reached the top 5 in the United Kingdom (Jerry Naylor lead vocal) in 1962.

== The Beatles version ==
"Don't Ever Change"

Song by The Beatles

from the album Live at the BBC
- Released: 30 November 1994 (UK); 5 December 1994 (US)
- Recorded: 1 August 1963
- Studio: Playhouse Theatre, Manchester
- Genre: Pop
- Length: 2:03
- Label: Apple
- Songwriter: Goffin-King
- Producer: Terry Henebery

The Beatles performed the song on their BBC radio show Pop Go the Beatles, which was later released on their 1994 compilation Live at the BBC. It was taped on 1 August 1963, had its first broadcast on 27 August 1963, was produced by Terry Henebery and was a rare harmony duet between Paul McCartney and George Harrison.

=== The Beatles personnel ===
- Paul McCartney – vocals, bass
- George Harrison – vocals, lead guitar
- John Lennon – rhythm guitar
- Ringo Starr – drums

Personnel per The Beatles Bible.

== Other covers ==
The song was also covered by Brinsley Schwarz on their Please Don't Ever Change album in 1973, by Bryan Ferry on his 1973 album These Foolish Things, and by Mud on their 1982 album Mud featuring Les Gray.
