= Lend Me Your Comb =

Song written by Kay Twomey, Ben Weisman, Fred Wise

A picture of "Sun 287: The Rockin' Guitar Man" in 45 format.

"Lend Me Your Comb" is a 1957 song written by Kay Twomey, Fred Wise and Ben Weisman. The song was first released by singer Carol Hughes as the A-Side of her Roulette Records single R-4041, which was reviewed by Billboard magazine in their December 30, 1957, issue.

== See also ==
- Carl Perkins
- 1957 in music
- 1963 in music
- Rockabilly
- Rock'n'Roll

== Sources ==
- Perkins, Carl, and David McGee. Go, Cat, Go!: The Life and Times of Carl Perkins, The King of Rockabilly. Hyperion Press, 1996. ISBN 0-7868-6073-1
- Morrison, Craig. Go Cat Go!: Rockabilly Music and Its Makers. University of Illinois Press, 1998.
