= MPL Communications =

Holding company owned by Paul McCartney

- Logo since 1982
- Type: Music publishing activities
- Founded: 30 December 1968; 57 years ago
- Founder: Paul McCartney
- Headquarters: London, England; New York City, United States
- Website: mplcommunications.com

MPL Communications (which stands for McCartney Productions Ltd.) (NAICS 512230, SIC 2741) is the umbrella company for the business interests of Paul McCartney and was established in 1969. In addition to handling McCartney's post-Beatles work, MPL is one of the world's largest privately owned music publishers through its acquisition of other publishing companies.

== Profile ==
The company was founded in February 1969 as Adagrose Limited but changed its name to McCartney Productions Ltd. in August 1969. One of the company's first projects was the purchase of the rights to a film adaptation of Rupert Bear in early 1970.

== Music publishing ==
MPL publishing owns a wide range of copyrighted material – covering over 100 years of music – by composers including McCartney, Buddy Holly, Carl Perkins, Jerry Herman, Frank Loesser, Meredith Willson, Harold Arlen and many others, with songs, such as "Rock-a-Bye Your Baby with a Dixie Melody" (made famous by Al Jolson in 1918), "I'm Glad There Is You", "Blue Suede Shoes", and "That'll Be the Day". MPL also publishes some early 1960s songs written by Bob Gaudio, including the US #1 hits "Sherry", "Big Girls Don't Cry" and "Walk Like a Man", all recorded by The Four Seasons.

Lennon–McCartney songs such as "Love Me Do" and "P.S. I Love You" became part of the catalog in the late 2010s after McCartney reached a settlement with longtime Beatles catalog holder Sony/ATV Music Publishing allowing the co-author to reclaim his songs fifty-six years from their initial publication. McCartney filed more claims for the return of his share US publishing rights of Lennon/MCartney songs from Sony/ATV. These rights were acquired commencing from 2018, with the last being acquired in May 2026. MPL also controls 25 subsidiary companies.

In 1976 MPL bought the North American rights to the Edwin H. Morris & Co. catalogue from Morris himself, and most of Buddy Holly's compositions, and in 2003 the rights to Carl Perkins' works. The Holly acquisition was followed by McCartney's launch of 'Buddy Holly Day' with a concert presented annually from 1976 to 1999. Additionally, MPL has acquired rights to other cover songs recorded by the Beatles, and solo recordings by John Lennon, McCartney, Ringo Starr, and Denny Laine as follows:

=== Buddy Holly songs ===
- "Words of Love" (Beatles for Sale, 1964)
- "Crying, Waiting, Hoping" (Live at the BBC, 1994)
- "That'll Be the Day" (Anthology 1, 1995)
- "Peggy Sue" (Lennon's Rock 'n' Roll, 1975, John Lennon Anthology, 1998, Instant Karma, 2002, and Gimme Some Truth box set, 2010)
- "Heartbeat" (Lennon's Power to the People, Deluxe box set, 2025)
- "Maybe Baby" (Lennon's Power to the People, Deluxe box set, 2025)
- "Rave On!" (Lennon's Power to the People, Deluxe box set, 2025)
- Denny Laine's album Holly Days (1976)

=== Carl Perkins songs ===
- "Everybody's Trying to Be My Baby", (Beatles for Sale, 1964, and Live at the Hollywood Bowl, 2016)
- "Honey Don't" (Beatles for Sale, 1964)
- "Matchbox" (Long Tall Sally EP, 1964 and Past Masters, 1988)
- "Sure to Fall" (Live at the BBC, 1994, and Starr's Stop and Smell the Roses, 1981)
- "Blue Suede Shoes" (Anthology 3, 1996, The Beatles: Get Back, 2021, Lennon's Live Peace in Toronto, 1969, Lennon box set, 1990, and Instant Karma, 2002)
- "That's Right" (Lennon's Power to the People Deluxe box set, 2025)

=== Other songs ===
- "Twist and Shout" (Please Please Me, 1963, The Beatles at the Hollywood Bowl, 1977, Anthology 1, 1995, The Beatles: Get Back, 2021)
- "Till There Was You" (With the Beatles, 1963, Live at the BBC, 1994, Anthology 1, 1995)
- "Your Feet's Too Big" (Live! at the Star-Club in Hamburg, Germany; 1962, 1977)
- "Reminiscing" (Live! at the Star-Club in Hamburg, Germany; 1962, 1977)
- "Ain't She Sweet" (Anthology 1, 1995, Anthology 3, 1996, John Lennon Anthology, 1998)
- "Hi-Heel Sneakers" (The Beatles: Get Back, 2021, McCartney's Unplugged (The Official Bootleg), Lennon's Power to the People Deluxe box set, 2025)
- "Carolina Moon" (The Beatles: Get Back, 2021)
- "Bluejean Bop" (McCartney's Run Devil Run, 1999)
- "Let's Have a Party" aka "Party" (McCartney's Run Devil Run, 1999)
- "I'm Gonna Sit Right Down and Write Myself a Letter" (McCartney's Kisses on the Bottom, 2012)
- "More I Cannot Wish You" (McCartney's Kisses on the Bottom, 2012)
- "Ac-Cent-Tchu-Ate the Positive" (McCartney's Kisses on the Bottom, 2012)
- "The Inch Worm" (McCartney's Kisses on the Bottom, 2012)
- "Sentimental Journey" (Starr's Sentimental Journey, 1970)
- "Blue, Turning Grey Over You" (Starr's Sentimental Journey, 1970)
- "Blue Christmas" (Starr's I Wanna Be Santa Claus, 1999)

== Trademark ==
In October 2006, the Trademark Registry in London reported that MPL Communications had started a process to trademark McCartney's name on saleable goods.

== See also ==
- Category:Music published by MPL Music Publishing
- Calderstone Productions
