= Blue Suede Shoes: A Rockabilly Session =

Live album by Carl Perkins
- Released: 1 January 1986
- Recorded: 21 October 1985
- Venues: Limehouse Studios, London
- Genres: Rockabilly, rock and roll
- Labels: Snapper Music, HBO/Cinemax
- Producers: Graham Nolder, Carl Perkins

Carl Perkins chronology
Original Sun Greatest Hits (1986)	Blue Suede Shoes: A Rockabilly Session (1986)	Up Through The Years 1954-57 (1986)

Blue Suede Shoes: A Rockabilly Session was a televised concert that was taped live at Limehouse Studios in London, England on 21 October 1985. The show featured rock n' roll pioneer Carl Perkins along with friends as guest stars, including former Beatles George Harrison and Ringo Starr, Eric Clapton, Rosanne Cash, Phantom, Rocker & Slick, and Dave Edmunds (who also served as the concert's musical director). Most of the repertoire performed in the concert consisted of Perkins' classic rockabilly songs from the 1950s.

The concert special was directed by Tom Gutteridge and originally broadcast Channel 4 in the UK on 1 January 1986, and on Cinemax in the US in 1986, with introductory comments from Perkins' friends, contemporaries, and occasional collaborators Johnny Cash, Roy Orbison, and Jerry Lee Lewis.

Perkins performed 16 songs with two encores. Perkins and his friends ended the session by singing his most famous song, 30 years after its writing, which brought Perkins to tears. The concert is a memorable highlight of Carl Perkins' later career and has been highly praised by fans for the spirited performances delivered by Perkins and his famous guests. It was the first public performance by George Harrison in more than ten years.

== Background and production ==
Perkins started his recording career on Sam Phillips' Sun Records in Memphis in 1955; Sun had also served as the first record label for some of Perkins' contemporaries, friends, and occasional collaborators, including Elvis Presley, Cash, Orbison, and Lewis. Perkins first toured the UK in 1964, on a bill that also included The Nashville Teens and Elkie Brooks. After this initial tour, he continued performing regularly in the UK and elsewhere in Europe into the 1970s, 1980s, and 1990s. Cash and Perkins also regularly appeared at Wembley Stadium in London during country music festivals in the early 1970s. In 1978, during the rockabilly and early rock and roll revival, Perkins released the album Ol' Blue Suede's Back, which was his only album to chart in the UK.

Graham Nolder, a music publisher, had worked with Perkins in the early 1980s and developed the idea of Perkins performing "alongside an all-star band of friends". Perkins agreed to a concert, television special, and live album in 1984, but the busy schedules of the friends and collaborators that participated in the concert forced it to be delayed for about 18 months. The concert was finally scheduled to take place after Perkins finished recording the album Class of '55: Memphis Rock & Roll Homecoming, a collaboration with Cash, Orbison, and Lewis. According to Perkins, the concert was recorded 30 years to the month after having written "Blue Suede Shoes".

== Track listing ==
All songs written by Carl Perkins, except where noted. Most writing credits are from the liner notes from the 2005 reissue.

1. "Boppin' the Blues" (Carl Perkins, Howard Griffin)
2. "Put Your Cat Clothes On"
3. "Honey Don't" (with Ringo Starr)
4. "Matchbox" (with Ringo Starr and Eric Clapton)
5. "Mean Woman Blues" (with Eric Clapton) (Claude Demetrius)
6. "Turn Around"
7. "Jackson" (with Rosanne Cash) (Billy Edd Wheeler, Jerry Leiber)
8. "What Kind of Girl" (with Rosanne Cash) (Steve Forbert)
9. "Everybody's Trying to Be My Baby" (with George Harrison) (Carl Perkins, Rex Griffin)
10. "Your True Love" (with George Harrison and Dave Edmunds)
11. "The World is Waiting for the Sunrise" (Ernest Seitz, Gene Lockhart)
12. "Medley": That's Alright Mama (Arthur Crudup) / Blue Moon of Kentucky (Bill Monroe) / Night Train to Memphis (Marvin Hughes, Beasley Smith, Owen Bradley) / Amen (Traditional) (with Ringo Starr, Eric Clapton, Rosanne Cash, George Harrison, and Dave Edmunds)
13. "Glad All Over" (with Ringo Starr, Eric Clapton, Rosanne Cash, George Harrison, and Dave Edmunds) (Roy Bennett, Sid Tepper, Aaron Schroeder)
14. "Whole Lotta Shakin' Goin' On" (with Ringo Starr, Eric Clapton, Rosanne Cash, George Harrison, and Dave Edmunds) (Dave Williams, Roy Hall)
15. "Gone Gone Gone" (with Ringo Starr, Eric Clapton, Rosanne Cash, George Harrison, and Dave Edmunds)
16. "Blue Suede Shoes" (with Ringo Starr, Eric Clapton, Rosanne Cash, George Harrison, and Dave Edmunds)
17. "Blue Suede Shoes" (encore) (with Ringo Starr, Eric Clapton, Rosanne Cash, George Harrison, and Dave Edmunds)
18. "Gone Gone Gone" (encore) (with Ringo Starr, Eric Clapton, Rosanne Cash, George Harrison, and Dave Edmunds)

== Personnel ==
Credits from the liner notes for the 2005 reissue.

- Carl Perkins – vocals, lead and rhythm guitars
- George Harrison – vocals, rhythm and lead guitars
- Ringo Starr – vocals, drums, tambourine
- Eric Clapton – vocals, rhythm and lead guitars
- Dave Edmunds – vocals, guitar, musical director
- Rosanne Cash – vocals, maracas
- Mickey Gee – guitar
- Greg Perkins – bass
- John David – bass
- Geraint Watkins – piano
- Dave Charles – drums

Phantom, Rocker & Slick

- Slim Jim Phantom – drums
- Lee Rocker – double bass
- Earl Slick – guitar

Production staff

- Carl Perkins – producer
- Graham Nolder – producer
