= Go Cat Go! =

Studio album by Carl Perkins
- Released: 1996
- Genre: Rock and roll
- Label: WCMC/ArtistONe
- Producer: Bob Johnston

Carl Perkins chronology
Carl Perkins & Sons (1993)	Go Cat Go! (1996)	Silver Eagle Live (1997)

Go Cat Go! is an album by the American musician Carl Perkins, released in 1996. For most of the songs, Perkins performs with other artists. The album includes recordings from all four ex-Beatles, with Paul McCartney, George Harrison and Ringo Starr recording new material, while John Lennon's version of "Blue Suede Shoes" comes from his album Live Peace in Toronto 1969. Jimi Hendrix's version of the same song is also an archive recording.

The album was produced by Bob Johnston. Also performing with Perkins on the album are Tom Petty & the Heartbreakers, Johnny Cash, Willie Nelson, Bono, Paul Simon, and John Fogerty.

== Critical reception ==
Professional ratings
Review scores
Source	Rating
AllMusic	2.5/5 stars

AllMusic wrote that Perkins sings and plays "in a most masterful and rockin' way."

== Track listing ==
Writing, performance, and song duration credits from AllMusic. All tracks written by Carl Perkins, except where noted.

No.	Title	Writer(s)	Length
1.	"All Mama's Children"	Johnny Cash, Perkins	2:15
2.	"One More Shot"		2:49
3.	"Rockabilly Music"	Perkins, Paul Simon	3:21
4.	"Distance Makes No Difference With Love"		4:12
5.	"Give Me Back My Job"	Jim Garland	4:04
6.	"Blue Suede Shoes" (performed by Jimi Hendrix)		4:03
7.	"Quarter Horse"		2:24
8.	"Don't Stop the Music"		3:13
9.	"Matchbox"		2:19
10.	"Go Cat Go"		3:00
11.	"Two Old Army Pals"		2:50
12.	"Honey Don't"		2:43
13.	"Wild Texas Wind"		4:16
14.	"Restless"		4:25
15.	"A Mile Out of Memphis"	Rob Crosby, Dottie Moore, Perkins	3:05
16.	"My Old Friend"		3:21
17.	"Blue Suede Shoes" (performed by John Lennon & The Plastic Ono Band; originally released on Live Peace in Toronto 1969)		2:24

== Personnel ==
Partial credits. Credits for John Lennon's contribution from the liner notes for Live Peace in Toronto 1969.

New recordings

- Carl Perkins – vocals, guitar
- Paul McCartney – vocals, guitar, bass, piano, drums (all on "My Old Friend")
- George Harrison – acoustic and slide guitar, piano, synthesizer, bass, backing vocals
- Ringo Starr
- Johnny Cash
- Willie Nelson
- Bono
- Paul Simon
- John Fogerty
- Clarence Clemons
- Charlie Daniels
- Rick Danko
- Sheila E.
- Dr. John
- Jesse Johnson
- Jim Keltner
- Billy Preston
- Joe Walsh
- Tom Petty & the Heartbreakers

John Lennon & The Plastic Ono Band's contribution (1969 live version of "Blue Suede Shoes" only)

- John Lennon – lead vocals, rhythm guitar
- Yoko Ono – wind, presence, backing vocals, art
- Eric Clapton – lead guitar; backing vocals
- Klaus Voormann – bass
- Alan White – drums
- Kim Fowley – spoken introduction

Jimi Hendrix's contribution (version of "Blue Suede Shoes" only)

- Jimi Hendrix – lead vocals, lead guitar
- Billy Cox – bass
- Buddy Miles – drums, backing vocals

Production

- Bob Johnston – producer
- Paul McCartney – producer ("My Old Friend")
- George Harrison – ("Distance Makes No Difference with Love")
- George Martin – producer and string arrangements ("My Old Friend")
- John Lennon, Yoko Ono – uncredited producers (Lennon version of "Blue Suede Shoes")
- Geoff Emerick – engineer and mixing ("My Old Friend")
- Jon Kelley – engineer (string overdubs on "My Old Friend")
- Mike Stavrou – engineer ("My Old Friend")
- Eddie Klein, Keith Smith – mixing ("My Old Friend")
