= Boppin' the Blues =

Single by Carl Perkins

from the album Dance Album of Carl Perkins
- B-side: "All Mama's Children"
- Released: May 1956
- Recorded: 1956
- Studio: Sun Studio (Memphis)
- Genre: Rockabilly
- Label: Sun
- Songwriter: Carl Perkins
- Producer: Sam Phillips

Carl Perkins singles chronology
| "Blue Suede Shoes" b/w "Honey Don't" (1956) | "Boppin' the Blues" (1956) | "Dixie Fried" (1956) |

"Boppin' the Blues" is a 1956 song written by Carl Perkins and Howard "Curley" Griffin and released as a single on Sun Records in May 1956. The single was released as a 45 and 78, Sun 243, backed with "All Mama's Children", a song co-written by Perkins with Sun labelmate Johnny Cash.

The song was featured on the 1970 album Carl Perkins' Greatest Hits, Columbia LP CS 9833 and the 1986 Rhino Records collection Carl Perkins: Original Sun Greatest Hits, RNCD 75890. Perkins also performed the song on the Town Hall Party syndicated TV series in 1959 and with Dave Edmunds and the Stray Cats on the 1985 HBO/Cinemax special Blue Suede Shoes: A Rockabilly Session. The record was reissued in 1984 on the Collectables label on the Back to Back Hit Series featuring Sun Records as 3090 and on the Sun Golden Treasure Series in 1979 as Sun 9.

== Background ==
Griffin was a singer and disc jockey from Jackson, Tennessee, who also recorded rock and roll songs on the Atomic Records label from 1955 to 1957, such as "Got Rockin' on My Mind", Atomic 305, released in 1957. Griffin also co-wrote "Dixie Fried" with Perkins in 1956.

== Chart performance ==
The single reached number 9 on the Billboard country and western chart, number 47 on the Cashbox pop singles chart, and number 70 on the Billboard Top 100 pop singles chart. The single was also released in Canada on the Quality label as #1570.

| Chart (1956) | Peak position |
|---|---|
| US Billboard Top 100 | 70 |
| US Billboard C&W Best Sellers | 9 |
| US Cashbox Pop Singles | 47 |

== Notable recordings ==
The song has been recorded by other musicians, including: Ricky Nelson, Gene Vincent, Brian Setzer, and Johnny Rivers.

The band Blackfeather had a no. 1 hit for two weeks on the Australian singles chart in October 1972 with "Boppin' the Blues", a recording that has little in common with the original apart from the title and a similar feel, although Perkins and Griffin are still credited as writers.

== Popular culture ==
- Rick Nelson performed the song on the Ozzie and Harriet TV show on ABC in 1957, along with "Your True Love", another Carl Perkins hit on Sun Records.

== Sources ==
- Perkins, Carl, and McGee, David. Go, Cat, Go!: The Life and Times of Carl Perkins, The King of Rockabilly. Hyperion Press, 1996. ISBN 0-7868-6073-1
- Morrison, Craig. Go Cat Go!: Rockabilly Music and Its Makers. University of Illinois Press, 1998.
- The Carl Perkins Sun Collection.
- Guterman, Jimmy. (1998.) "Carl Perkins." In The Encyclopedia of Country Music. Paul Kingsbury, Ed. New York: Oxford University Press. pp. 412–413.
- Naylor, Jerry; Halliday, Steve. The Rockabilly Legends: They Called It Rockabilly Long Before They Called It Rock and Roll. Milwaukee, Wisc.: Hal Leonard. ISBN 978-1-4234-2042-2. OCLC 71812792.
