= One for the Money =

Nursery rhyme

"One for the Money" is an English-language children's rhyme. Children have used it as early as the 1820s to count before starting a race or other activity.

The full rhyme reads as:

One for the money,
Two for the show;
Three to make ready,
And four to go.

== In popular music ==
The rhyme has been used or interpolated in popular music since the 1950s. The earliest known song to contain the rhyme's lyrics is "Rock Around the Clock" by Hal Singer in 1950. Other early examples are in the intros of "Whatcha Gonna Do" by Bill Haley & His Comets from 1953 and "Roll Hot Rod Roll" by Oscar McLollie and "Blue Suede Shoes" by Carl Perkins, both from 1955. The latter was further popularized in a version by Elvis Presley released in March 1956 on his eponymous debut album. Since then, many other artists have interpolated the rhyme's lyrics in their songs, mainly in hip hop music, notably "Memory Lane (Sittin' in da Park)" by Nas, "My 1st Single" by Eminem, "Spoonin' Rap" by Spoonie Gee, "Jussummen" by Das EFX, "Bomdigi" by Erick Sermon, "Elevators (Me & You)" by Outkast, "Anything Goes" by Ras Kass, "Go to Church" by Ice Cube, "All Outta Ale" by MF Doom, "Boyfriend/Girlfriend" by Tyler, the Creator, "Pelotuda" by Argentinian rapper Dillom and "Give It to Me" by South Korean rapper Agust D.

In pop music, the lyric appears in Taylor Swift's "Champagne Problems", Lana Del Rey's "Million Dollar Man", Everything Everything's "The House Is Dust" and Marianas Trench's "Stutter".

In rock music, it appears in "Sure Feels Good to Me" by Warrant, "Let the Music Do the Talking" by Aerosmith and "Piece of Me" by Skid Row. The phrase was also used as the title and in the main hook, with altered lyrics, for the song "One for the Money" by American rock band Escape the Fate.
