= Instant Karma =

Instant Karma may refer to:

== Music ==
- "Instant Karma!", a 1970 song by John Lennon
- Instant Karma: All-Time Greatest Hits, a 2002 album by John Lennon
- Instant Karma: The Amnesty International Campaign to Save Darfur, a 2007 benefit album
- Instant Karma (band), a 1996–2006 Indian dance music group
- Instant Karma (record label), a British record label

== Film and television ==
- Instant Karma (film), a 1990 American romantic drama
- "Instant Karma!" (Dawson's Creek), a 2002 television episode
- "Instant Karma" (House), a 2009 television episode

== See also ==
- Karma
