= Ricky (album) =

Studio album by Ricky Nelson
- Released: November 1957
- Genre: Rock and roll; rockabilly
- Length: 31:16
- Label: Imperial
- Producer: Charles "Bud" Dant

Ricky Nelson chronology
Ricky (1957)	Ricky Nelson (1958)

Singles from Ricky
- 1. "Be-Bop Baby" Released: September 16, 1957; 2. "If You Can't Rock Me" Released: April 1963

Professional ratings
Review scores
Source	Rating
AllMusic	3/5 stars
The Encyclopedia of Popular Music	2/5 stars

Ricky is the debut studio album by American actor and rock and roll musician Ricky Nelson, released in November 1957 by Imperial Records. it features a mix of rock and roll songs, including covers of Carl Perkins, Cole Porter, and Jerry Lee Lewis. Joe Maphis was the lead guitarist on this album.

The album made its first appearance on the Billboard Best Selling Pop LPs chart in the issue dated November 11, 1957, and remained on the album chart for 33 weeks, spending two consecutive weeks at number one, Nelson becoming the first solo artist under the age of 18 to chart an album. It also debuted on the Cashbox albums chart in the issue dated November 16, 1957, and remained on the chart for a total of 25 weeks, also spending 2 consecutive weeks at number 1. Two singles were released from the album: "Have I Told You Lately That I Love You?" and "Be-Bop Baby". They peaked at No. 29 and No. 5, respectively, on the Billboard Hot 100 singles chart, and 21 and 6 on the Cashbox Singles Chart. A third single from the album, "If You Can't Rock Me", was issued as a single 6 years later to coincide with the release of the 1963 Imperial compilation It's Up To You. It entered the Hot 100, spent a week on the Hot 100 chart in the issue dated April 20, 1963, and peaked at number 100.

The album was released on compact disc by Capitol Records on June 19, 2001, as tracks 1 through 12 on a pairing of two albums on one CD with tracks 16 through 27 consisting of Nelson's 1958 album Ricky Nelson. Bear Family included also the album in the 2001 The American Dream box set. Ricky was included in a box set entitled Four Classic Albums Plus Box Set, which contains all 4 of his studio albums, and was released on July 1, 2016.

== Reception ==
A review by AllMusic describes the album as "derivative" but that Nelson sings "rhythmically in his smooth voice, negotiating the rock & roll beat with far greater ease than Pat Boone" and that he "display[s] the combination of natural pop instincts and genuine rock & roll feel that set him apart from the burgeoning pack of Elvis Presley imitators"

Jackie Moore of Disc mentions "Nelson only really comes to life on the older numbers like 'I'm Confessin'' and 'Am I Blue'."

== Track listing ==
1. "Honeycomb" (Bob Merrill) 2:54
2. "Boppin' the Blues" (Carl Perkins, Howard Griffin) 1:56
3. "Be-Bop Baby" (Pearl Lendhurst) 2:00
4. "Have I Told You Lately that I Love You?" (Scotty Wiseman) 1:58
5. "Teenage Doll" (George Lendhurst, Pearl Lendhurst) 1:40
6. "If You Can't Rock Me" (Willie Jacobs) 1:53
7. "Whole Lotta Shakin' Goin On" (Sunny David, Dave Williams) 2:11
8. "Baby I'm Sorry" (Kenneth Scott) 2:21
9. "Am I Blue?" (Harry Akst, Grant Clarke) 1:39
10. "Confessin'" (Doc Daugherty, Al Neiburg, Ellis Reynolds) 2:16
11. "Your True Love" (Carl Perkins) 1:58
12. "True Love" (Cole Porter) 2:17

== Charts ==
Chart (1958)	Peak position
US Billboard Best Selling Pop LPs	1
US Cashbox Albums	1

=== Singles ===
Year	Title	U.S. Hot 100	U.S. Cashbox
1957	"Have I Told You Lately That I Love You?"	29	21
1957	"Be-Bop Baby"	5	6
1963	"If You Can't Rock Me"	100	—
