= Born to Rock =

Born to Rock may refer to:

- Born to Rock (novel), a 2006 novel by Gordon Korman
- Born to Rock (album), a 1989 album by Carl Perkins
- Born to Rock, a 2005 album by the Dangerfields
- "Born to Rock", a 2008 song by Brant Bjork from the album Punk Rock Guilt
- Born to Rock, a 2024 song by Zedd TheGypsy
