= That's Right =

That's Right may refer to:

== Albums ==
- That's Right (album), an album by George Benson
- That's Right!, an album by Nat Adderley
- That's Right!, an album by Benny Green
- That's Right!, an album by Victor Bailey

== Songs ==
- "That's Right" (Carl Perkins song)
- "That's Right" (Ciara song)
- "That's Right" (Three 6 Mafia song)
- "That's Right (You're Not from Texas)", a song by Lyle Lovett
- "That's Right", a song by Big Kuntry King from My Turn to Eat
- "That's Right", a song by Kelly Clarkson from Chemistry
