= Dance Album of Carl Perkins =

Studio album by Carl Perkins
- Released: 1958
- Recorded: October 1954 – December 1956
- Studios: Sun Studio (Memphis, Tennessee)
- Genre: Rockabilly
- Length: 30:50
- Label: Sun
- Producer: Sam Phillips

Carl Perkins chronology
Dance Album of Carl Perkins (1958)	Whole Lotta Shakin' (1958)

Professional ratings
Review scores
Source	Rating
AllMusic	5/5 stars

The Dance Album of Carl Perkins is the first studio album by American singer Carl Perkins, released in 1958. The album was released by Sun producer Sam Phillips after Perkins left the label for Columbia Records. Most songs were released previously as singles and B-sides. The remaining tracks are outtakes from the Sun sessions.

In 1961, the album was reissued as Teen Beat: The Best of Carl Perkins, with a new cover, but the same selection of songs.

== Influence ==
The album was a major influence on the Beatles. They released "Honey Don't" and "Everybody's Trying to Be My Baby" on the album Beatles for Sale and Beatles '65 in the U.S., and "Matchbox" on their EP Long Tall Sally. All songs from the album appeared at least in jam sessions by the Beatles, or were recorded after the breakup of the band by the ex-members. "Blue Suede Shoes" appeared on The Beatles Anthology 3 collection in 1996 in a studio jam from 1969.

Paul McCartney released "Movie Magg" on the Run Devil Run album in 1997. Ringo Starr released "Sure To Fall" on the Stop and Smell the Roses album in 1981. John Lennon released a live recording of "Blue Sude Shoes" on the Live Peace in Toronto album in 1969.

== Track listing ==
Side one
No.	Title	Writer(s)	Recording date	Length
1.	"Blue Suede Shoes"	Carl Perkins	December 1955	2:13
2.	"Movie Magg"	Carl Perkins	October 10, 1954	2:07
3.	"Sure To Fall"	Quinton Claunch, Carl Perkins, Bill Cantrell	December 1955	2:30
4.	"Gone, Gone, Gone"	Carl Perkins	July 11, 1955	2:34
5.	"Honey Don't"	Carl Perkins	ca. December 19, 1955	2:47
6.	"Only You"	Buck Ram	March 1956	3:16

Side two
No.	Title	Writer(s)	Recording date	Length
7.	"Tennessee"	Carl Perkins	December 1955	3:00
8.	"Wrong Yo Yo"	Piano Red	March 1956	2:34
9.	"Everybody's Trying to Be My Baby"	Rex Griffin, Carl Perkins	March 1956	2:11
10.	"Matchbox"	Carl Perkins	December 4, 1956	2:06
11.	"Your True Love"	Carl Perkins	December 4, 1956	2:46
12.	"Boppin' the Blues"	Carl Perkins, Howard Griffin	March 1956	2:46
