= Let the Jukebox Keep On Playing =

Single by Carl Perkins
- B-side: "Gone, Gone, Gone"
- Released: October 22, 1955
- Recorded: Unknown
- Genre: Country
- Label: Sun Records
- Songwriter: Carl Perkins
- Producer: Sam Phillips

Carl Perkins singles chronology
"Movie Magg"	"Let the Jukebox Keep On Playing"	"Blue Suede Shoes"

"Let the Jukebox Keep On Playing" is a 1955 country song written by Carl Perkins. It was released on October 22, 1955 by Sun Records as a 78 and 45 single, 224, b/w "Gone, Gone, Gone". The song was a follow-up to "Turn Around", released on Flip.

"Let the Jukebox Keep On Playing" was a slow country ballad featuring a fiddle and steel guitar. The song was geared towards the country and western market. The flip side, "Gone, Gone, Gone", was an uptempo rockabilly song that was tailored for the new emerging genre of rock and roll. Elvis Presley had paired fast, uptempo numbers backed with country and pop ballads on his Sun releases.

Mike Ness of the band Social Distortion recorded the song on his 1999 album Under the Influences. The Ballroom Rockets, David Tanner, Wanted Men, and Aaron Keim, Scott McCormick & Char Mayer have also performed the song.

== Personnel ==
The song was recorded at Sun Studio, 706 Union Avenue, Memphis, Tennessee. The producer was Sam Phillips.

- Carl Perkins: vocal/guitar
- James Buck Perkins: rhythm guitar
- Lloyd Clayton Perkins: bass
- W.S. "Fluke" Holland: drums
- Quinton Claunch: electric guitar
- Stan Kesler: steel guitar
- William E. Cantrell: fiddle

== Sources ==
- Perkins, Carl, and David McGee. Go, Cat, Go!: The Life and Times of Carl Perkins, The King of Rockabilly. Hyperion Press, 1996, pages 253-254. ISBN 0-7868-6073-1
- Morrison, Craig. Go Cat Go!: Rockabilly Music and Its Makers. University of Illinois Press, 1998.
