= Movie Magg =

1955 single by Carl Perkins

Single by Carl Perkins

from the album Dance Album of Carl Perkins
- B-side: "Turn Around"
- Released: March 19, 1955
- Genre: Rockabilly
- Length: 2:12
- Label: Flip Records (owned by Sam Phillips of Sun Records)
- Songwriter: Carl Perkins
- Producer: Sam Phillips

Carl Perkins singles chronology
"Movie Magg" (1955)	"Let The Jukebox Keep On Playing" (1955)

"Movie Magg" is a 1955 rockabilly song written by Carl Perkins and released on Flip Records, a subsidiary of Sun Records. Perkins had written the song at the age of thirteen. It was based on the true story of Perkins' girlfriend Maggie and their occasional trips to the movies at the weekends. Being the son of a poor sharecropper, Perkins did not have a car to drive Maggie to the picture show, so the pair rode on the back of his mule, Becky.

The song was released as a single on March 15, 1955 b/w "Turn Around" on the Sun Records subsidiary label Flip as a 78 and 45, 501. Flip releases were directed towards a country and western market. The song was recorded at Sun studios in Memphis, Tennessee but was not released on Sun because Sam Phillips did not want to have two Sun artists, Elvis Presley and Carl Perkins, targeting the same market. The next release by Perkins, "Gone, Gone, Gone"/"Let the Jukebox Keep On Playing", 224, would be on the Sun label. Once Elvis Presley left Sun, Phillips focused on Carl Perkins as the major rock and roll and pop artist on the label.

== Other recordings ==
Paul McCartney recorded a version of the song on his 1999 album Run Devil Run. "Movie Magg" was originally published by Hi-Lo Music, Inc., BMI. Charlie Thompson, Hank C. Burnette, The Rimshots, Yu (desaf1nad0), The Versatiles in 2001, Nicky Peck & the Folsom Prison Trio in 2002, Skinny McGee & His Mayhem Makers, Ghost Highway, Stephen Hardy, and Jesse Garon & the Greyhounds have also performed the song.

== Sources ==
- Morrison, Craig. Go Cat Go!: Rockabilly Music and Its Makers. University of Illinois Press, 1998.
- Naylor, Jerry; Halliday, Steve (2007). The Rockabilly Legends: They Called It Rockabilly Long Before They Called It Rock and Roll. Milwaukee, Wisc.: Hal Leonard. ISBN 978-1-4234-2042-2. OCLC 71812792.
- Perkins, Carl, and David McGee. Go, Cat, Go!: The Life and Times of Carl Perkins, The King of Rockabilly. Hyperion Press, 1996, pages 253–254. ISBN 0-7868-6073-1
