= Instant Karma: All-Time Greatest Hits =

Greatest hits album by John Lennon
- Released: 1 February 2002
- Recorded: 1969–1980
- Genre: Rock
- Length: 123:42
- Label: Timeless/Traditions Alive Music
- Producer: Various

John Lennon chronology
Wonsaponatime (1998)	Instant Karma: All-Time Greatest Hits (2002)	Acoustic (2004)

Professional ratings
Review scores
Source	Rating
AllMusic	2.5/5 stars

Instant Karma: All-Time Greatest Hits, a three-disc compilation album of music recorded by John Lennon, is a budget release targeted for sale at warehouse-type stores such as Sam's Club and Costco. The album was released in 2002 by Timeless/Traditions Alive Music under license from Capitol/EMI Special Projects.

== Overview ==
Disc one, subtitled The Hits, contains 11 songs that were previously released on singles. Disc two, subtitled Sings Classic Rock 'n' Roll, contains 10 cover songs recorded during Lennon's Rock 'n' Roll sessions as well as "Blue Suede Shoes" and "Dizzy Miss Lizzy", which were recorded live in Toronto in 1969. Disc three, subtitled The Classics Live, contains 12 songs recorded live in New York City either in August 1972 with Elephant's Memory at Madison Square Garden or, in the case of "Well (Baby Please Don't Go)", with Frank Zappa and The Mothers of Invention at the Fillmore East in June 1971. All 35 songs on the album had been previously released.

== Track listing ==
All songs written and performed by John Lennon, except where noted.

Disc One: The Hits

1. "Instant Karma! (We All Shine On)" – 3:20
  - By John Ono Lennon with the Plastic Ono Band
2. "Happy Xmas (War Is Over)" (Yoko Ono & John Lennon) – 3:34
  - By John & Yoko/Plastic Ono Band with the Harlem Community Choir
3. "Jealous Guy" – 4:15
  - By John Lennon Plastic Ono Band with the Flux Fiddlers
4. "Mind Games" – 4:12
5. "Whatever Gets You thru the Night" – 3:19
  - By John Lennon with the Plastic Ono Nuclear Band
6. "#9 Dream" – 4:48
7. "Stand By Me" (Jerry Leiber, Mike Stoller & Ben E. King) – 3:26
8. "(Just Like) Starting Over" – 3:56
9. "Woman" – 3:26
10. "Watching the Wheels" – 3:32
11. "Nobody Told Me" – 3:32

Disc Two: Sings Classic Rock 'N' Roll

All songs recorded during the "Rock 'n' Roll" album sessions except tracks 4 and 5, recorded live by Plastic Ono Band in Toronto, 1969.

1. "Ain't That a Shame" (Fats Domino & Dave Bartholomew) – 2:31
2. "Angel Baby" (Rosie Hamlin) – 3:44
3. "Be-Bop-A-Lula" (Tex Davis, Gene Vincent) - 2:38
4. "Blue Suede Shoes" (Carl Perkins) – 2:29
5. "Dizzy, Miss Lizzy" (Larry Williams) - 3:09
6. Medley: "Rip It Up"/"Ready Teddy" (Robert Blackwell, John Marascalco) - 1:34
7. "Peggy Sue" (Buddy Holly) - 2:05
8. "You Can't Catch Me" (Chuck Berry) - 4:53
9. "Slippin' and Slidin'" (Eddie Bocage, Al Collins, "Little Richard" Penniman & James H. Smith) - 2:17
10. "Do You Want to Dance" (Bobby Freeman) - 2:54
11. "Sweet Little Sixteen" (Chuck Berry) - 3:01
12. "Just Because" (Lloyd Price) - 4:25

Disc Three: The Classics Live

All songs recorded live by John Lennon with Elephant's Memory at Madison Square Garden, August 1972 except track 1 recorded live by John & Yoko/Plastic Ono Band with Frank Zappa and the Mothers of Inventions at the Fillmore East, June 1971

1. "(Well) Baby Please Don't Go" (Walter Ward) – 4:30
2. "New York City" - 3:38
3. "It's So Hard" - 3:18
4. "Woman Is the Nigger of the World" (Lennon/Ono) - 5:30
5. "Well, Well, Well" - 3:51
6. "Instant Karma! (We All Shine On)" - 3:40
7. "Mother" - 5:00
8. "Come Together" (Lennon/McCartney) - 4:20
9. "Imagine" (Lennon/Ono) - 3:17
10. "Cold Turkey" - 5:29
11. "Hound Dog" (Jerry Leiber & Mike Stoller) - 3:09
12. "Give Peace a Chance" - 1:01
