= Limehouse Studios =

Former television studio in London

General information
- Status: Demolished
- Location: Canary Wharf, London, England, United Kingdom
- Coordinates: 51°30′13″N 0°01′06″W
- Opened: Summer 1983
- Closed: Early 1989

Limehouse Studios was an independently owned television studio complex which opened in 1983 and was built in No. 10 Warehouse (30 Shed) of the South Quay Import Dock at the northern end of the Isle of Dogs in London. The building was demolished just six years later, in 1989, to make way for the Olympia & York development of Canary Wharf which now occupies the site. The opening of the studios was commemorated with a programme called Celebration which featured host Gary Wilmot and artists including Bonnie Langford.

== History ==
Number 10 warehouse was built in 1952 for Fruit Lines Ltd, a subsidiary of Fred. Olsen Lines for the Mediterranean and Canary Island fruit trade. At their request, the building was given the name Canary Wharf after the Canary Islands. Fred Olsen moved operations to a new site at Millwall Docks in 1970.

The conversion of the warehouse into TV studios was one of the first successes of the London Docklands Development Corporation. The studios were created as concrete boxes suspended within the immensely strong shell of the warehouse. In addition to the purpose-built studios, many productions made use of the unconverted old warehouse space.

== Inception ==
At a cost of about £3.6m, and under the design of Sir Terry Farrell, the warehouse was transformed into The Limehouse Studios; a complex containing two studios of 3,000 square feet (279 m^{2}) and 6,000 square feet (557 m^{2}) with associated production offices and post-production facilities. The two studios were contained in suspended concrete boxes mounted on independent giant springs to reduce external vibration, and fitted out.

As one of the then few independent facilities in London, Limehouse was founded by a group of executives from the former ITV franchise holder Southern Television after the company had lost its ITV franchise in 1980 to Television South (TVS). The new studios quickly became the venue of choice for many of the independent production companies making programmes for the new Channel 4. This was also helped by the popular hospitality boat moored alongside in the dock. Among the many programmes made at the studios at that time were MasterChef (1990); Who Dares Wins (1983–88); Treasure Hunt (1982–89), including a celebrity episode in 1985 where the studio itself was the final "treasure" location; Janet Street-Porter's youth television series Network 7 (1987–88), broadcast live from the unconverted parts of the warehouse building; and Whose Line Is It Anyway? (1988). The studios were also the home for the first nine series of Spitting Image from 1984 to 1989, which was made by the then Birmingham based Central Independent Television company (now part of ITV Central) for ITV. In 1985, American rock and roll legend Carl Perkins recorded a TV special at the studios, with special guests including George Harrison, Ringo Starr and Eric Clapton.

== Relocation and closure ==
In 1988, the building was sold to Olympia and York for £25m. The site became part of the wider development of West India Docks and the developers decided to name the entire project Canary Wharf using the more exotic and American-sounding name. One Canada Square now stands on part of the site cleared by the demolition of the former studios.

Following the purchase, the owners relocated the equipment to the former Lee International Studios at Wembley, which itself had previously been used as television studios for Associated-Rediffusion and London Weekend Television. The studios were purchased for a reported £5.25 million from Lee International and now called the Fountain Studios (closed 2019), with a second smaller studio and post-production facility in the Trocadero in W1. The Limehouse name disappeared when the parent company Trilion collapsed three years later.
