= Born to Rock (album) =

Studio album by Carl Perkins
- Released: 1989
- Studio: Creative (Berry Hill, Tennessee)
- Label: Universal
- Producer: Brent Maher, Don Potter

Carl Perkins chronology
| Disciple in Blue Suede Shoes (1984) | Born to Rock (1989) | Friends, Family & Legends (1992) |

Born to Rock is an album by the American musician Carl Perkins, released in 1989. It was considered to be an attempt to replicate Roy Orbison's late-career success.

== Production ==
The album was produced by Brent Maher and Don Potter. Some of its songs were cowritten by Perkins's sons, Greg and Stan. The title track is an autobiographical song. The Jordanaires contributed to the album.

Born to Rock included a few prototypical country songs. Perkins later expressed displeasure with the album, commenting that he wished it had a stronger rockabilly sound.

== Critical reception ==
Professional ratings
Review scores
| Source | Rating |
|---|---|
| AllMusic | 3/5 stars |
| The Encyclopedia of Popular Music | 3/5 stars |
| MusicHound Rock: The Essential Album Guide | 2.5/5 stars |
| Rolling Stone | 3/5 stars |
| The Rolling Stone Album Guide | 3/5 stars |
| San Jose Mercury News | 3/4 stars |

Rolling Stone wrote that, "unlike many early rockers who coast through contractual-obligation records with glazed indifference, Perkins sounds feverishly interested in the ten tracks here." The Los Angeles Times thought that the album "covers the old rockabilly style with jumping, humorous numbers delivered in a cottony, amiable voice that is an obvious influence for such younger performers as John Hiatt."

The Times called it a "splendid, vibrant collection from a veteran who remains a gifted songwriter, an alert guitarist and a distinctive singer with range, humour and an authentic rockabilly twang." The Capital Times determined that "Perkins, the purest rockabilly of them all, has returned to vinyl with an album that captures the essence of his seminal Sun recordings with the vision of a 50-year-old."

== Track listing ==
| No. | Title | Writer(s) | Length |
|---|---|---|---|
| 1. | "Born to Rock" | Carl Perkins, Greg Perkins, Stan Perkins | 3:40 |
| 2. | "Charlene" | Carl Perkins, Greg Perkins | 4:08 |
| 3. | "The Rain Might Wash Your Love Away" | Brent Maher, Don Potter, Don Schlitz | 4:37 |
| 4. | "Hambone" | Carl Perkins, Wayne Walker | 3:30 |
| 5. | "A Lifetime Last Night" | Carl Perkins, Greg Perkins | 3:49 |
| 6. | "Cotton Top" | Carl Perkins | 3:05 |
| 7. | "Baby, Please Answer Your Phone" | Larry Patton, Paul Overstreet | 3:18 |
| 8. | "Till I Couldn't Stand No More" | Pamela Patton | 4:10 |
| 9. | "Don't Let Go" | Jesse Stone | 3:23 |
| 10. | "Love Makes Dreams Come True" | Carl Perkins, Greg Perkins | 4:17 |

== Personnel ==
- Carl Perkins – lead guitar (electric and acoustic), vocals
- Don Potter, Larry Byrom – acoustic rhythm guitar
- Craig Nelson, Robert Burns – double string bass
- Bobby Ogdin – piano
- Eddie Bayers – drums
- The Jordanaires – backing vocals
