= Your True Love =

Song written by Carl Perkins in 1957

1957 Sun 78, 261.

"Your True Love" is a 1957 song written by Carl Perkins and released as a single on Sun Records. The single was released as a 45 and 78 backed with "Matchbox" in February, 1957. The recording, Sun 261, reached no. 13 on the Billboard country and western chart and no. 67 on the Billboard pop singles chart that year. The song was recorded on Tuesday, December 4, 1956 when Elvis Presley made a surprise visit to Sun Studios at 706 Union in Memphis, Tennessee. Johnny Cash and Jerry Lee Lewis also participated in the impromptu jam session that day known as the Million Dollar Quartet. Jerry Lee Lewis also played piano on the recording.

== Notable recordings ==
"Your True Love" was recorded by Ricky Nelson on his first Imperial Records album Ricky in 1957. Nelson also performed the song on national television on the Ozzie and Harriet TV series on ABC in 1957 in a performance that featured Joe Maphis on guitar. Terry Wayne released the song as a single in the UK in September 1957 on Columbia as DB 4002. Caesar and the Romans released the song as a 45 A side single in 1960 on Hi Note as 602-A. Bob & Shirley and the Valiants released "Your True Love" as a 45 single on the Band Box label as 225 in 1960. Chris Isaak recorded the song on his 2011 album Beyond the Sun as a bonus track. Jumpin' Gene Simmons released the song as a single in 1961 on Hi Records, SP HI 45-2034. The Brian Setzer Orchestra has also recorded the song in 1994 on the album The Brian Setzer Orchestra. The Beatniks recorded the song in 1989. The Refreshments recorded the song in 2008. George Harrison has performed the song as well, and when his band, The Beatles performed and recorded the song on January 3, 1969 at the Get Back/Let It Be sessions in Twickenham film studios in London. Paul McCartney does the lead vocals.

Carl Perkins performed the song on the Ranch Party syndicated TV show in 1957. Perkins also performed the song on the 1985 HBO/Cinemax concert special Blue Suede Shoes: A Rockabilly Session with George Harrison, Dave Edmunds, and members of the Stray Cats. The song appeared on the 1986 Rhino Records compilation Carl Perkins: Original Sun Greatest Hits.

In 1998, George Harrison paid tribute to Perkins by performing an impromptu version of the song at Perkins' funeral.

== Personnel ==
- Carl Perkins — vocals and lead electric guitar
- Jerry Lee Lewis — piano
- Jay Perkins — acoustic rhythm guitar
- Clayton Perkins — bass
- W.S. "Fluke" Holland — drums

== Sources ==
- Perkins, Carl, and McGee, David. Go, Cat, Go!: The Life and Times of Carl Perkins, The King of Rockabilly. Hyperion Press, 1996. ISBN 0-7868-6073-1
- Morrison, Craig. Go Cat Go!: Rockabilly Music and Its Makers. University of Illinois Press, 1998.
- The Carl Perkins Sun Collection.
- Guterman, Jimmy. (1998.) "Carl Perkins." In The Encyclopedia of Country Music. Paul Kingsbury, Ed. New York: Oxford University Press. pp. 412–413.
- Naylor, Jerry; Halliday, Steve. The Rockabilly Legends: They Called It Rockabilly Long Before They Called It Rock and Roll. Milwaukee, Wisc.: Hal Leonard. ISBN 9781423420422. OCLC 71812792.
