= That's Right (Carl Perkins song) =

Song by Carl Perkins
- B-side: "Forever Yours"
- Released: August 1957
- Genre: Rockabilly
- Length: 2:47
- Label: Sun
- Songwriters: Carl Perkins; Johnny Cash

"That's Right" is a 1957 rock and roll song written by Carl Perkins and Johnny Cash. The song was released as a single on Sun Records by Carl Perkins in August, 1957.

"That's Right" was released as Sun 274, Matrix #U-259, backed with "Forever Yours", Matrix #U-258. The song was recorded at Sun Records studios at 706 Union Avenue in Memphis, Tennessee. "That's Right" was published by Hi-Lo Music while "Forever Yours" was published by Knox Music. The personnel on the session were Carl Perkins, vocals and guitar, Jay Perkins, guitar, Clayton Perkins, bass, and W.S. "Fluke" Holland on drums. Both sides failed to chart.

== Sources ==
- Perkins, Carl, and McGee, David. Go, Cat, Go!: The Life and Times of Carl Perkins, The King of Rockabilly. Hyperion Press, 1996. ISBN 0-7868-6073-1
- Morrison, Craig. Go Cat Go!: Rockabilly Music and Its Makers. University of Illinois Press, 1998.
- The Carl Perkins Sun Collection.
- Guterman, Jimmy. (1998.) "Carl Perkins." In The Encyclopedia of Country Music. Paul Kingsbury, Ed. New York: Oxford University Press. pp. 412–413.
- Naylor, Jerry; Halliday, Steve. The Rockabilly Legends: They Called It Rockabilly Long Before They Called It Rock and Roll. Milwaukee, Wisc.: Hal Leonard. ISBN 978-1-4234-2042-2. OCLC 71812792.
