= Carl Perkins =

American guitarist (1932–1998)

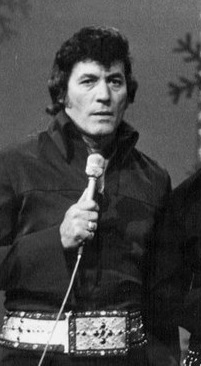
- Perkins in 1977

Background information
- Born: Carl Lee Perkins; April 9, 1932; Tiptonville, Tennessee, U.S.
- Died: January 19, 1998 (aged 65) Jackson, Tennessee, U.S.
- Genres: Rockabilly; rock and roll; country
- Occupations: Guitarist; singer; songwriter
- Instruments: Vocals; guitar
- Years active: 1946–1997
- Labels: Sun; London; Columbia; Mercury

Carl Lee Perkins (April 9, 1932 – January 19, 1998) was an American country and rockabilly guitarist, singer and songwriter. A rockabilly great and pioneer of rock and roll, he began his recording career at the Sun Studio in Memphis in 1954. Among his best known songs are "Blue Suede Shoes", "Honey Don't", "Matchbox" and "Everybody's Trying to Be My Baby".

According to fellow musician Charlie Daniels, "Carl Perkins' songs personified the rockabilly era, and Carl Perkins' sound personifies the rockabilly sound more so than anybody involved in it, because he never changed". Perkins's songs were recorded by artists (and friends) as influential as Elvis Presley, the Beatles, Jimi Hendrix, Johnny Cash, Ricky Nelson, and Eric Clapton, which further cemented his prominent place in the history of popular music.

Nicknamed the "King of Rockabilly", Perkins was inducted into the Rock and Roll Hall of Fame, the Rockabilly Hall of Fame, the Memphis Music Hall of Fame, and the Nashville Songwriters Hall of Fame. His recording of "Blue Suede Shoes" was inducted into the Grammy Hall of Fame.

== Biography ==
=== Early life ===
Carl Lee Perkins was born on April 9, 1932, in Tiptonville, Tennessee, the son of poor sharecroppers Louise and Buck Perkins (misspelled on his birth certificate as "Perkings"). He had two brothers, Jay and Clayton. From the age of six, he worked long hours in the cotton fields with his family whether school was in session or not. The boys grew up hearing Southern gospel music sung by white friends in church and by black field workers and sharecroppers in the cotton fields. On Saturday nights Perkins would listen to the Grand Ole Opry, broadcast from Nashville on his father's radio.

Roy Acuff's broadcasts from the Opry inspired Perkins to ask his parents for a guitar. Since they could not afford to buy one, his father made one from a cigar box and a broomstick. Eventually, a neighbor sold his father a worn-out Gene Autry guitar. Perkins could not afford new strings, and when they broke, he had to retie them. The knots cut his fingers when he would slide to another note, so he began bending the notes, stumbling onto a type of blue note.

Perkins taught himself parts of Acuff's "Great Speckled Bird" and "The Wabash Cannonball" having heard them played on the Opry. He also has cited Bill Monroe's fast playing and vocals as an early influence. Perkins also learned from John Westbrook, an African-American field worker in his 60s who played blues and gospel music on an old acoustic guitar. Westbrook advised Perkins to "Get down close to it. You can feel it travel down the strangs, come through your head and down to your soul where you live. You can feel it. Let it vib-a-rate".

In January 1947, the Perkins family moved from Lake County, Tennessee, to Madison County, 70 miles from Memphis, the largest city in West Tennessee and a center of a great variety of music played by both black and white artists. At the age of 14, Perkins wrote a country song called "Let Me Take You to the Movie, Magg". Sam Phillips was later persuaded by the quality of that song to sign Perkins to his Sun Records label.

=== Beginnings as a performer ===
Perkins and his brother Jay had their first paying job (in tips) as entertainers during late 1946 at the Cotton Boll tavern on Highway 45, twelve miles south of Jackson, Tennessee, starting on Wednesday nights. Perkins was 14 years old. One of the songs they played was an up-tempo country shuffle version of Bill Monroe's "Blue Moon of Kentucky". Free drinks were one of the perks of playing in a tavern, and Perkins drank four beers that first night. Within a month, Carl and Jay began playing Friday and Saturday nights at the Sand Ditch tavern near Jackson's western border. Both places were the scene of occasional fights and both of the Perkins brothers gained a reputation as fighters.

During the next couple of years, as they became better known, the Perkins brothers began playing other taverns around Bemis and Jackson, including El Rancho, the Roadside Inn, and the Hilltop. Carl persuaded his brother Clayton to join them and play the upright bass, to complete the sound of the band.

Perkins began performing regularly on WTJS in Jackson during the late 1940s as a sometime member of the Tennessee Ramblers with Carl on lead guitar, Junior Vastal on slap bass, and Edd Cisco playing rhythm guitar and singing. He appeared on the radio program Hayloft Frolic on which he performed two songs. One was "Talking Blues" as done by Robert Lunn on the Grand Ole Opry. Perkins and his brothers began appearing on The Early Morning Farm and Home Hour. Positive listener response earned them a 15-minute segment sponsored by Mother's Best Flour. By the end of the 1940s, the Perkins Brothers were the best known band in the Jackson area. Perkins had day jobs during most of these early years including picking cotton, working at various factories and plants and as a pan greaser for the Colonial Baking Company. His brothers had similar pick up jobs.

In January 1953, Perkins married Valda Crider, whom he had known for a number of years. When his job at the bakery was reduced to part-time, Valda, who had her own job, encouraged Perkins to begin working the taverns full-time. He began playing six nights a week. Later the same year, he added W.S. "Fluke" Holland to the band as a drummer. Holland had no previous experience as a musician but had a good sense of rhythm.

Malcolm Yelvington, who remembered the Perkins Brothers when they played in Covington, Tennessee, in 1953, noted that Perkins had an unusual blues-like style all his own. By 1955, Perkins had made tapes of his material on a borrowed tape recorder and sent them to record companies such as Columbia and RCA. But he used addresses such as Columbia Records, New York City, and seemed dismayed at the lack of response. "I had sent tapes to RCA and Columbia and had never heard a thing from 'em".

In July 1954, Perkins and his wife heard a new release of "Blue Moon of Kentucky" by Elvis Presley, Scotty Moore and Bill Black on the radio. As the song faded out, Perkins said, "There's a man in Memphis who understands what we're doing. I need to go see him". According to another telling of the story, it was Valda who said that he should go to Memphis. Later, Presley told Perkins he had traveled to Jackson and had seen Perkins and his group playing at the El Rancho.

Years later, the rockabilly singer Gene Vincent told an interviewer that, rather than Presley's version of "Blue Moon of Kentucky" being a "new sound", "a lot of people were doing it before that, especially Carl Perkins".

=== Sun Records ===
Perkins successfully auditioned for Sam Phillips at Sun Records in early October 1954. "Movie Magg" and "Turn Around" were released on the Phillips-owned Flip label (151) on March 19, 1955. "Turn Around" became a regional success, and Perkins was booked to appear along with Elvis Presley at theaters in Marianna and West Memphis, Arkansas. Johnny Cash and the Tennessee Two were the next Sun musicians to be added to the shows. During the summer of 1955 they had junkets to Little Rock and Forrest City, Arkansas, and to Corinth and Tupelo, Mississippi. Again performing at El Rancho, the Perkins brothers were involved in an automobile accident in Woodside, Delaware. A friend who was driving was pinned by the steering wheel. Perkins dragged him from the burning car. Clayton was thrown from the car but was not seriously injured.

Sun released another Perkins song, "Gone Gone Gone", in October 1955, which also became a regional success. It was a "bounce blues in flavorsome combined country and R&B idioms". The A-side was the more traditional country song "Let the Jukebox Keep On Playing".

Commenting on Perkins's playing, Sam Phillips has been quoted as saying

I knew that Carl could rock and in fact he told me right from the start that he had been playing that music before Elvis came out on record ... I wanted to see whether this was someone who could revolutionize the country end of the business.

Also in the autumn of 1955, Perkins wrote "Blue Suede Shoes", inspired by seeing a dancer get angry with his date for scuffing up his shoes. Several weeks later, on December 19, 1955, Perkins and his band recorded the song during a session at Sun Studio in Memphis. Phillips suggested changes to the lyrics ("Go, cat, go"), and the band changed the end of the song to a "boogie vamp".

After Sun Records headliner Presley left for RCA in November 1955, Phillips told Perkins, "You're my rockabilly cat now". Sun released "Blue Suede Shoes" on January 1, 1956 and it became a massive chart success. In the United States, it reached number one on Billboard magazine's country music chart (the only number one success he would have) and number two on the Billboard Best Sellers popular music chart. On February 11, Presley performed it on CBS-TV's Stage Show. On March 17, Perkins became the first country artist to reach number three on the rhythm and blues chart. That night, he performed the song on ABC-TV's Ozark Jubilee and Presley reprised his performance on Stage Show.

In Britain, Perkins's song reached number 10 on the UK singles chart. It was the first record by a Sun artist to sell a million copies. The Beatles covered the B side, "Honey Don't", followed by Wanda Jackson and in the 1970s, T. Rex. John Lennon originally sang the song when the Beatles performed it. Later it was given to Ringo Starr, one of his few leads during his time with the band. Lennon also performed the song on The Lost Lennon Tapes.

=== Road crash ===
After playing a show in Norfolk, Virginia, on March 21, 1956, the Perkins Brothers Band headed to New York City for a March 24 appearance on NBC-TV's Perry Como Show. Shortly before sunrise on March 22, on Route 13 between Dover and Woodside, Delaware, their vehicle hit the back of a pickup truck and went into a ditch containing about 12 inches of water. Holland had to pull Perkins, unconscious, from the water. Perkins had sustained three fractured vertebrae in his neck, a severe concussion, a broken collar bone, and lacerations all over his body. Perkins remained unconscious for an entire day. The driver of the pickup truck, Thomas Phillips, a 40-year-old farmer, died when he was thrown into the steering wheel. Jay Perkins had a fractured neck and severe internal injuries. Later he developed a malignant brain tumor, and died in 1958.

On March 23, Presley's band members Bill Black, Scotty Moore and D.J. Fontana visited Perkins on their way to New York to appear with Presley. Fontana recalled Perkins saying, "You looked like a bunch of angels coming to see me". Black told him, "Hey man, Elvis sends his love", and lit a cigarette for him, even though the patient in the next bed was in an oxygen tent. Presley also telegraphed Perkins his well wishes.

"Blue Suede Shoes" had sold more than 500,000 copies by March 22, and Sam Philips had planned to celebrate by presenting Perkins with a gold record on The Perry Como Show. While Perkins recuperated from his injuries, "Blue Suede Shoes" reached number one on regional pop, R&B, and country charts. It also reached number two on the Billboard pop and country charts, below Elvis Presley's "Heartbreak Hotel". By mid-April, more than one million copies of "Blue Suede Shoes" had sold. On April 3, while still recuperating in Jackson, Perkins watched Presley perform "Blue Suede Shoes" in his first appearance on The Milton Berle Show. This was the third time he performed the song on national television.

=== Return to recording and touring ===
"Dixie Fried"
The rockabilly song "Dixie Fried" performed by Carl Perkins

Perkins returned to live performances on April 21, 1956 beginning with an appearance in Beaumont, Texas, with the Big D Jamboree tour. Before he resumed touring, Sam Phillips arranged a recording session at Sun with Edd Cisco filling in for the still-recuperating Jay. By mid-April, they recorded "Dixie Fried", "Put Your Cat Clothes On", "Wrong Yo-Yo", "You Can't Make Love to Somebody", "Everybody's Trying to Be My Baby", and "That Don't Move Me". On May 26, Perkins and his band (with Jay Perkins performing wearing a visible neck brace), finally appeared on The Perry Como Show to perform "Blue Suede Shoes".

Perkins (front) performing "Glad All Over" with (left to right) Clayton Perkins, W.S. "Fluke" Holland, and Jay Perkins in the 1957 movie Jamboree

Beginning early that summer, Perkins was paid $1,000 to play two songs a night on the extended tour of Top Stars of '56. Other performers on the tour were Chuck Berry and Frankie Lymon and the Teenagers. When Perkins and the group entered the stage in Columbia, South Carolina, he was shocked to see a teenager with a bleeding chin pressed against the stage by the massed crowd. During the first guitar intermission of "Honey Don't", they were waved offstage and into a vacant dressing room behind a double line of police officers. Appalled by what he had seen and felt, Perkins left the tour. Appearing with Gene Vincent and Lillian Briggs in a rock 'n' roll show, he helped attract 39,872 people to the Reading Fair in Pennsylvania on a Tuesday night in late September. Soon after, a full grandstand and one thousand people stood in a heavy rain to hear Perkins and Briggs at the Brockton Fair in Massachusetts.

Sun issued two more Perkins singles in 1956: "Boppin' the Blues" / "All Mama's Children" (Sun 243), the B side co-written with Johnny Cash; and "Dixie Fried" / "I'm Sorry, I'm Not Sorry" (Sun 249). "Boppin' the Blues" reached number 47 on the Cashbox pop singles chart, number nine on the Billboard country and western chart, and number 70 on the Billboard Hot 100.

On December 4, 1956, Perkins and his band recorded "Matchbox" (what Michael Hill has reported was adapted from Blind Lemon Jefferson's song "Matchbox Blues") and "Your True Love", with piano from Jerry Lee Lewis, who was then serving as Sun Studio's session pianist before he became a popular musician. Later that day, Perkins, Presley, Lewis, and Johnny Cash participated in an impromptu jam session that later became widely known as the Million Dollar Quartet session. Sun released the full recordings from this jam session, a selection of gospel, country, and R&B songs, in 1990.

"Matchbox" b/w "Your True Love" was released in February 1957, "Boppin' the Blues" reached number 47 on the Cashbox pop singles chart, number nine on the Billboard country and western chart, and number 70 on the Billboard Hot 100. with the A-side becoming a rockabilly classic. On February 2, 1957, Perkins again appeared on Ozark Jubilee, singing "Matchbox" and "Blue Suede Shoes". He also made at least two appearances on Town Hall Party in Compton, California, in 1957, singing both songs. Those performances were included in the Western Ranch Dance Party series filmed and distributed by Screen Gems.

He released "That's Right", co-written with Johnny Cash, backed with the ballad "Forever Yours", as Sun single 274 in August, 1957. Neither side made it onto the charts.

The 1957 film Jamboree included Perkins performing "Glad All Over". The song was written by Aaron Schroeder, Sid Tepper, and Roy C. Bennett, Sun released it in January, 1958.

=== Life after Sun ===
In 1958, Perkins moved to Columbia Records, for which he recorded "Pink Pedal Pushers", "Pointed Toe Shoes", and others; these songs were released as unsuccessful singles that failed to replicate the success of his biggest hit.

In 1959, he wrote the country & western song "The Ballad of Boot Hill" for Johnny Cash who recorded it on an EP for Columbia Records. That same year, Perkins was cast in a Filipino movie produced by People's Pictures, Hawaiian Boy, in which he sang "Blue Suede Shoes".

He performed often at the Golden Nugget Casino in Las Vegas in 1962 and 1963. During this time, he toured nine Midwestern states and made a tour in Germany. In 1962, Patsy Cline recorded "So Wrong", which Perkins wrote with Mel Tillis and Danny Dill, and had a No. 14 hit on the country chart.

In May 1964, Perkins toured Britain with Chuck Berry with the popular, young rock group, The Animals backing them. Perkins had been reluctant to undertake the tour, convinced that as forgotten as he had become in America, he would be even more obscure in the UK and did not want to be humiliated by drawing meager audiences. Berry assured him that they had remained much more popular in Britain since the 1950s than they had in the United States, and that there would be large crowds of fans at every show. On the last night of the tour, Perkins attended a party where he sat on the floor sharing stories, playing guitar, and singing songs while surrounded by the Beatles. Ringo Starr asked if he could record "Honey Don't". Perkins answered, "Man, go ahead, have at it". The Beatles later recorded covers of "Matchbox", "Honey Don't" and "Everybody's Trying to Be My Baby", enabling Perkins to buy a farm for his parents from the royalties. Starr sang the lead on the first two, George Harrison sang the lead on the third. In Beatles historian Mark Lewisohn's book "The Beatles Recording Sessions At Abbey Road," Lewisohn indicated that Perkins dropped by Abbey Road Studios on June 1, 1964, the afternoon The Beatles recorded "Matchbox" to watch, but not participate. The Beatles also recorded two versions of "Glad All Over" in 1963. Another tour to Germany followed in the autumn.

He released "Big Bad Blues" backed with "Lonely Heart" as a single on Brunswick Records with the Nashville Teens in June, 1964.

In 1966, Perkins signed with Dollie Records and released as his first single for them, "Country Boy's Dream", which reached No. 22 in the country chart. That same year Bob Luman had a Top 40 Country hit with Perkins's song, "Poor Boy Blues".

While on tour with the Johnny Cash show in 1968, Perkins went on a four day drinking binge that ended with him hallucinating floridly and passing out. When he regained consciousness, he went out to the beach with his last bottle of alcohol. In his autobiography, he described falling to his knees and declaring, "Lord, ... I'm gonna throw this bottle. I'm gonna show You that I believe in you" before hurling the bottle into the sea and vowing to remain sober. Perkins and Cash, who had his own substance-abuse issues, supported each other in their bids to remain sober.

In 1968, Cash recorded the Perkins-written "Daddy Sang Bass" which incorporates parts of the gospel standard "Will the Circle Be Unbroken". It rose to the top of the country music chart where it stayed for six weeks. It was a Country Music Association nominee for 'Song of the Year' the next year. Perkins also played lead guitar on Cash's single "A Boy Named Sue", recorded live at San Quentin prison. It went to number one for five weeks on the country chart and number two on the pop chart. (The performance was also filmed by Granada Television for broadcast).

Perkins spent a decade in Cash's touring revue, often as an opening act for Cash as at the Folsom and San Quentin prison concerts, where he was recorded singing "Blue Suede Shoes" and "Matchbox" before Cash took the stage. These performances were not released until the 2000s. He also appeared on the television series The Johnny Cash Show. On the television program Kraft Music Hall on April 16, 1969, which Cash hosted, Perkins performed his song "Restless".

Perkins and Bob Dylan wrote "Champaign, Illinois" in 1969. Dylan was in Nashville from February 12 to February 21, recording his album Nashville Skyline, a crossover into country. He met Perkins when he appeared on The Johnny Cash Show on June 7. Dylan had writer's block and was unable to complete the song until Perkins contributed the rhythm and some lyrics upon which Dylan said to him, "Your song. Take it. Finish it". Perkins registered the song as co-authored and recorded it on his 1969 album, On Top.

Also in 1969, Columbia's Murray Krugman placed Perkins with the New Rhythm and Blues Quartet, the NRBQ, a rockabilly group based in New York's Hudson Valley. With the group backing him, he recorded two of his staples, "Boppin' the Blues" and "Turn Around", plus songs they sang separately.

Tommy Cash (brother of Johnny Cash) had a Top Ten country gospel hit in 1970 with the song "Rise and Shine" which Perkins wrote. It reached number nine on the Billboard country chart and number eight on the Canadian country chart. Arlene Harden had a Top 40 country hit in 1971 with the Perkins composition "True Love Is Greater Than Friendship", from the film Little Fauss and Big Halsy (1971). That same year, Al Martino's cover of the song reached number 22 on the Billboard country chart and number 33 on the Billboard Adult Contemporary chart. Perkins appeared with Cash on the popular TV country series Hee Haw on February 16, 1974.

After a long legal struggle with Sam Phillips over royalties, Perkins gained ownership of his songs in the 1970s and, in 2003, his widow, who by then owned the catalog, entered into an administration contract with Paul McCartney's MPL Communications.

=== Later years ===
The rockabilly revival of the 1980s helped bring Perkins back into the limelight. In 1981, Perkins recorded the song "Get It" with Paul McCartney. According to one source, he fully co-wrote the song with McCartney. This recording was included on the chart-topping album Tug of War, released in 1982. During 1985, Perkins re-recorded "Blue Suede Shoes" with Lee Rocker and Slim Jim Phantom of the Stray Cats as part of the soundtrack for the film Porky's Revenge.

In 1985, he joined former Sun labelmates Cash, Jerry Lee Lewis, and Roy Orbison to record a collaborative album, Class of '55: Memphis Rock & Roll Homecoming. The album was partly recorded at Sun Studio, where all four (and Elvis Presley) had launched their careers. It was a tribute to their early years at Sun and, specifically, the Perkins, Presley, Cash, and Lewis' 1956 Million Dollar Quartet jam session.

In October 1985, Perkins performed on stage in London for a television special, Blue Suede Shoes: A Rockabilly Session, with George Harrison, Eric Clapton, Dave Edmunds, Lee Rocker, Rosanne Cash and Ringo Starr. The show was taped live at the Limehouse Studios. It was broadcast on Channel 4 on January 1, 1986. Perkins sang 16 songs plus two encores. He and his friends ended the session by singing "Blue Suede Shoes", 30 years after its writing, which brought Perkins to tears. The concert special was a highlight of his later career. The concert was released for DVD by Snapper Music in 2006.

Perkins was inducted into the Nashville Songwriters Hall of Fame in 1985. Wider recognition of his contributions to music came with his induction into the Rock and Roll Hall of Fame in 1987. The Hall chose "Blue Suede Shoes" as one of its 500 Songs That Shaped Rock and Roll. The song also received a Grammy Hall of Fame Award. Perkins was inducted into the Rockabilly Hall of Fame in recognition of his pioneering contributions to the genre.

Perkins's only notable film performance as an actor was in John Landis's 1985 film Into the Night. The cameo-laden film includes a scene in which characters played by Perkins and David Bowie die by each other's hand.

In 1989, Perkins co-wrote and played lead guitar on the Judds' number-one country hit, "Let Me Tell You About Love". That same year, he signed a record deal with Platinum Records for the album Friends, Family & Legends, featuring performances by Chet Atkins, Travis Tritt, Steve Wariner, Joan Jett, and Charlie Daniels, along with Paul Shaffer and Will Lee. The song "Wild Texas Wind" became the title track to a made-for-TV movie featuring Dolly Parton and Gary Busey. In 1996, Willie Nelson, who also appeared in that movie, joined Perkins in a duet version of the song. During the production of this album, Perkins was diagnosed with throat cancer.

In 1990, Perkins again returned to Sun Studio to record with Scotty Moore, Presley's first guitar player, for the album 706 ReUNION, released by Belle Meade Records which also featured D. J. Fontana, Marcus Van Storey, and the Jordanaires. Dolly Parton had a Top 20 Country hit in 1991 with "Silver and Gold", which Perkins wrote with his sons Stan and Greg. Parton and Perkins co-wrote the song "Family"; both "Silver and Gold" and "Family" were released on Parton's album Eagle When She Flies. Mark O'Connor recorded a version of the Perkins "Restless" in 1991; O'Connor's cover peaked at #25 on the US country singles chart and #19 on Canada's country singles chart.

In 1993, Perkins performed with the Kentucky Headhunters in the music video for a re-recording of his song "Dixie Fried" filmed in Glasgow, Kentucky. In 1994, he teamed up with Duane Eddy and the Mavericks to contribute "Matchbox" to the AIDS benefit album Red Hot + Country, produced by the Red Hot Organization.

His last album, Go Cat Go!, released by the independent Dinosaur Records label in 1996, showcased Perkins singing duets with Bono, Johnny Cash, John Fogerty, George Harrison, Paul McCartney, Willie Nelson, Tom Petty, Paul Simon, and Ringo Starr.

His last major concert performance was the Music for Montserrat all-star charity concert at London's Royal Albert Hall on September 15, 1997, four months before his death.

=== Posthumous releases ===
In 2025, Sun Records released a new Perkins album, Some Things Never Change, which had originally been recorded in 1990 but whose recordings were thought to be lost until being rediscovered in 2024. The album was produced by Bill Lloyd and featured Perkins backed by his sons Stan (drums) and Greg (bass), augmented by studio musicians Joe Schenk (piano), Jerry Douglas, and Pete Finney.

== Personal life ==
In January 1953, Perkins married Valda Crider, whom he had known for a number of years. When his job at the bakery was reduced to part-time, Valda, who had her own job, encouraged Perkins to begin working the taverns full-time. He began playing six nights a week.

In 1962, Perkins severely injured his right hand and fingers in an accident at the end of a show while bowing; he nearly died in the process. Perkins' doctor wanted to amputate his injured fingers but reportedly "reluctantly agreed to try" to save them as a result of Perkins' wife Valda's insistence. He eventually regained full use of his thumb and first two fingers but only regained partial use of his pinkie.

Around 1965, while touring with friend and former Sun labelmate Johnny Cash, Perkins became a born-again Christian and recovered from his addiction to alcohol, which had begun when Perkins' career declined in the late 1950s around the time Jay Perkins died from a brain tumor.

A strong advocate for child welfare, Perkins worked with the Jackson Exchange Club to establish the first center in Tennessee for the prevention of child abuse, the fourth in the nation. Proceeds from a concert which he planned were combined with a grant from the National Exchange Club to establish the Prevention of Child Abuse in October 1981. For years, its annual Circle of Hope Telethon generated one quarter of the center's annual operating budget.

Perkins had one daughter, Debbie, and three sons, Stan, Greg, and Steve. Stan, Perkins' firstborn son, is also a recording artist. In 2010, he joined forces with Jerry Naylor to record a duet tribute, "To Carl: Let It Vibrate". Stan has been inducted into the Rockabilly Hall of Fame. Greg played bass on stage alongside his father at the 1985 Blue Suede Shoes: A Rockabilly Session concert in London and co-wrote "Birth of Rock and Roll" with his father. In 1983, a jury in Jackson, Tennessee found Greg Perkins "innocent on two felony counts of vehicular homicide, and guilty on a misdemeanor charge of driving under the influence of alcohol". In 1997, Perkins' wife Valda was "recovering from a year long illness," and his son Greg collapsed as a result of liver damage that may have resulted in a liver transplant.

== Death ==
Perkins died on January 19, 1998, at the age of 65 at Jackson-Madison County Hospital in Jackson, Tennessee, from complications from several minor strokes the previous month. Among the mourners at his standing room only funeral at Lambuth University were George Harrison, Johnny Cash and June Carter Cash, Jerry Lee Lewis, Wynonna Judd, Sam Phillips, Ricky Skaggs, Brian Setzer, Garth Brooks, and Billy Ray Cyrus. During the service, Cyrus and Skaggs sang and the funeral ended with George Harrison singing an acoustic version of "Your True Love". Perkins was buried at Ridgecrest Cemetery in Jackson.

Perkins' widow, Valda deVere Perkins, died on November 15, 2005, in Jackson. Carl and Valda Perkins' son Greg (born January 15, 1959) died three days later at the age of 46 on November 18, 2005.

== Technique ==
As a guitarist, Perkins used finger picking, imitations of the pedal steel guitar, palm muting, arpeggios, open strings, single and double string bending, chromaticism, country licks, and tritone and other tonality clashing licks (short phrases that include notes from other keys and move in logical, often symmetric patterns). A rich vocabulary of chords including sixth and thirteenth chords, ninth and added ninth chords, and suspensions show up in his rhythm parts and solos. Free use of syncopations, chord anticipations (arriving at a chord change before the other players, often by an eighth-note) and crosspicking (repeating a three eighth-note pattern so that an accent falls variously on the upbeat or downbeat) were also among his favoured techniques.

== Legacy ==
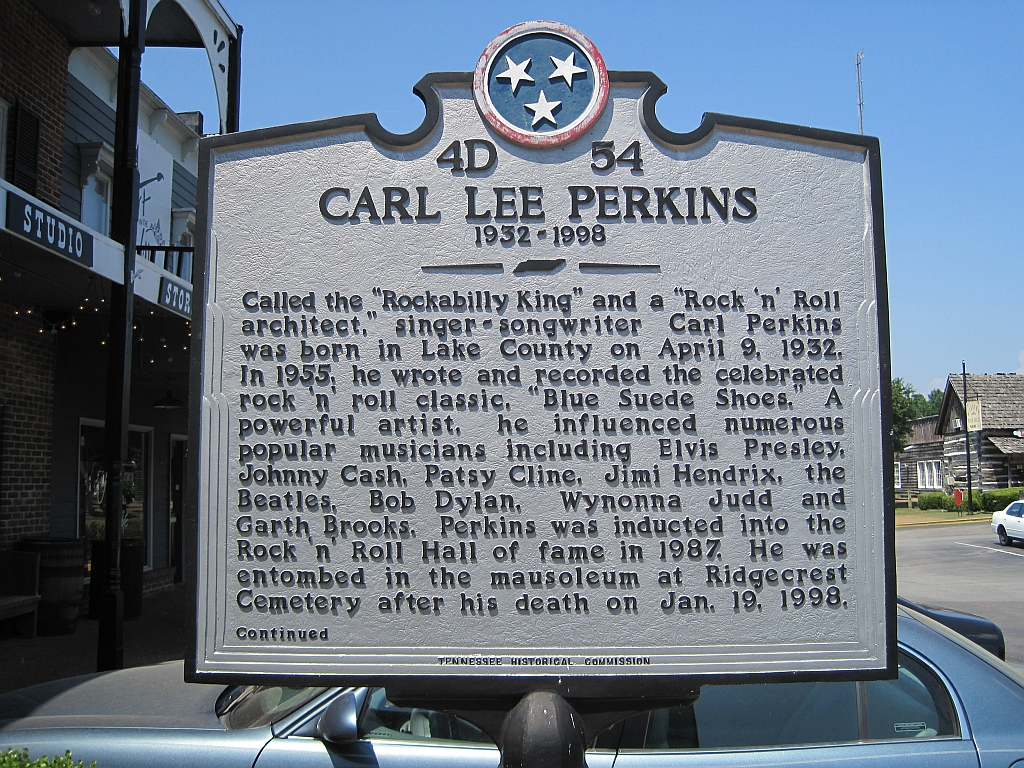
Historic marker commemorating Perkins alongside other famous peers

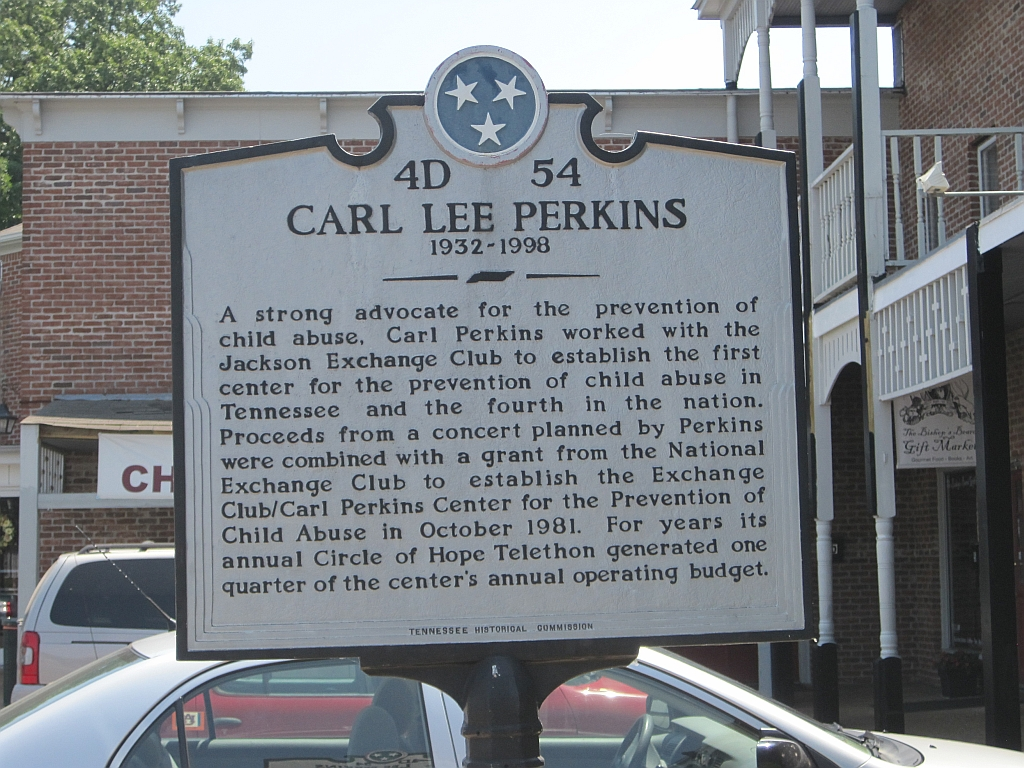
Continuation of the historic placard in tribute to Perkins

Perkins wrote his autobiography, Go, Cat, Go, published in 1996, in collaboration with music writer David McGee in 1996. Plans for a biographical film were announced by Santa Monica-based production company Fastlane Entertainment; it was slated for release in 2009.

In 2004, Rolling Stone ranked Perkins number 99 on its list of the 100 Greatest Artists of All Time.

The National Recording Preservation Board included his version of "Blue Suede Shoes" in its National Recording Registry of the Library of Congress in 2006.

The Perkins family still owns his songs.

Ricky Nelson covered Perkins's "Boppin' the Blues" and "Your True Love" on his 1957 debut album, Ricky.

The Beatles' live shows included rock 'n' roll covers of Carl Perkins's songs such as "Matchbox", "Everybody's Trying To Be My Baby", and "Honey Don't". Recordings of the latter two were included on their 1964 album Beatles for Sale.

Drive-By Truckers, on their album The Dirty South, recorded a song about him, "Carl Perkins' Cadillac". The Carl Perkins Arena in Jackson, Tennessee, is named in his honor.

George Thorogood and the Destroyers covered "Dixie Fried" on their 1985 album Maverick. The Kentucky Headhunters also covered the song, as did Keith de Groot on his 1968 album No Introduction Necessary with Jimmy Page on lead guitar and John Paul Jones on bass.

Johnny "Kid Memphis" Holiday portrayed Perkins in the 2005 Johnny Cash biopic Walk the Line.

Perkins was honored with the Lifetime Achievement award during the Tennessee Music Awards event in 2018 at the University of Memphis Lambuth in Jackson, Tennessee.

== Awards and recognition ==
The following recording by Carl Perkins was inducted into the Grammy Hall of Fame, which is a special Grammy award established in 1973 to honor recordings that are at least 25 years old and that have "qualitative or historical significance".

Carl Perkins: Grammy Hall of Fame Awards
Year released	Title	Genre	Label	Year Inducted	Notes
1956	"Blue Suede Shoes"	Rock and Roll (single)	Sun Records	1986	

== Discography ==
=== Studio albums ===
- Dance Album of... Carl Perkins (Sun, 1958)
- Whole Lotta Shakin' (Columbia, 1958)
- Country Boy's Dream (Dollie, 1967)
- On Top (Columbia, 1969)
- Boppin' the Blues (with NRBQ) (Columbia, 1970)
- My Kind of Country (Mercury, 1973)
- Mr. Country Rock (Demand, 1977)
- Ol' Blue Suede's Back (Jet, 1978)
- Rock 'N' Gospel (Koala, 1979)
- Country Soul (Koala, 1979)
- Cane Creek Glory Church (Koala, 1979)
- That Rockin' Guitar Man - Today (Stack-O-Hits, 1981)
- The Million Dollar Quartet (with Elvis Presley, Jerry Lee Lewis, Johnny Cash) (Charly/Sun, 1981; RCA, 1990)
- Presenting Carl Perkins (Accord, 1982)
- Born to Boogie (O'Hara Records, 1982)
- This Ole House (CPG Records, 1982)
- Gospel (Out Of Town Records, 1984)
- Carl Perkins (Dot, 1985)
- Class of '55: Memphis Rock & Roll Homecoming (with Roy Orbison, Jerry Lee Lewis, Johnny Cash) (Mercury, 1986)
- Born to Rock (Universal, 1989)
- 706 ReUnion: A Sentimental Journey (with Scotty Moore, D.J. Fontana) (Belle Meade, 1990)
- Friends, Family & Legends (with guest stars: Charlie Daniels, Chet Atkins, Joan Jett, Les Taylor, Steve Wariner, Travis Tritt, Paul Shaffer) (Platinum, 1992)
- Carl Perkins and Sons (with Greg Perkins, Stan Perkins) (RCA, 1993)
- Take Me Back (RCA, 1993)
- Disciple in Blue Suede Shoes (RCA, 1993)
- The Rockin' Guitar Man (Suede Record Company, 1994)
- Go Cat Go! (with guest stars: Paul McCartney, George Harrison, Ringo Starr, John Lennon & the Plastic Ono Band (with Eric Clapton), Jimi Hendrix (with the Band of Gypsys), Tom Petty & the Heartbreakers, Johnny Cash, Willie Nelson, Bono, Paul Simon, John Fogerty) (Dinosaur, 1996)
- Some Things Never Change (Sun Record Company, 2025)

=== Live albums ===
- The Carl Perkins Show (Suede Record Company, 1976)
- Live at Austin City Limits (Suede Record Company, 1981)
- The Survivors Live (with Jerry Lee Lewis, Johnny Cash) (Columbia, 1982)
- Blue Suede Shoes: A Rockabilly Session (Laserdisc: Pioneer Artists, 1986; VHS: MCA Home Video, 1986; DVD: Snapper Music, 2002; CD: Snapper Music, 2006)
- The Silver Eagle Cross Country: Carl Perkins Live (BMG, 1997; EMI-Capitol Music Special Markets, 2000)
- Live at Gilley's (Q Records/Atlantic, 1999)

=== Compilation albums ===
- King of Rock (CBS [UK], 1968)
- Original Golden Hits (Sun, 1969)
- Carl Perkins' Greatest Hits (Columbia, 1969) re-recordings, plus 1 new track "Restless".
- Boppin' the Blues (Accord, 1982)
- The Heart and Soul of Carl Perkins (Allegiance, 1983)
- Original Sun Greatest Hits (Rhino, 1986)
- Up Through the Years 1954–57 (Bear Family, 1986)
- Country Boy's Dream: The Dollie Masters (Bear Family, 1991)
- Back on Top (Bear Family, 2000; 4-CDs) compiles the 1968–1975 Columbia and Mercury recordings.
- Rock-A-Billy Fever (Thunder & Lightning [EU], 2008) compiles the Suede and Dot recordings, plus 4 previously unreleased live tracks.
- Boppin' & Rockin' (The Singles, As & Bs 1955–1959) (Jasmine, 2010)
- Playlist: The Very Best of Carl Perkins (Sun Sessions) (Sun/Legacy, 2013)
- The Complete Singles & Albums 1955–62 (Acrobat, 2015; 2-CDs)

=== Guest appearances ===
- The Blasters, Let's Rock Again (Live 1982) (2021) from the Chicago PBS 'Soundstage' TV program featuring special guests: Carl Perkins and Willie Dixon.
- The Judds, Greatest Hits, Volume II (RCA, 1991) Perkins is featured on "Let Me Tell You About Love".
- Philip Claypool, Perfect World (Curb, 1999) Perkins is featured on "Mile Out of Memphis".

=== Charted albums ===
Year	Album	Peak chart positions			Label
Year	Album	US	US Country	UK	Label
1969	Carl Perkins' Greatest Hits (re-recordings)	—	32	—	Columbia
1969	On Top	—	42	—	Columbia
1969	Original Golden Hits	—	43	—	Sun
1973	My Kind of Country	—	48	—	Mercury
1978	Ol' Blue Suede's Back	—	—	38	Jet
1982	The Survivors (with Jerry Lee Lewis, Johnny Cash)	—	21	—	Columbia
1986	Class of '55 (with Roy Orbison, Jerry Lee Lewis, Johnny Cash)	87	15	—	Mercury

=== Charted singles ===
Year	Single	Peak chart positions						Album
Year	Single	US Billboard Country	US Billboard	US Cashbox	US Cashbox Country	CAN Country	UK	Album
1956	"Blue Suede Shoes"	1	2	2	2 (Note: "Blue Suede Shoes" peaked at No. 2 for nine weeks.)	—	10	Dance Album of ... Carl Perkins
1956	"Boppin' the Blues"	7	70	47	12	—	—	Dance Album of ... Carl Perkins
1956	"Dixie Fried"	10	—	—	15 (Note: "Dixie Fried" peaked at No. 15 for three weeks.)	—	—	Original Golden Hits
1956	"I'm Sorry, I'm Not Sorry"	flip	—	—	—	—	—	Blue Suede Shoes
1957	"Your True Love"	13	67	—	15	—	—	Dance Album of ... Carl Perkins
1957	"Lend Me Your Comb"	—	—	60	—	—	—	
1958	"Pink Pedal Pushers"	17	91	—	17	—	—	King of Rock
1959	"Pointed Toe Shoes"	—	93	86	—	—	—	King of Rock
1966	"Country Boy's Dream"	22	—	—	28	—	—	Country Boy's Dream
1967	"Shine, Shine, Shine"	40	—	—	41	—	—	Country Boy's Dream
1969	"Restless"	20	—	—	30	—	—	Carl Perkins' Greatest Hits
1971	"Me Without You"	65	—	—	—	—	—	The Man Behind Johnny Cash
1971	"Cotton Top"	53	—	—	—	—	—	The Man Behind Johnny Cash
1972	"High on Love"	60	—	—	—	—	—	Single only
1973	"(Let's Get) Dixiefried" (1973 version)	61	—	—	—	—	—	My Kind of Country
1986	"Birth of Rock and Roll"	31	—	—	—	44	—	Class of '55
1987	"Class of '55"	83	—	—	—	—	—	Class of '55
1989	"Charlene"	—	—	—	—	74	—	Born to Rock

=== Billboard Year-end performances ===
Year	Song	Year-end Position
1956	"Blue Suede Shoes"	18
