= Honey Don't =

Rockabilly song by Carl Perkins

Single by Carl Perkins

from the album Dance Album of Carl Perkins
- A-side: "Blue Suede Shoes"
- Released: January 1, 1956
- Recorded: December 1955, Sun Studio, Memphis, Tennessee
- Genre: Rockabilly
- Length: 2:53
- Label: Sun
- Songwriter: Carl Perkins
- Producer: Sam Phillips

Carl Perkins singles chronology
"Let the Juke Box Keep On Playing" / "Gone, Gone, Gone" (1955)	"Honey Don't" (1956)

"Honey Don't" is a song written by Carl Perkins, originally released on January 1, 1956 as the B-side of the "Blue Suede Shoes" single, Sun 234. Both songs became rockabilly classics. Bill Dahl of Allmusic praised the song saying, "'Honey Don't' actually outclasses its more celebrated platter-mate in some ways." It has been covered by more than 20 other artists, including the Beatles, Ronnie Hawkins and Johnny Rivers. The song has appeared in films such as The Prince of Tides, Diner, Perfect Sisters and Honey Don't!

== Background ==
According to David McGee, author of Go, Cat, Go! The Life and Times of Carl Perkins, the King of Rockabilly, Carl Perkins first brought the song to a rehearsal with his band which at the time comprised the Perkins brothers and W. S. Holland:

- Carl Perkins – lead guitar and vocals
- Jay Perkins – acoustic guitar and backing vocals
- Clayton Perkins – double bass
- W. S. Holland – drums

When Carl first played the song to Jay Perkins, Jay protested what sounded to him like an odd chord choice, going to a C7 chord after the E instead of the natural blues progression choice of A. At first, Jay refused to go along, but Carl convinced him it was something different, and today the chord choice is one of the most interesting aspects of the song.

Perkins and his band performed the song, along with "Blue Suede Shoes", during their television debut on ABC-TV's Ozark Jubilee on March 17, 1956.

== The Beatles version ==
"Honey Don't"
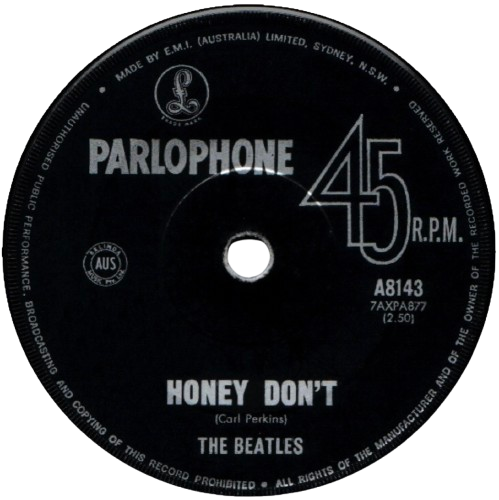
- Label from the 1965 Australian single, with "Rock and Roll Music" as the A-side

Song by the Beatles

from the album Beatles for Sale
- Released: 4 December 1964
- Recorded: 26 October 1964
- Studio: EMI, London
- Genre: Rockabilly
- Length: 2:55
- Label: Parlophone
- Songwriter: Carl Perkins
- Producer: George Martin

The Beatles recorded their version on 26 October 1964 as one of the last songs recorded for Beatles for Sale, which was released in the United Kingdom on 4 December 1964. The North American release was on 15 December on Beatles '65.

Although John Lennon had previously sung the song live, Ringo Starr performed it for the album, his usual one lead vocal per album. During the song, he makes self-referential remarks leading into George Harrison's guitar riffs, saying, "Rock on George, one time for me!" and then "Rock on, George, for Ringo one time!" The Monkees referenced the latter remark leading into the instrumental break of their song "No Time" from their 1967 album Headquarters.

The Beatles performed the song twice for the BBC for the From Us To You and Top Gear programs. A version sung by Lennon is available on Live at the BBC, and a version sung by Starr was released on On Air – Live at the BBC Volume 2.

As part of the 1985 televised concert Blue Suede Shoes: A Rockabilly Session, Ringo Starr joined Carl Perkins to perform vocals and play drums for the song.

Starr performed a live version of the song, as a tribute to Harrison for their fondness of Perkins, at the Concert for George at London's Royal Albert Hall in 2002.

The song was performed by Billy Strings with Ringo Starr backstage at the January 15, 2025, taping of the two-hour CBS TV concert special CBS Presents Ringo & His Friends at the Ryman in Nashville broadcast later in the year.

The song opens Ringo Starr & His All-Starr Band concerts for the 2025 summer tour, the 16th tour since 1989, replacing "Matchbox".

Along with "Matchbox", "Honey Don't" is one of the rare songs that all four Beatles have separately recorded or performed on stage (see section below).

=== Personnel ===
- Ringo Starr – lead vocal, drums, percussion
- John Lennon – acoustic rhythm guitar
- Paul McCartney – bass guitar
- George Harrison – lead guitar

Personnel per Ian MacDonald

== Other covers ==
- Johnzo West recorded the song for the 2014 Perfect Sisters movie soundtrack.
- Ronnie Hawkins on Mr. Dynamo album, 1960.
- Billy "Crash" Craddock covered the song on his 1986 album Crash Craddock.
- Ringo Starr & His All-Starr Band, 1989, Ringo Starr and His All-Starr Band 1990 live album, 1995, 2003, 2006, 2010-2011 tours, Blue Suede Shoes: A Rockabilly Session, 1985, and The Concert For George, 2003.
- Johnny Rivers covered the song on his album Memphis Sun Recordings, released in 1991.
- Gene Summers performed "Honey Don't", during a live concert, that was filmed and broadcast by Warner Amex Television in 1983.
- Ben Folds Five on the collection Vault Volume II (1998-2003).
- Raul Seixas covered the song on his 1975 album Novo Aeon.
- T. Rex featuring Marc Bolan recorded the song in 1971; Electric Warrior Sessions album, 1997.
- Wanda Jackson covered the song on her 1964 album Two Sides of Wanda Jackson.
- John Lennon recorded the song in the 1970s, released on the 2010 remasters collection, John Lennon Signature Box.
- Lee Rocker on the 2012 album Night Train to Memphis.
- Shakin' Stevens and The Sunsets, CBS single, I'm No J.D. album, 1971
- Glen Glenn and The Maddox Brothers live on the Squeakin' Deacon Show in 1957.
- Vince Taylor recorded the song in 1965.
- George Harrison performed the song live on stage in 1987 with the Silver Wilburys at the Palomino Club in Hollywood and with Carl Perkins in 1988.
- Paul McCartney has performed the song in soundchecks during the On the Run Tour in 2011 and the One on One Tour in 2016.
- Eugene Chadbourne, There'll Be No Tears Tonight album, 1980.
- Skitzo, Terminal Damage, 1988
- Johnny Devlin on the Prestige album How Would Ya Be.
- Mac Curtis in 1970 as a 45 single on Epic Records, 5-10574.
- Elvis Costello performed it with Ricky Skaggs, Brian Setzer, and Marty Stuart at a 1997-02-05 taping for Ricky Skaggs' TV show on TNN.
- Joe Walsh with Steve Earle for the motion picture The Beverly Hillbillies, 1993
- A version appears on the 2021 50th anniversary box set John Lennon/Plastic Ono Band.
- Margaret Qualley, Aubrey Plaza and Talia Ryder recorded a version for the soundtrack of Ethan Coen's 2025 neo-noir dark comedy film Honey Don't! Wanda Jackson's cover is included in the film, playing over the end credits.
