= Blue Suede Shoes =

Rock-and-roll standard first recorded by Carl Perkins in 1955

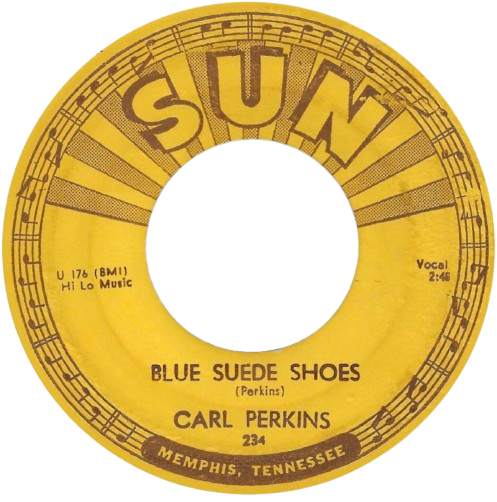
- A-side label of US single

Single by Carl Perkins

from the album Dance Album of Carl Perkins
- B-side: "Honey Don't"
- Released: January 1956
- Recorded: December 19, 1955
- Studio: Memphis Recording Service, Memphis, Tennessee
- Genre: Rockabilly; rock and roll; blues; country; pop
- Length: 2:14
- Label: Sun
- Songwriter: Carl Perkins
- Producer: Sam Phillips

Carl Perkins singles chronology
| "Gone, Gone, Gone" (1955) | "Blue Suede Shoes" (1956) | "Tennessee" (1956) |

Audio
- "Blue Suede Shoes" Video on YouTube

"Blue Suede Shoes" is a rock and roll standard written and first recorded by American singer, songwriter and guitarist Carl Perkins in 1955. It is considered one of the first rockabilly records, incorporating elements of blues, country and pop music of the time. Perkins' original version of the song appeared on the Cashbox Best Selling Singles list for 16 weeks and spent two weeks at the number two position.

Elvis Presley recorded "Blue Suede Shoes" in 1956 and it appears as the opening track of his eponymous debut album Elvis Presley. Presley performed his version of the song three different times on national television. It was also recorded by Buddy Holly and Eddie Cochran, among many others, including being performed by Paul McCartney, Blake Shelton, and Post Malone.

== Background ==
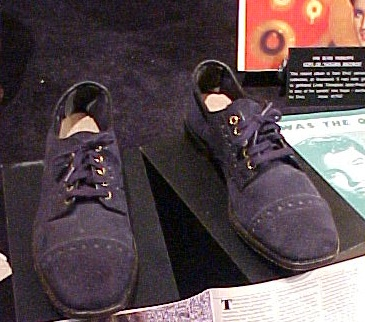
Shoes in Elvis exhibit similar to those that inspired the song

There are differing accounts about the origin of the song. In his second autobiography Cash: The Autobiography, Johnny Cash recalled planting the seed for the song in the fall of 1955, while Carl Perkins, Cash, Elvis Presley and other Louisiana Hayride acts toured throughout the South. Cash told Perkins of a black airman, C. V. White, whom he had met when serving in the military in Germany, who had referred to his military regulation airmen's shoes as "blue suede shoes", and insisted that no one step on or scuff them. Cash suggested that Perkins write a song about the shoes. Perkins replied, "I don't know anything about shoes. How can I write a song about shoes?"

In another version, Perkins played a dance on October 21, 1955, and noticed a couple dancing near the stage. Between songs, he heard the boy scold his partner, "Uh-uh, don't step on my suedes!" Looking down, he saw that the boy was wearing blue suede shoes and one had a scuff mark. Perkins was amused to see that the boy cared more about his shoes than the pretty girl he was with, and began working on a song about the incident that night.

In either case, Perkins decided to use a nursery rhyme for the basis of the song, settling on "One for the Money". Working with his Les Paul guitar, Perkins started with an A chord and improvised some lyrics: "Well, it's one for the money ... Two for the show ... Three to get ready ... Now go, man, go!" Satisfied, he scribbled the song onto some scrap paper, spelling the title as "Blue Swade" in his haste. According to Perkins, he wrote "Blue Suede Shoes" on December 17, 1955 and recorded it two days later for Sun Records. Sun's producer, Sam Phillips, convinced Perkins to change the lyric from "go, boy, go" in the first take of the song to "go, cat, go" in the second, which became the release version.

== Release and sales ==
1956 sheet music cover, Hill & Range, New York

Perkins' recording of "Blue Suede Shoes" was released in early 1956, as Sun 234. Two copies of the song on 78-rpm records were sent to Perkins but arrived broken. He soon discovered that the song was available in the newer 7-inch micro-grooved 45-rpm format and was disappointed that he didn't have a copy in the older, more substantial 78-rpm format.

In Cleveland, Ohio, disc jockey Bill Randle played "Blue Suede Shoes" often on his nightly show, and before the end of the month, Phillips shipped an additional 25,000 copies to Cleveland. In Memphis and Jackson, where Perkins lived, the song's B-side, "Honey Don't", was initially more popular on the radio, but was eventually overtaken by "Blue Suede Shoes". On February 11, "Blue Suede Shoes" was the number two single on Memphis charts; by the following week it was number one, a position it held for the next three months. A Song Hits review of the song, published on February 18, stated that "Perkins has come up with some wax here that has hit the national retail chart in almost record time. Interestingly enough, the disk has a measure of appeal for pop and r&b customers."

Perkins made four appearances on the radio program Big D Jamboree on station KRLD in Dallas, where he played the song every Saturday night. He was also booked for a number of one-night performances throughout the Southwest. The Jamboree was broadcast from the Dallas Sportatorium, with about 4,000 seats, which sold out for each of Perkins' performances. Music shops in Dallas ordered a huge number of copies of the record, and at one point it was being shipped out at a rate of 20,000 copies per day.

On March 17, Perkins became the first country artist to reach the number three spot on the rhythm and blues charts. That night, Perkins and his band first performed "Blue Suede Shoes" on television, on ABC-TV's Ozark Jubilee (coincidentally, Presley was on Stage Show on CBS-TV that same night, for which he also performed the song).

Perkins was booked to appear on The Perry Como Show on NBC-TV on March 24, but two days prior, he and his band were involved in a serious automobile crash on the way to New York City, resulting in the death of a truck driver and the hospitalization of both Perkins and his brother. While Perkins recuperated from his injuries, "Blue Suede Shoes" rose to number one on most pop, R&B and country regional charts. "I was a poor farm boy, and with 'Shoes' I felt I had a chance but suddenly there I was in the hospital", Perkins recalled bitterly. It also held the number two position on the Billboard Hot 100 and country charts. Presley's "Heartbreak Hotel" held the number one position on the pop and country charts, while "Blue Suede Shoes" did better than "Heartbreak Hotel" on the R&B charts.

Perkins never attained the stardom of Presley, who, according to Perkins, "had everything. He had the looks, the moves, the manager, and the talent. And he didn't look like Mr. Ed, like a lot of us did, Elvis was hitting them with sideburns, flashy clothes, and no ring on the finger. I had three kids." After Presley hit the chart with his version of "Blue Suede Shoes", Perkins became known more for his songwriting than for his performing.

By mid-April, more than one million copies of "Shoes" had been sold, earning Perkins a gold record. "Blue Suede Shoes" was the first million-selling country song to cross over to both the rhythm and blues and pop charts. He became the first Sun Records performer to reach this milestone.

Sam Phillips retained the rights to "Blue Suede Shoes", although it was represented by the New York house of Hill & Range as part of the agreement when Phillips sold Presley's contract. Perkins acquired the rights to the song, along with all of his other songs recorded for Sun Records, in 1977.

Paul McCartney and his company MPL Communications purchased the rights to "Blue Suede Shoes" and other Perkins' songs in 2003.

== Personnel ==
- Carl Perkins - lead vocals, electric lead guitar
- Jay Perkins - acoustic rhythm guitar
- Clayton Perkins - double bass
- W. S. Holland - drums

== Elvis Presley rendition ==
"Blue Suede Shoes"
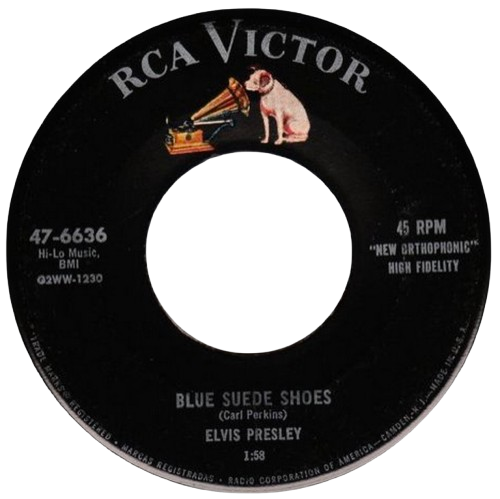
- A-side label of US single

Single by Elvis Presley

from the album Elvis Presley
- B-side: "Tutti Frutti"
- Released: August 31, 1956
- Recorded: January 30, 1956
- Studio: RCA Victor Studios
- Genre: Rock and roll; rockabilly
- Length: 1:58
- Label: RCA Victor
- Songwriter: Carl Perkins
- Producer: Steve Sholes

Elvis Presley singles chronology
| "Don't Be Cruel/Hound Dog" (1956) | "Blue Suede Shoes" (1956) | "I Got A Woman" (1956) |

During the 1940s and 1950s, it was common to record and release cover versions of hit songs, often in different styles or genres. RCA Victor wanted to promote Elvis Presley as a rock-and-roll artist, and believed a Presley cover of "Blue Suede Shoes" could outsell the Perkins/Sun Records version, especially with RCA's larger share of distribution and radio contacts. Presley, who had been signed at Sun Records and knew Perkins and Phillips, was reluctant to record a competing version. He eventually agreed to record the song if the company would delay its release as a single. Presley's version, recorded at RCA Victor Studios in New York City, features two guitar solos by lead guitarist Scotty Moore, with Bill Black on double bass and D.J. Fontana on drums.

According to Moore, when the song was recorded, "We just went in there and started playing, just winged it. Just followed however Elvis felt." According to reports confirmed by Sam Phillips, RCA Victor producer Steve Sholes agreed not to release Presley's version of the song as a single while Perkins' release was hot. Moore has said that Presley recorded the song to help out Perkins after his accident. "Elvis wasn't really thinking at that time that it was going to make money for Carl; he was doing it as more of a tribute type thing. Of course, Carl was glad he did. It really helped as his record started going down."

Presley performed the song on national television three times in 1956. The first was February 11 on Stage Show. He also performed it again on his third appearance on Stage Show on March 17, and again on the Milton Berle Show on April 3. On July 1, Steve Allen introduced Presley on The Steve Allen Show. Presley, dressed in formal evening wear, said, "I think that I have on something tonight that's not quite right for evening wear," and showed the audience his blue suede shoes.

"Blue Suede Shoes" was the opening track on the groundbreaking album Elvis Presley, which was released in March. RCA Victor released two other records with "Blue Suede Shoes" the same month: an extended play with four songs (RCA Victor EPA 747) and a double extended play with eight songs (RCA Victor EPB 1254). RCA Victor released the Presley version as a single on September 8, one of a number of singles RCA issued simultaneously, all culled from the album Elvis Presley. This single reached number 20, whereas Perkins' version had topped the chart. In 1999, Presley's version was certified as a gold record by the Recording Industry Association of America (RIAA), while in 2023, the British Phonographic Industry (BPI) certified the song silver for sales and streaming figures exceeding 200,000 units.

=== Personnel ===
The Blue Moon Boys

- Elvis Presley - lead vocals, acoustic rhythm guitar
- Scotty Moore - electric lead guitar
- Bill Black - double bass
- D. J. Fontana - drums

=== Certifications ===
| Region | Certification | Certified units/sales |
|---|---|---|
| New Zealand (RMNZ) | Gold | 15,000^{‡} |
| United Kingdom (BPI) sales since 2004 | Silver | 200,000^{‡} |
| United States (RIAA) | Gold | 500,000^{^} |
^{^} Shipments figures based on certification alone.^{‡} Sales+streaming figures based on certification alone.

== Legacy ==
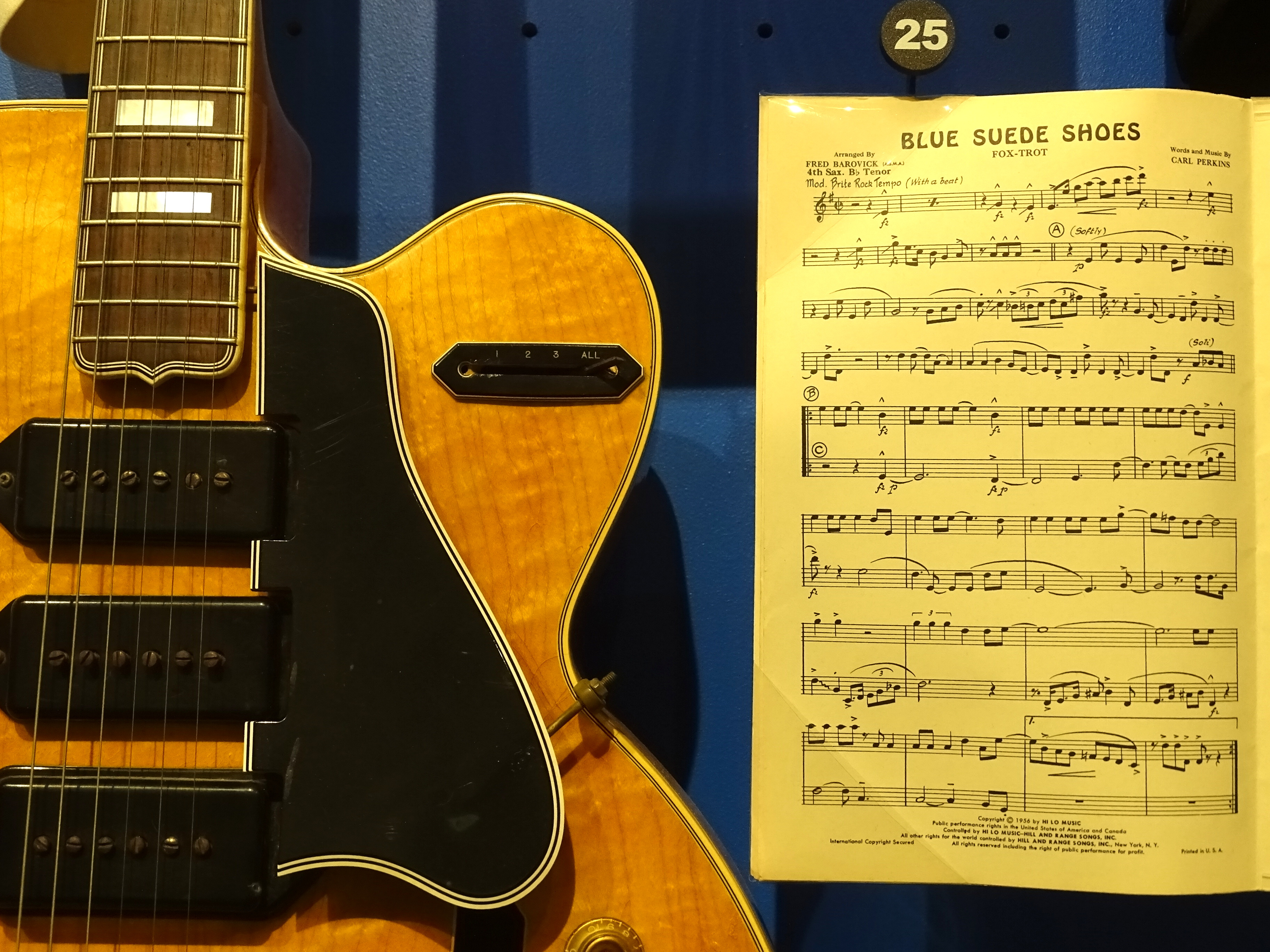
Carl Perkins' 1956 Gibson ES-5 Switchmaster next to sheet music of "Blue Suede Shoes", displayed at the Rock and Roll Hall of Fame Museum in Cleveland, Ohio

"Blue Suede Shoes" was chosen by the Rock and Roll Hall of Fame as one of the "500 Songs That Shaped Rock and Roll". In 1986, Perkins' version was inducted in the Grammy Hall of Fame and in 1999, National Public Radio included "Blue Suede Shoes" in the NPR 100, in which NPR's music editors sought to compile the 100 most important American musical works of the 20th century.

In 2004, Perkins's version was ranked number 95 on Rolling Stone's list of "The 500 Greatest Songs of All Time." Presley's recording of the song was also on the list, ranked number 423. The National Recording Preservation Board included the song in the National Recording Registry of the Library of Congress in 2006. The board annually selects songs that are "culturally, historically, or aesthetically significant."

As a rock-and-roll standard, "Blue Suede Shoes" has been performed and recorded by many artists. In 1969, a live performance by John Lennon and the Plastic Ono Band was included on Live Peace in Toronto 1969. An album review described it as one of the album's "blues-based oldies ... they lay it down in a dignified, noisy, glorified garage band manner".

One of the characters in the 1993 ClayFighter video game is called Blue Suede Goo, which is a parody of "Blue Suede Shoes". He is an Elvis impersonator with wildly exaggerated features, including a big gut and even bigger hair.

Marc Cohn's 1991 song "Walking In Memphis" from his album Marc Cohn references the song in the first line, "Put on my blue suede shoes and I boarded the plane". The song is also referenced in country music band Confederate Railroad's 1992 single, "Queen Of Memphis" from their album Confederate Railroad in the chorus, which says, I saw stars dancin' on the water, I heard Elvis singin' 'Blue Suede Shoes'".

The song is also referenced in George Jones' 1985 single, "Who's Gonna Fill Their Shoes" from his album Who's Gonna Fill Their Shoes in the second verse, "God bless the boys from Memphis, 'Blue Suede Shoes' and Elvis."
